= List of opera houses =

This is a list of notable opera houses listed by continent, then by country with the name of the opera house and city. The opera company is sometimes named for clarity.

== Africa ==
=== Egypt ===
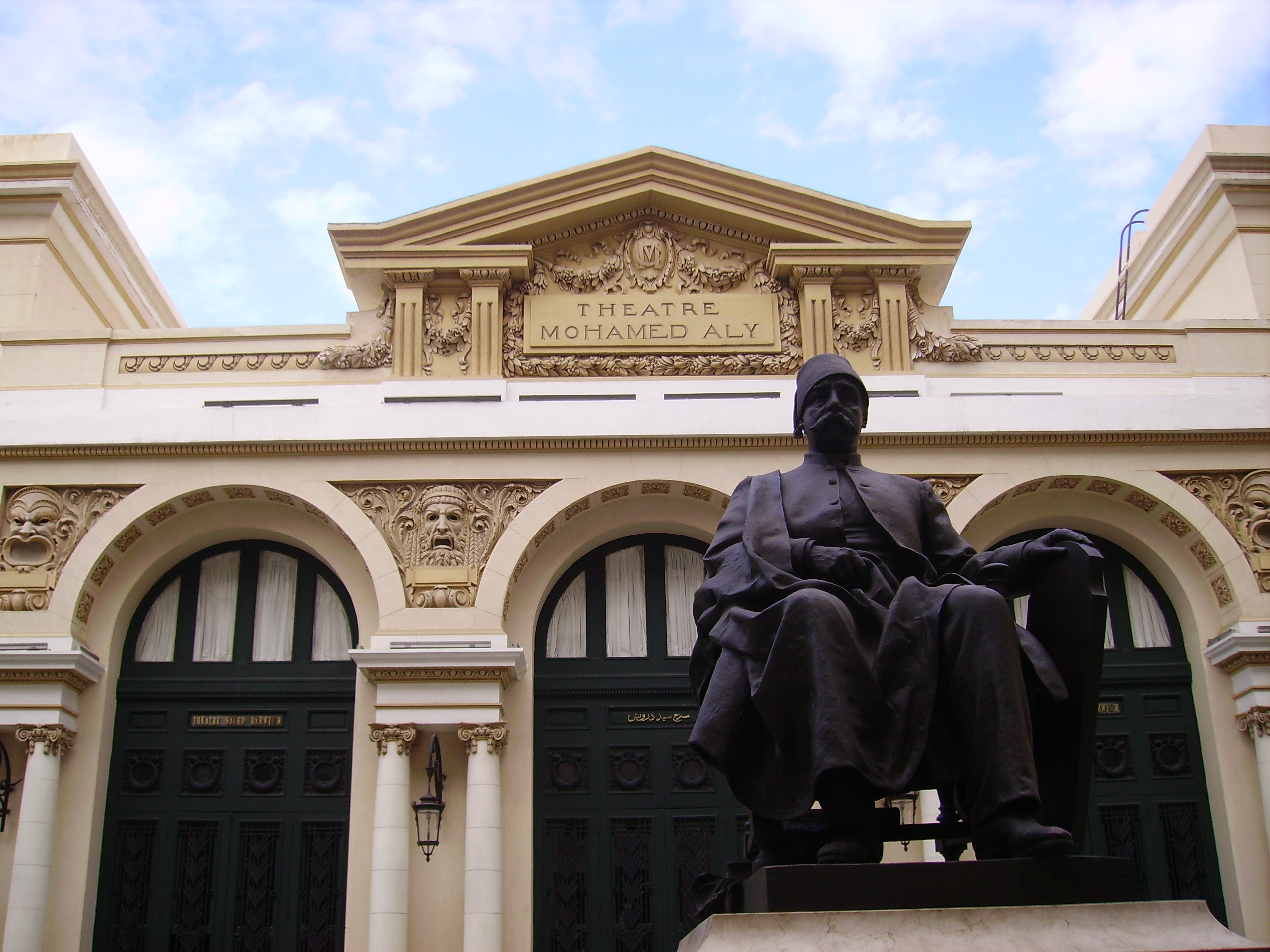
Sayed Darwish Theatre, Alexandria, Egypt.

- Alexandria Opera House, Alexandria
- Cairo Opera House, Cairo
- Damanhur Opera House, Damanhur
- Egyptian Royal Opera House, Cairo (burnt in 1971)
- Port Said Opera House, Port Said

=== Morocco ===
- Théâtre national Mohammed-V, Rabat
- Grand National Theatre of Rabat
- Grand Théâtre CasArts, Casablanca
- Gran Teatro Cervantes, Tangier
- Théâtre municipal de Casablanca
- Théâtre Afifi, El Jadida
- Royal Opera House of Marrakesh
- Théâtre Regent, Meknès

=== South Africa ===
- Artscape Opera House (Cape Town Opera Company), Cape Town
- Pretoria State Theatre

=== Tunisia ===
- Théâtre municipal de Tunis
- Tunisia's City of Culture

== Asia ==
=== Bangladesh ===
- Hatirjheel Opera House, Dhaka

=== China ===
- Century Theatre, Beijing
- National Centre for the Performing Arts
- Poly Theatre, Beijing
- Zhengyici-xi-lou, Beijing Opera, Beijing
- Poly Theatre (People's Liberation Army Opera House), Beijing
- Guangzhou Beilei Theatre
- Guangzhou Drama Arts Center – Theatre No.13
- Guangzhou Friendship Theatre
- Guangzhou Guanglian Hall
- Guangzhou Huanghuagang Theatre
- Guangzhou Jiangnan Theatre
- Guangzhou Military Auditorium
- Guangzhou Opera House
- Guangzhou Rainbow Theatre
- Guangzhou South Theatre
- Hangzhou Grand Theatre, Hangzhou
- Harbin Grand Theatre
- Shanghai Grand Theatre, Shanghai
- Shanghai Opera Theater, Shanghai
- Oriental Opera Hall at the Shanghai Oriental Art Center, Shanghai
- Shanghai Yue Opera House, Shanghai
- Tianchan Theatre, Shanghai

=== Hong Kong ===
- Ko Shan Theatre Theatre
- Ngau Chi Wan Civic Centre Theatre
- North District Town Hall Auditorium
- Sai Wab Ho Civic Centre Theatre
- Shatin Town Hall Auditorium
- Sheungwan Civic Centre Theatre
- Sunbeam Theatre
- Taipo Civic Centre Auditorium
- Tsuen Wan Town Hall Auditorium
- Tuen Mun Town Hall Auditorium

=== India ===
- Royal Opera House (Mumbai)
- Jamshed Bhabha Theatre (Mumbai)
- Opera House open theater (Bangalore)

=== Indonesia ===
- Aula Simfonia Jakarta, Jakarta
- Jakarta Art Building, Jakarta
- Taman Ismail Marzuki Theater Hall, Jakarta
- Usmar Ismail Concert Hall, Jakarta
- Marabunta building Opera house, Semarang

=== Iran ===
- Vahdat Hall

=== Israel ===
- Tel Aviv Performing Arts Center

=== Japan ===
- Aichi Arts Center, Nagoya
- Biwako Hall, Ōtsu, Shiga
- Bunkamura Orchard Hall, Tokyo
- Kanagawa Kenmin Hall, Yokohama
- New National Theatre, Tokyo (NNTT)
- NHK Hall, Tokyo
- Tokyo Bunka Kaikan, Tokyo
- Yokosuka Arts Theatre, Yokosuka

=== Kazakhstan ===
- ABAI Kazakh State Academic Opera and Ballet Theatre, Almaty (1934)
- Baiseitova Kazakh National Opera and Ballet Theatre, Astana (2000–2012, terminated)
- Palace of Peace and Reconciliation – Opera Hall, Astana (2006)
- Shymkent Regional Opera and Ballet Theatre, Shymkent (2007)
- State Opera and Ballet Theatre, "Astana opera", Astana (2012)

=== Kuwait ===
- Kuwait Opera House, Kuwait City

=== Malaysia ===
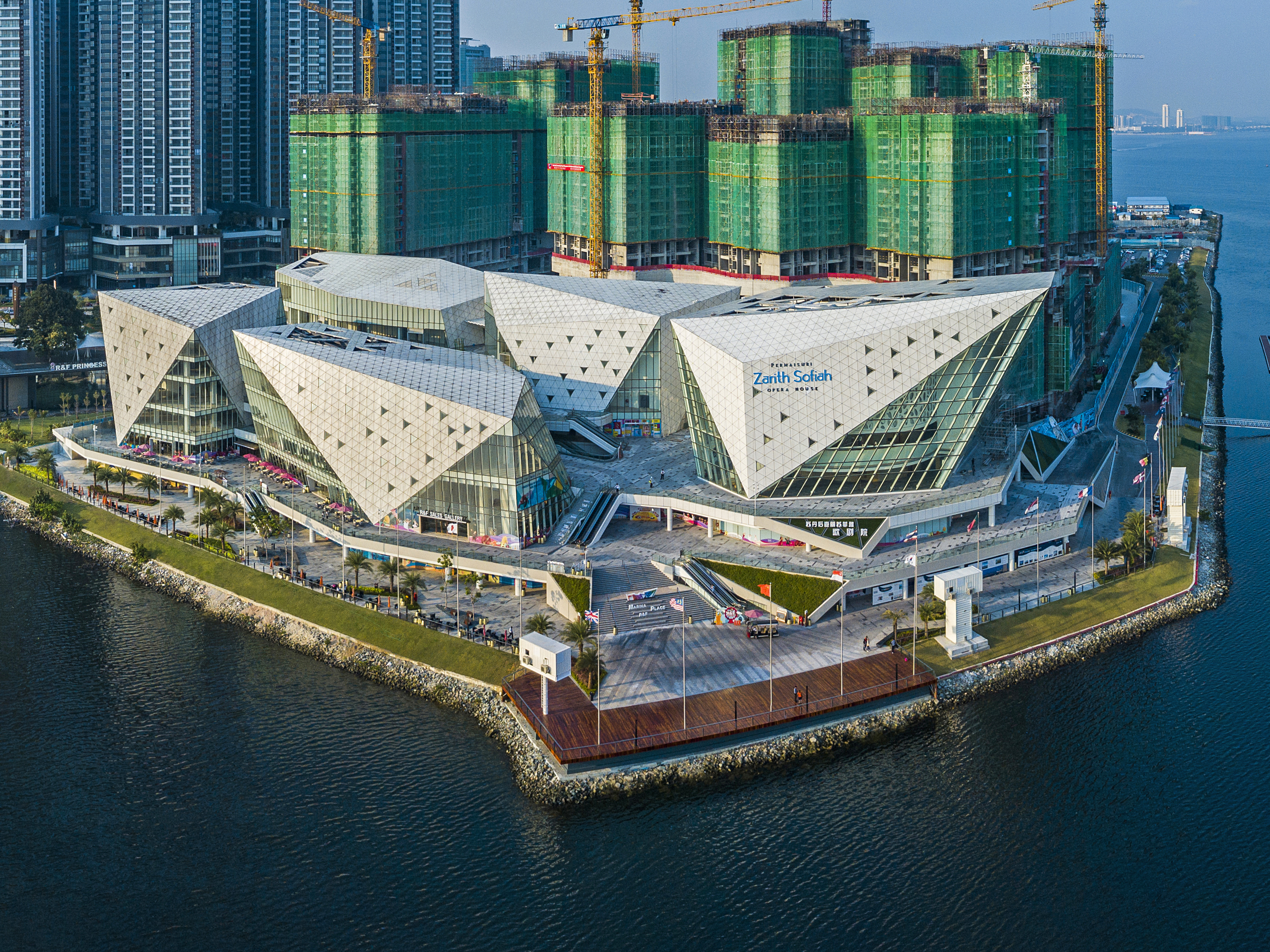
Permaisuri Zarith Sofiah Opera House in Johor Bahru, Malaysia

- Palace of Culture, Kuala Lumpur
- Permaisuri Zarith Sofiah Opera House, Johor Bahru

=== Mongolia ===
- National Academic Theatre of Opera and Ballet of Mongolia, Ulaanbaatar

=== Oman ===
- Royal Opera House, Muscat

=== Philippines ===
- Cultural Center of the Philippines, Manila
- Manila Grand Opera House – historic theatre, now demolished

=== Singapore ===
- Esplanade – Theatres on the Bay, Singapore
- Victoria Theatre & Concert Hall, Singapore

=== Syria ===
- Damascus Opera House

=== South Korea ===
- Daegu Opera House, Daegu
- National Theater of Korea, Seoul
- Seoul Arts Center Opera House, Seoul
- Seongnam Arts Center Opera House, Seongnam

=== Taiwan ===
- National Taichung Theater
- National Theater and Concert Hall, Taipei
- National Kaohsiung Center for the Arts

=== Tajikistan ===
- Aini Theater of Opera and Ballet, Dushanbe

=== Thailand ===
- Thailand Cultural Centre, Bangkok

=== Turkey ===
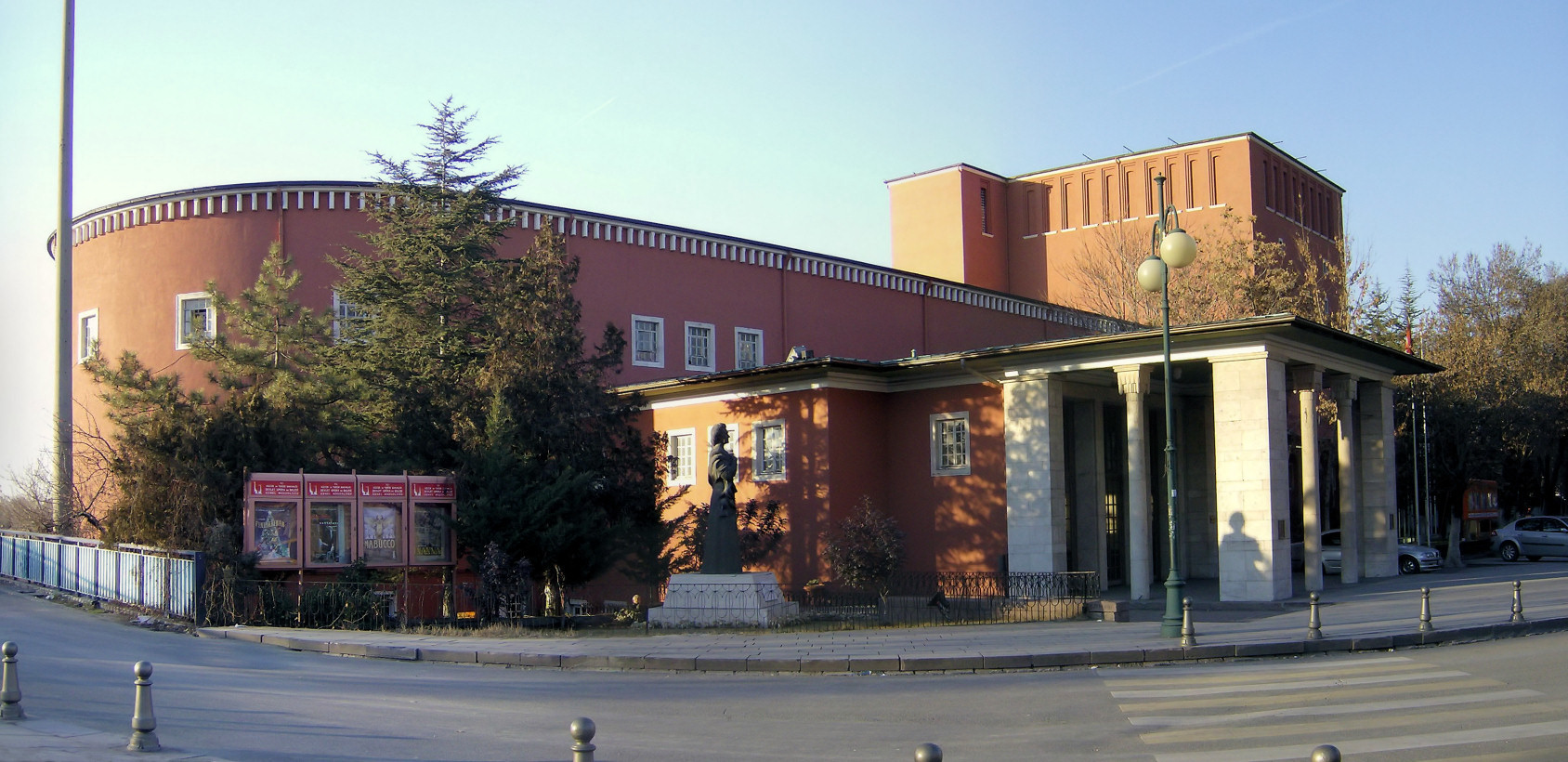
Main entrance to the Ankara Opera House

- Ankara Opera House, Ankara
- Atatürk Cultural Center, Taksim, Istanbul
- Antalya State Opera and Ballet, Antalya
- City Opera, Eskişehir
- İzmir State Opera and Ballet, Elhamra Palace, İzmir
- İzmir Opera House, İzmir (under construction)
- Leyla Gencer Sahnesi, Ankara
- Mersin Halkevi (Mersin State Opera and Ballet), Mersin
- Operet Sahnesi, Ankara
- Süreyya Opera House, Kadıköy, Istanbul
- Samsun State Opera and Ballet, İlkadım, Samsun

=== United Arab Emirates ===
- Dubai Opera, Dubai

=== Uzbekistan ===
- Navoi Theatre, Tashkent

=== Vietnam ===
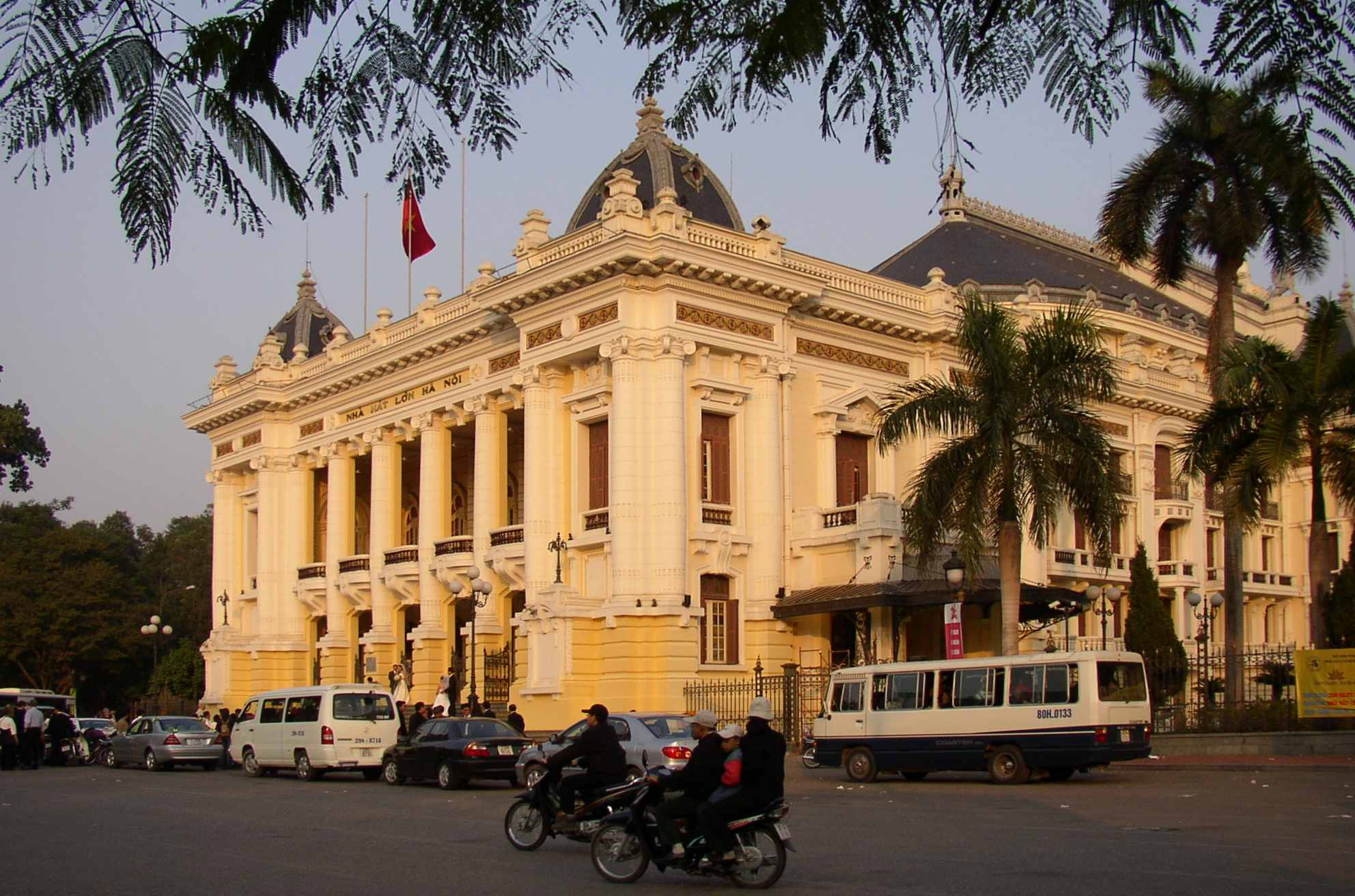
Hanoi Opera House

- Haiphong Opera House, Haiphong
- Hanoi Opera House, Hanoi
- Municipal Theatre, Ho Chi Minh City (Saigon Opera House), Ho Chi Minh City

== Europe ==
=== Albania ===
- Tirana Opera House, Tirana

=== Armenia ===
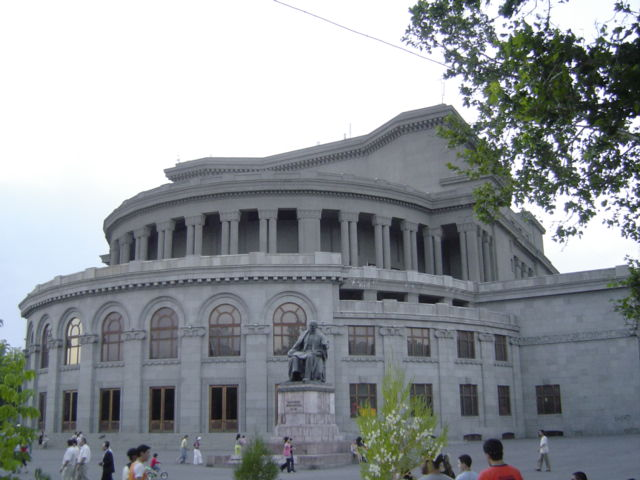
Yerevan Opera Theatre

- Yerevan Opera Theatre, Yerevan

=== Austria ===
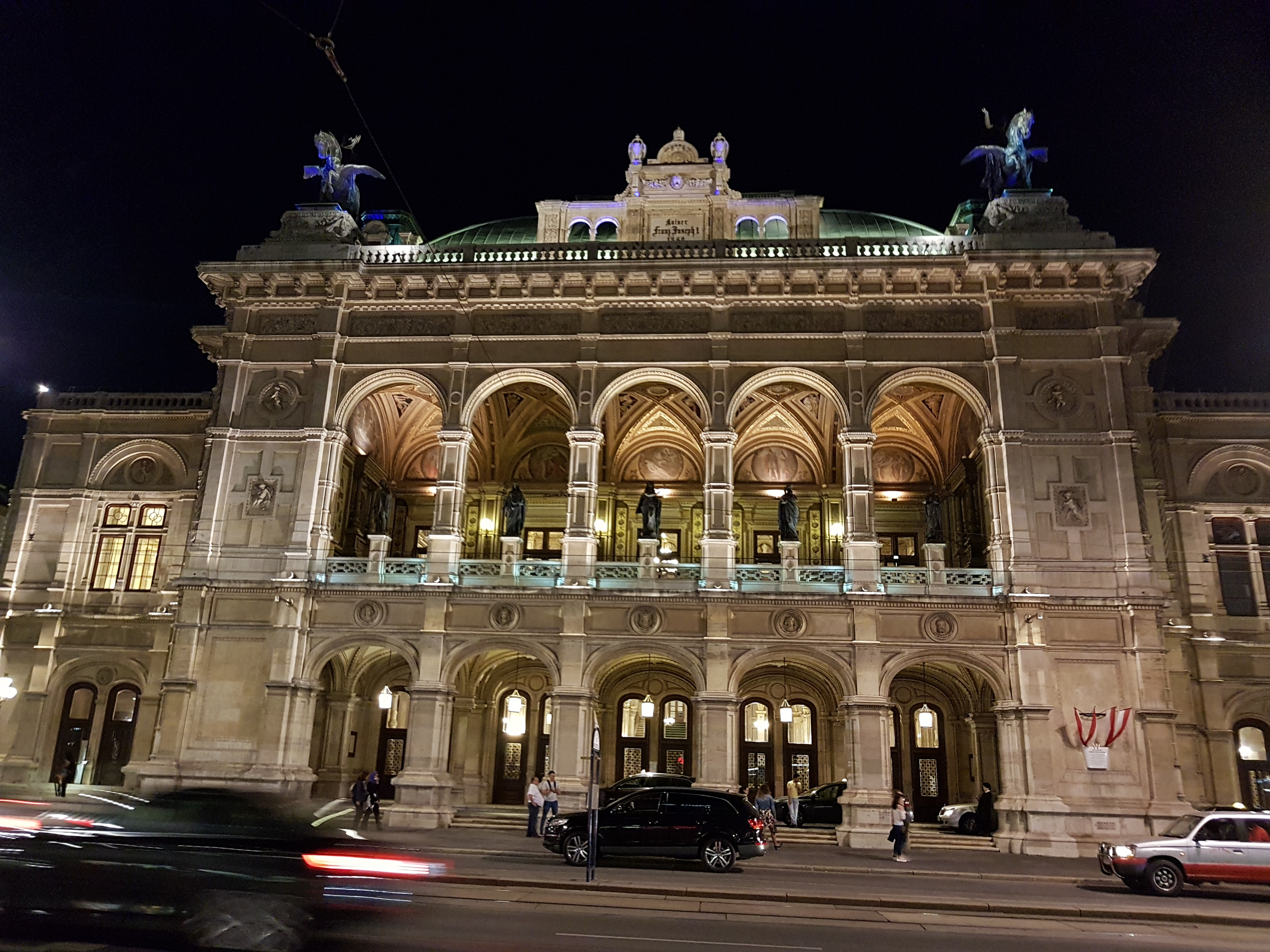
Vienna State Opera, Vienna

- Bregenzer Festspiele, Bregenz
- Stadtheater Baden, Baden bei Wien
- Graz Opera, Graz
- Musiktheater Linz, Linz
- Neue Oper Wien, Vienna
- Salzburg Festival, Salzburg
- Salzburger Landestheater, Salzburg
- Schlosstheater Schönbrunn, Vienna
- Theater an der Wien, Vienna; historic theatre associated with Mozart's time
- Theater Klagenfurt, Klagenfurt
- Volksoper Wien (Vienna People's Opera), Vienna
- Wiener Kammeroper (Vienna Chamber Opera), Vienna
- Wiener Staatsoper (Vienna State Opera), Vienna

=== Azerbaijan ===
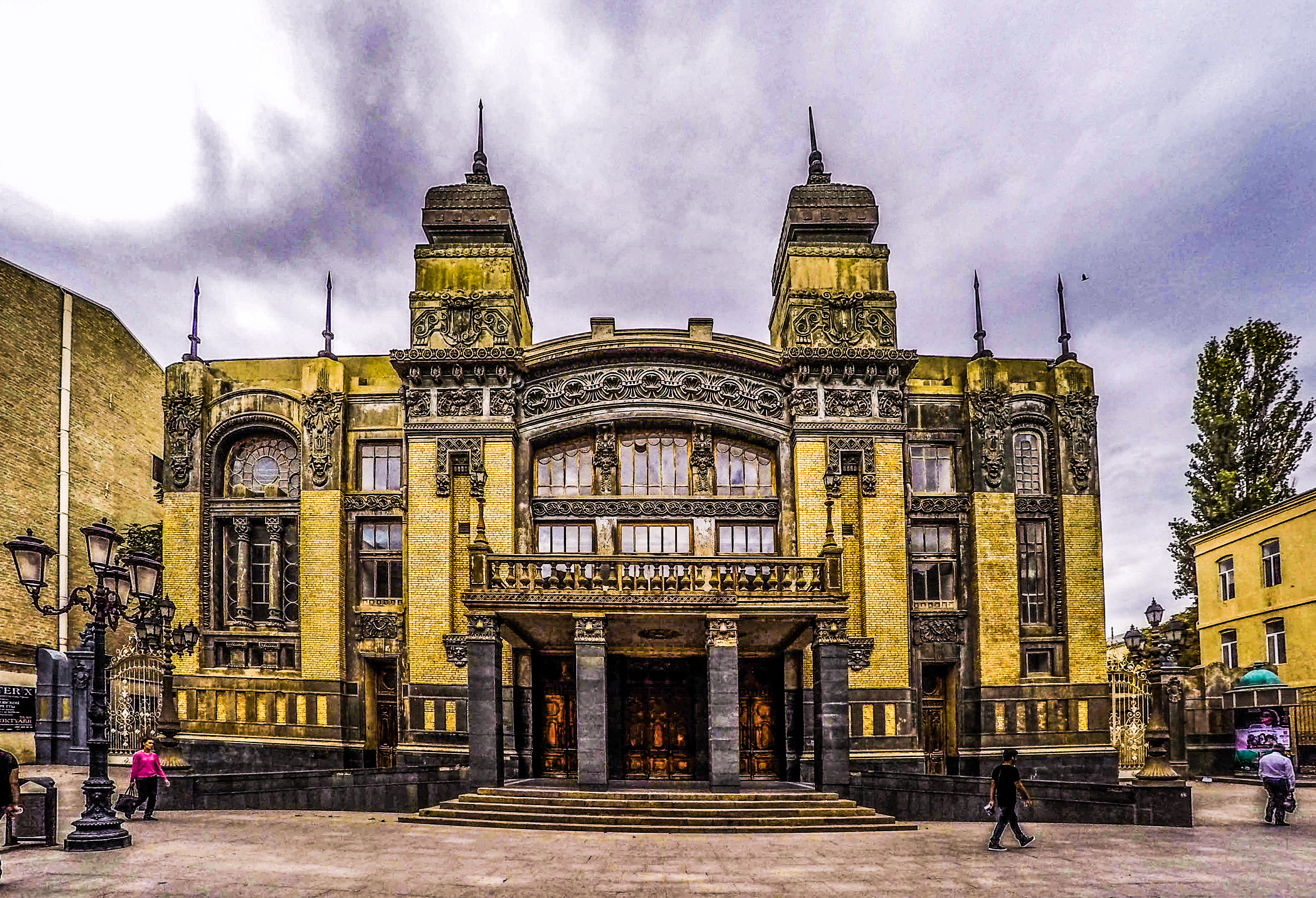
Opera and Ballet Theatre, Baku

- Azerbaijan State Academic Opera and Ballet Theater, Baku

=== Belarus ===
- National Opera and Ballet of Belarus, Minsk

=== Belgium ===
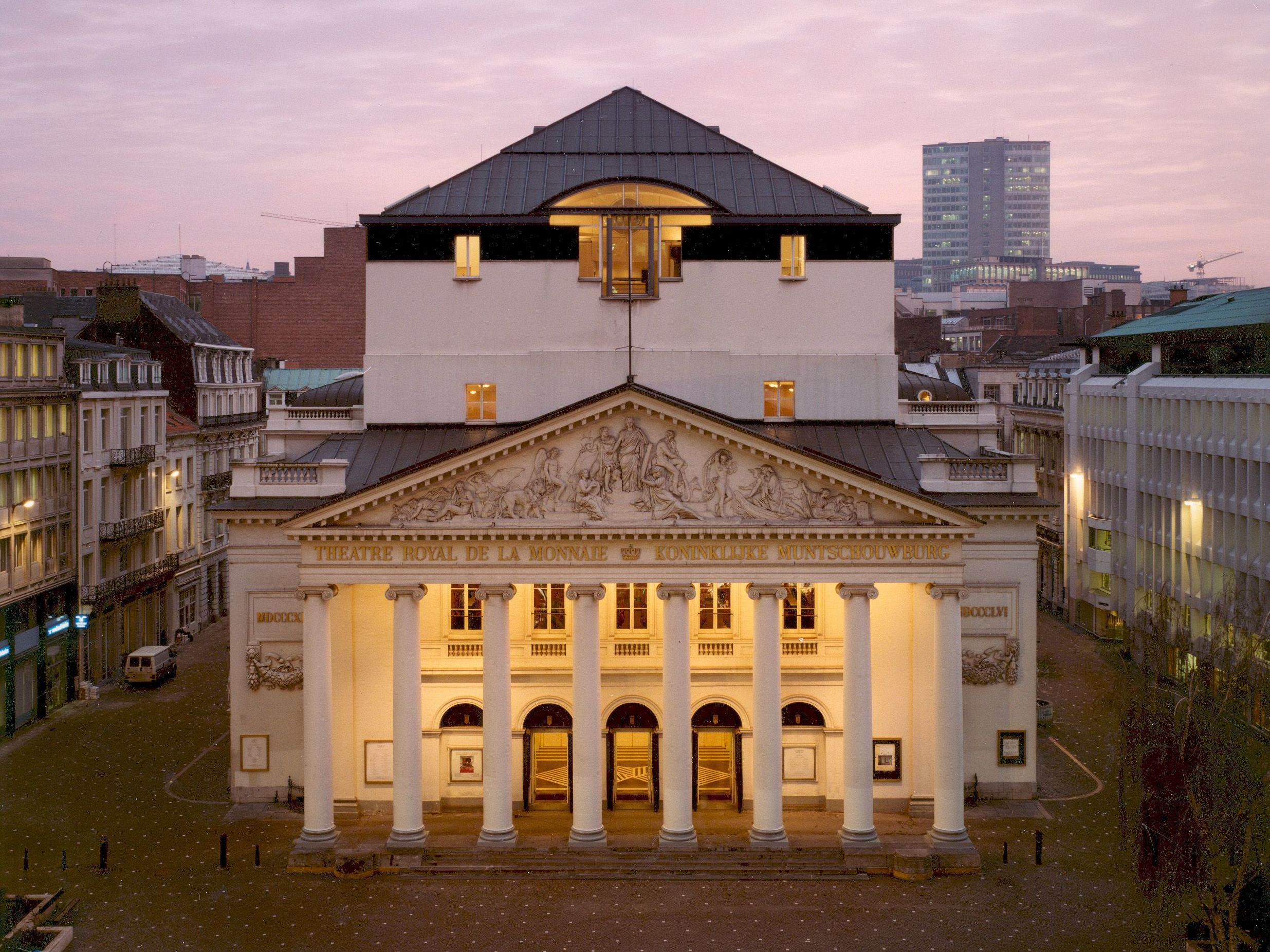
La Monnaie, Brussels

- La Monnaie/De Munt (Royal Theatre of the Mint), Brussels
- Opéra Royal de Wallonie, Liège
- Vlaamse Opera, Antwerp
- Vlaamse Opera, Ghent

=== Bosnia and Herzegovina ===
- National Theatre Opera and Ballet, Sarajevo

=== Bulgaria ===
- Burgas Opera Theatre, Burgas
- National Opera and Ballet, Sofia
- Ruse State Opera, Ruse
- State Opera Plovdiv, Plovdiv
- State Opera Stara Zagora, Stara Zagora
- Varna Opera Theatre, Varna

=== Croatia ===
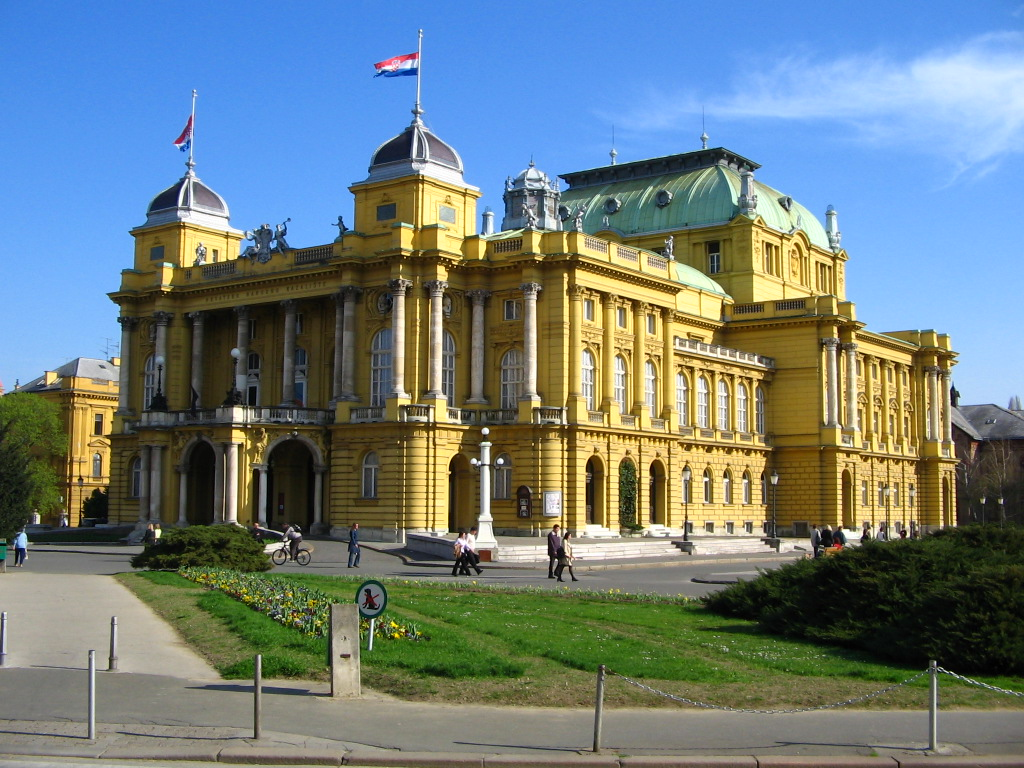
Croatian National Theatre, Zagreb

- Croatian National Theatre, Osijek
- Ivan Zajc Croatian National Theatre, Rijeka
- Croatian National Theatre, Split
- Croatian National Theatre, Varaždin
- Croatian National Theatre in Zagreb, Zagreb
- Croatian National Theatre, Zadar

=== Czech Republic ===
- National Theatre (Národní divadlo), Prague
- The State Opera (Státní opera), Prague
- Estates Theatre (Stavovské divadlo), Prague

=== Denmark ===
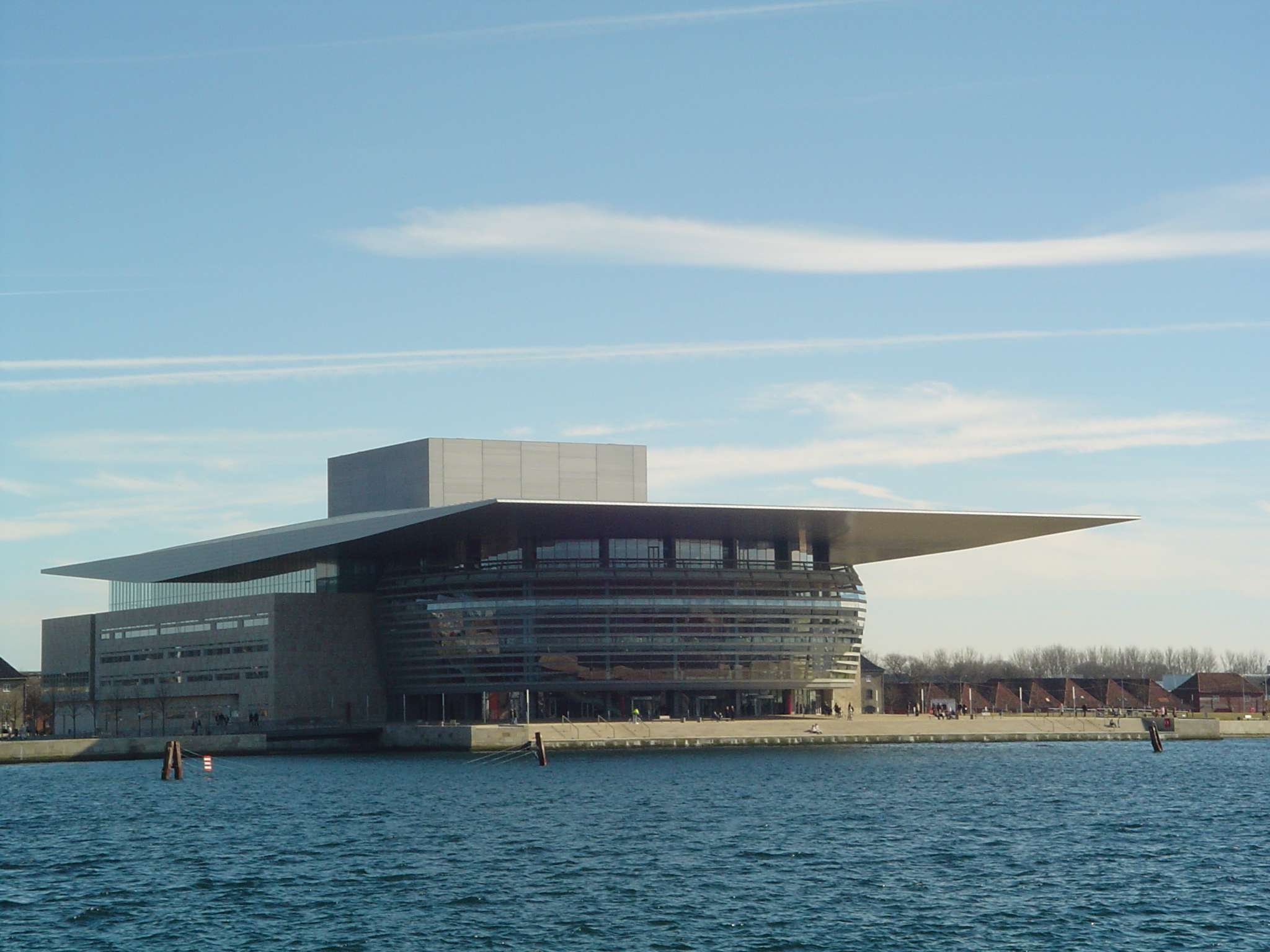
Copenhagen Opera House

- The Copenhagen Opera House (Operaen), Copenhagen
- Den Jyske Opera, Aarhus
- Det Kongelige Teater (Royal Danish Theatre), Copenhagen
- Funen Opera, Odense
- Opera Hedeland, Hedehusene

=== Estonia ===
- Estonian National Opera (Rahvusooper Estonia), Tallinn
- Vanemuine, Tartu

=== Finland ===
- Finnish National Opera and Ballet, Helsinki

=== France ===
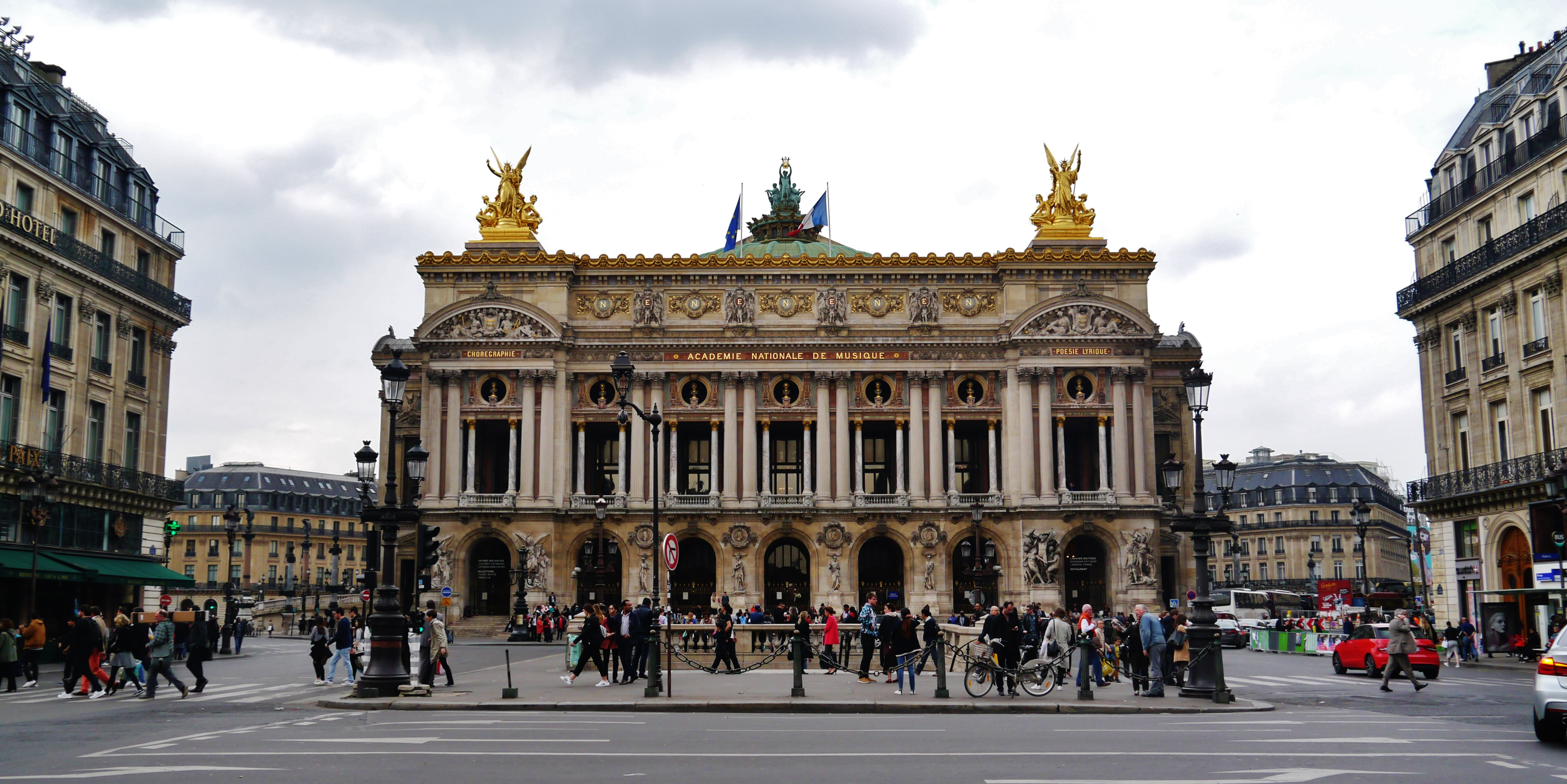
Palais Garnier, Paris

- Grand Théâtre, Angers
- Opéra-théâtre d'Avignon, Avignon
- Opéra Théâtre de Besançon, Besançon
- Grand Théâtre, Bordeaux
- Auditorium de Dijon, Dijon (Opéra de Dijon)
- Grand Théâtre, Dijon (Opéra de Dijon)
- Opéra de Lille, Lille
- Opéra Théâtre de Limoges, Limoges
- Nouvel Opéra, Lyon
- Opéra de Marseille, Marseille
- Opéra-Théâtre de Metz, Metz
- Opéra et Orchestre National de Montpellier Languedoc-Roussillon, Montpellier
- Opéra national de Lorraine, Nancy
- Théâtre Graslin, Nantes
- Opéra de Nice, Nice
- Opéra Bastille, Paris
- Opéra Comique, Paris
- Palais Garnier, Paris
- Théâtre du Châtelet, Paris
- Reims Opera House, Reims
- Opéra de Rennes, Rennes
- Opéra de Rouen, Rouen
- Opéra de Saint-Étienne, Saint-Étienne
- Opéra national du Rhin, Strasbourg
- Opéra de Toulon, Toulon
- Théâtre du Capitole, Toulouse
- Opéra de Tours, Tours
- Royal Opera of Versailles, Versailles

=== Germany ===
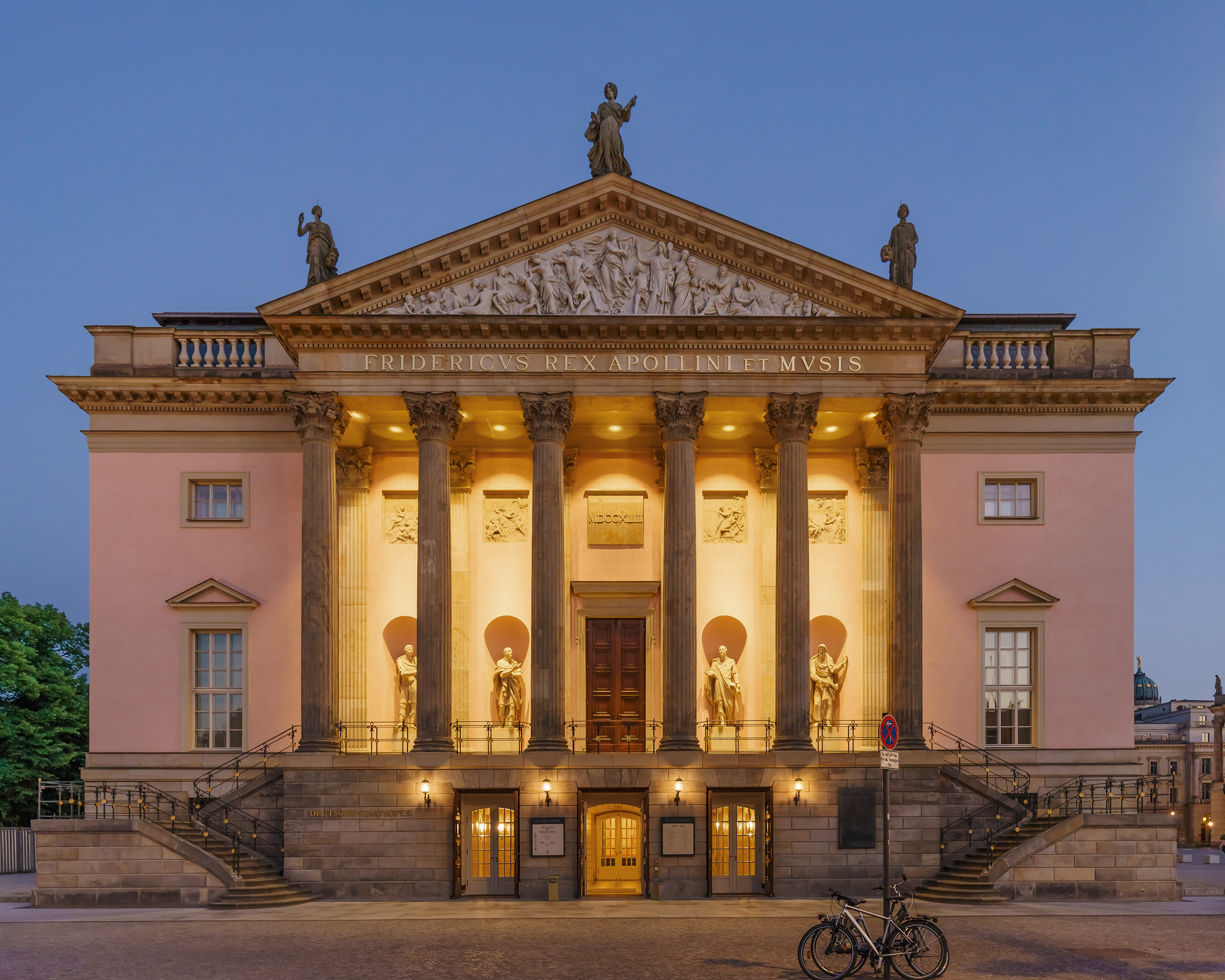
Berlin State Opera, Berlin

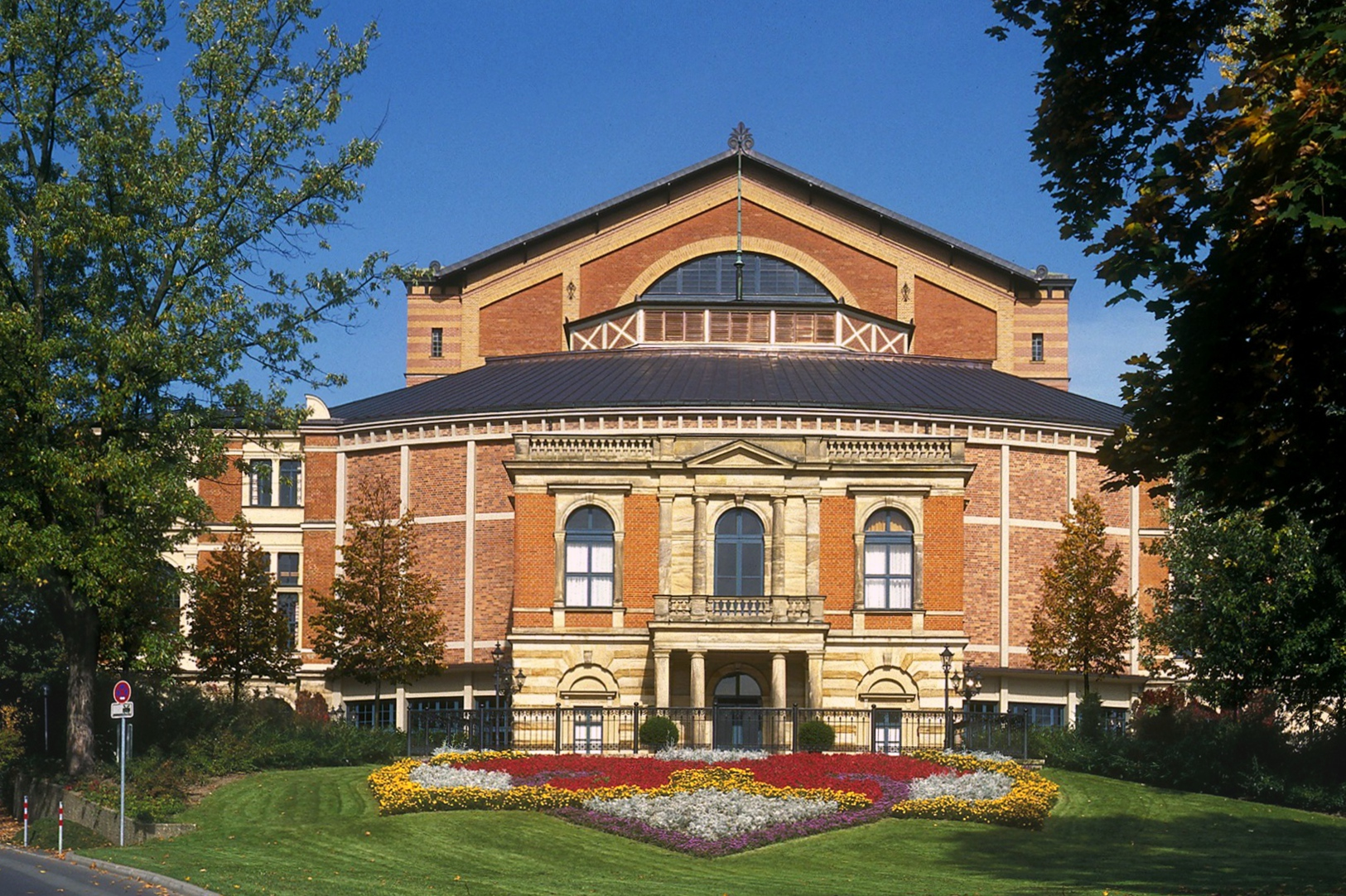
Bayreuth Festspielhaus

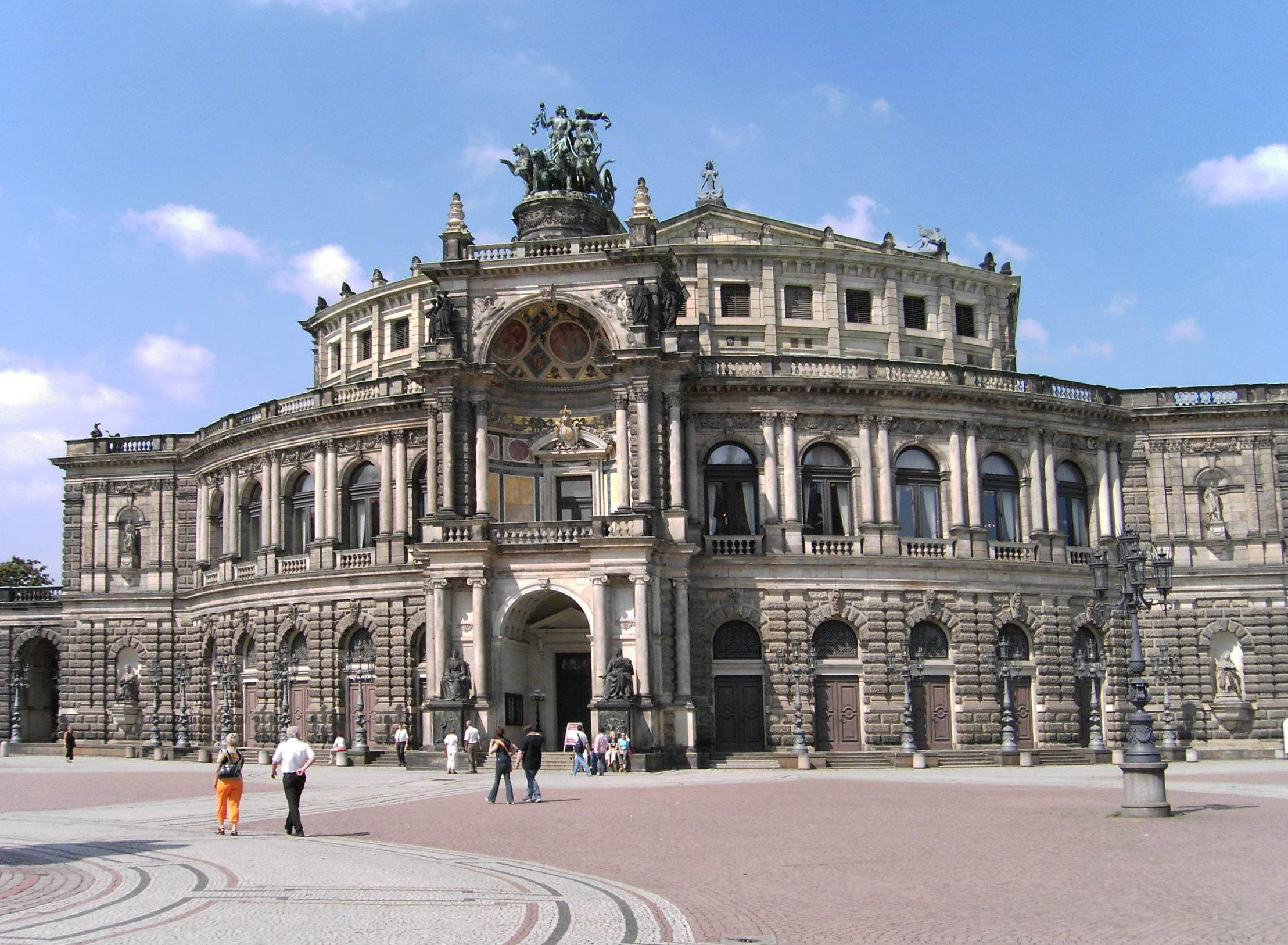
Semperoper, Dresden

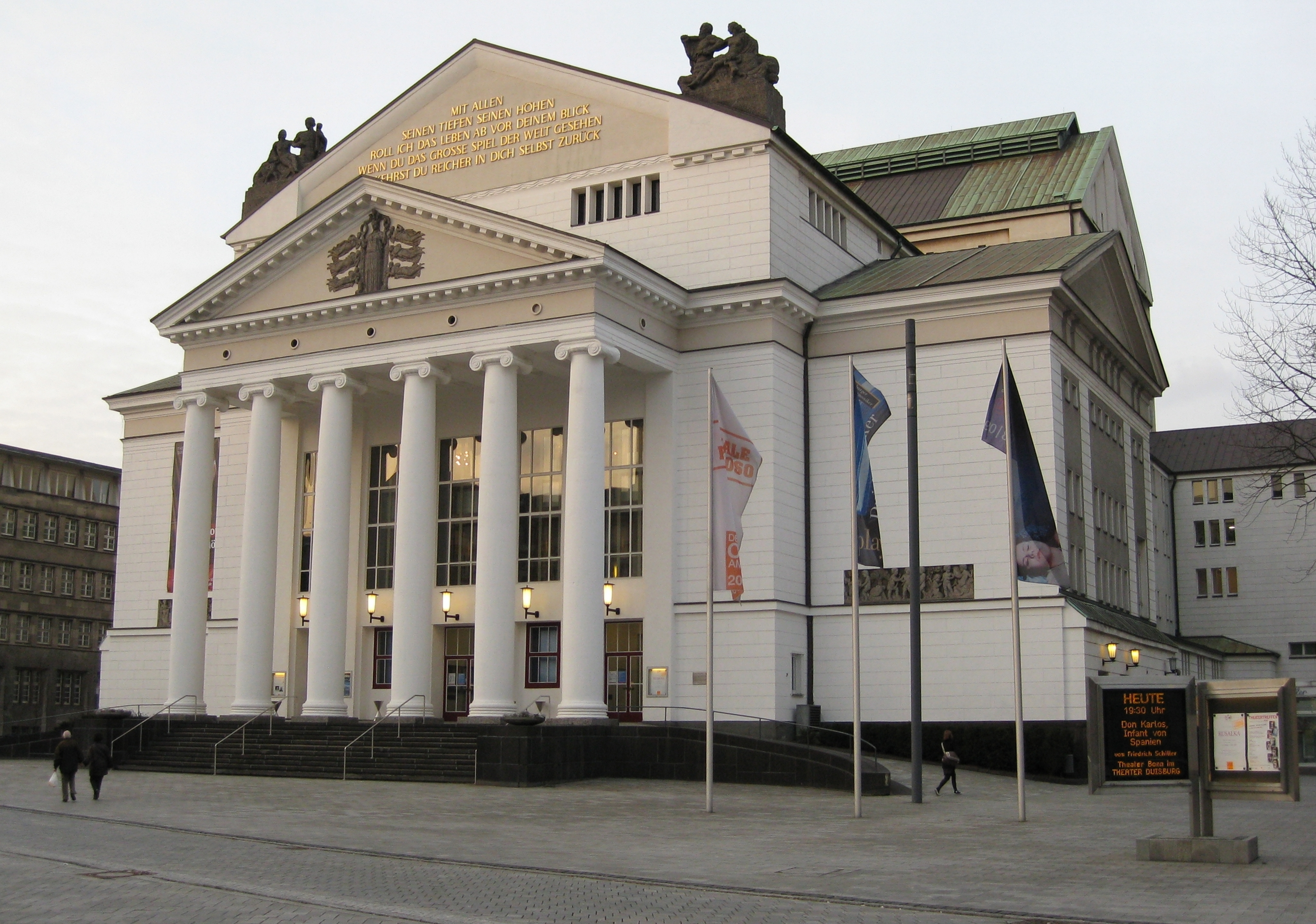
Theater Duisburg (2009)

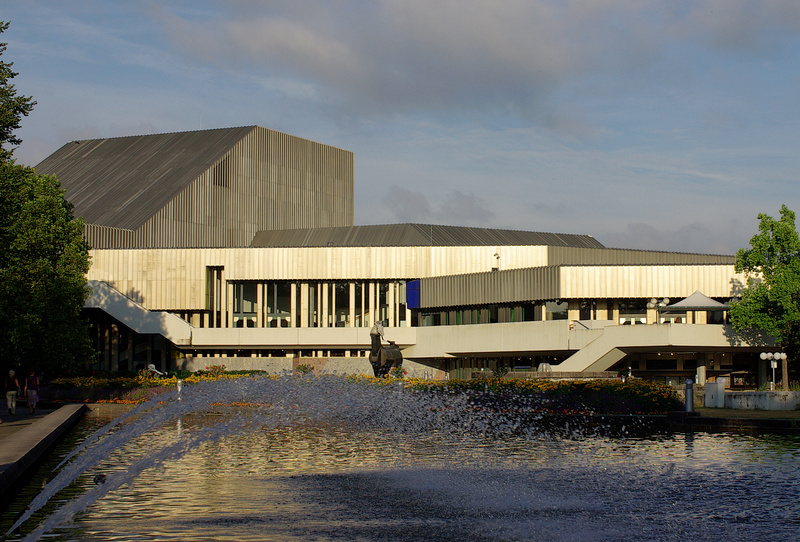
Badisches Staatstheater, Karlsruhe

- Aalto Theatre, Essen
- Alte Oper (former opera house), Frankfurt
- Anhaltisches Theater, Dessau
- Badisches Staatstheater Karlsruhe, Karlsruhe
- Bayreuth Festspielhaus (Bayreuth Festival Theatre), Bayreuth
- Cologne Opera, Cologne
- Cuvilliés Theatre, Munich
- Deutsche Oper am Rhein (German Opera of the Rhine), Düsseldorf
- Deutsche Oper Berlin (Berlin German Opera), Berlin
- Deutsches Nationaltheater Weimar, Weimar
- Dortmund Opera, Dortmund
- Elbe Philharmonic Hall, Hamburg
- Festspielhaus Baden-Baden (Baden-Baden Festival Theatre), Baden-Baden
- Halle Opera House, Halle
- Hamburgische Staatsoper (Hamburg State Opera), Hamburg
- Hessisches Staatstheater Wiesbaden, Wiesbaden
- Opernhaus Kiel, Kiel
- Komische Oper Berlin, Berlin
- Kroll Opera House, Berlin (destroyed in 1943)
- Landestheater Altenburg
- Markgräfliches Opernhaus, Bayreuth
- Mecklenburg State Theatre, Schwerin
- Das Meininger Theater, Meiningen
- Musiktheater im Revier, Gelsenkirchen
- National Theatre Munich (Bavarian State Opera), Munich
- Nationaltheater Mannheim, Mannheim
- Oldenburgisches Staatstheater, Oldenburg (Lower Saxony)
- Oper am Gänsemarkt, Hamburg
- Oper Frankfurt (Frankfurt Opera), Frankfurt
- Oper Leipzig (Leipzig Opera), Leipzig
- Opernhaus am Taschenberg, Dresden (changed to church in 1708, demolished in 1888)
- Opernhaus am Zwinger, Dresden (1719, destroyed 1849)
- Opernhaus Dortmund, Dortmund
- Opernhaus Düsseldorf, Düsseldorf
- Opernhaus Wuppertal, Wuppertal
- Prinzregententheater, Munich
- Saarländisches Staatstheater, Saarbrücken
- Schlosstheater Schwetzingen, Schwetzingen
- Semperoper (Saxon State Opera), Dresden
- Staatsoper Hannover, Hanover
- Staatsoper Unter den Linden (Berlin State Opera), Berlin
- Staatstheater am Gärtnerplatz, Munich
- Staatstheater Braunschweig, Braunschweig
- Staatstheater Darmstadt, Darmstadt
- Staatstheater Kassel, Kassel
- Staatstheater Mainz, Mainz
- Staatstheater Nürnberg, Nuremberg
- Staatstheater Stuttgart, Stuttgart
- Stadttheater Bremerhaven, Bremerhaven
- Stadttheater Minden, Minden
- Theater Bonn, Bonn
- Theater Bremen, Bremen
- Theater Chemnitz, Chemnitz
- Theater Duisburg, Duisburg
- Theater Erfurt, Erfurt
- Theater Heidelberg, Heidelberg
- Theater Lübeck, Lübeck
- Theater Münster, Münster
- Theater Trier, Trier
- Theater Ulm, Ulm

=== Greece ===
- Stavros Niarchos Foundation Cultural Center, Greek National Opera, Athens
- Athens Concert Hall, Athens
- Thessaloniki Concert Hall, Thessaloniki
- Apollon Theatre (Patras), Patras
- Apollon Theater, Syros, Ermoupoli

=== Georgia ===
Georgian National Opera

- Georgian National Opera Theater, Tbilisi
- Kutaisi State Opera, Kutaisi

=== Hungary ===
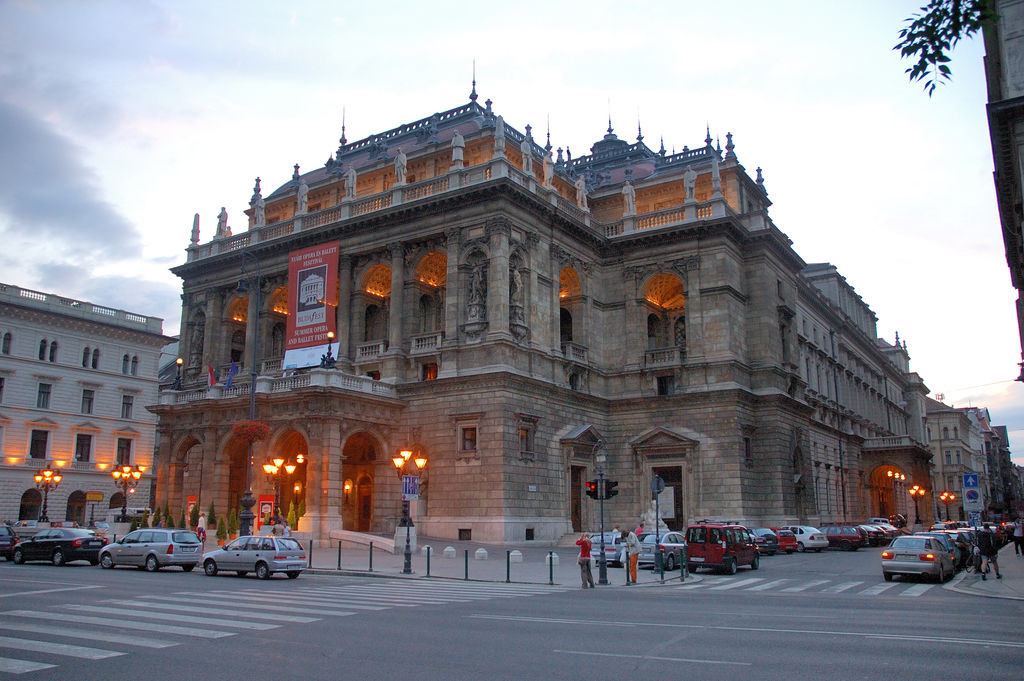
Hungarian State Opera House

- Budapest Operetta Theatre (Budapesti Operettszínház), Budapest
- Erkel Theatre (Erkel Színház), Budapest
- Hungarian State Opera House (Magyar Állami Operaház), Budapest

=== Iceland ===
- The Icelandic Opera (Íslenska Óperan), Reykjavík
- Icelandic National Opera, Reykjavík

=== Ireland ===
- Cork Opera House, Cork
- Theatre Royal, Wexford
- Wexford Opera House

=== Italy ===
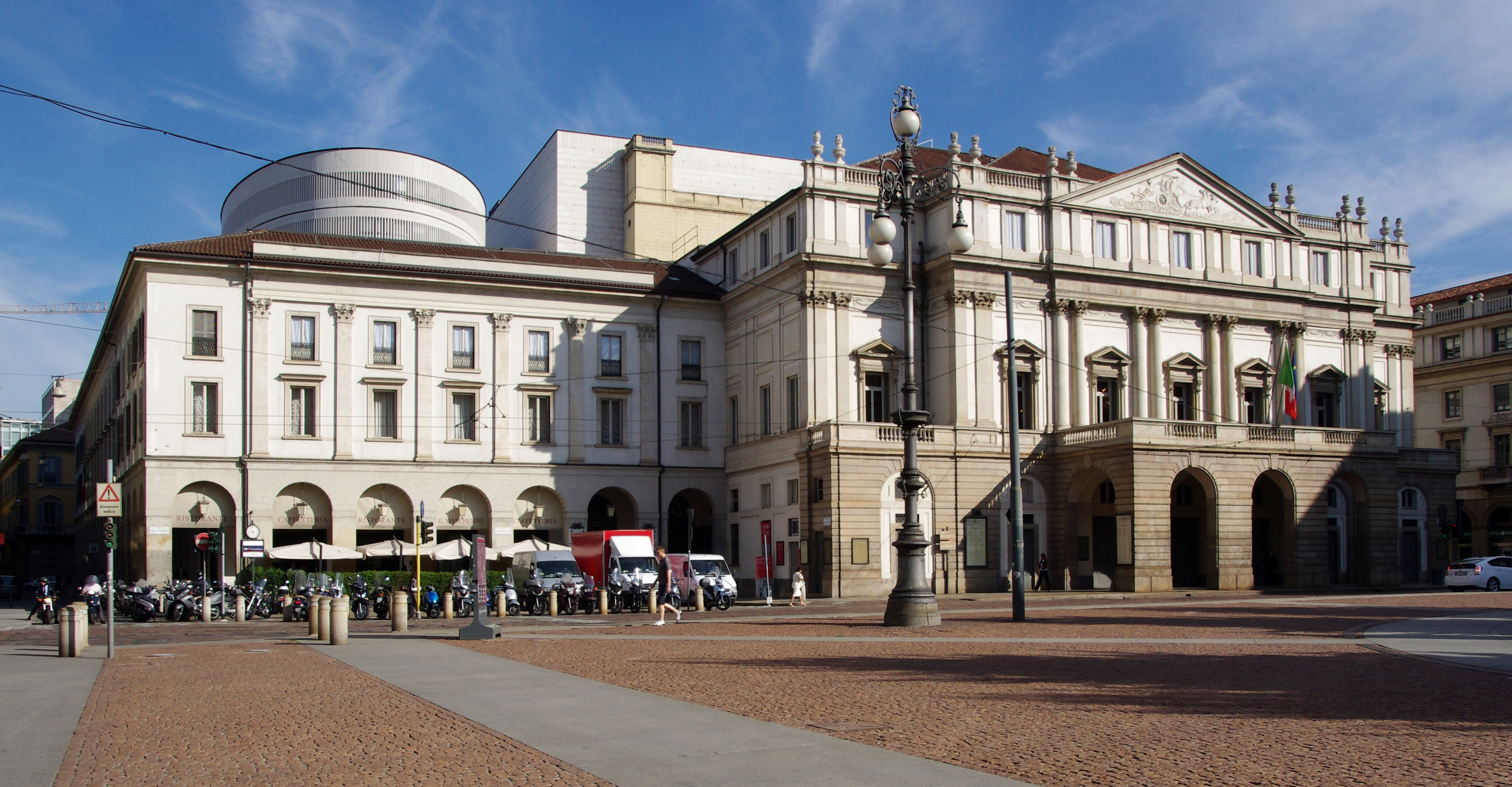
La Scala, Milan

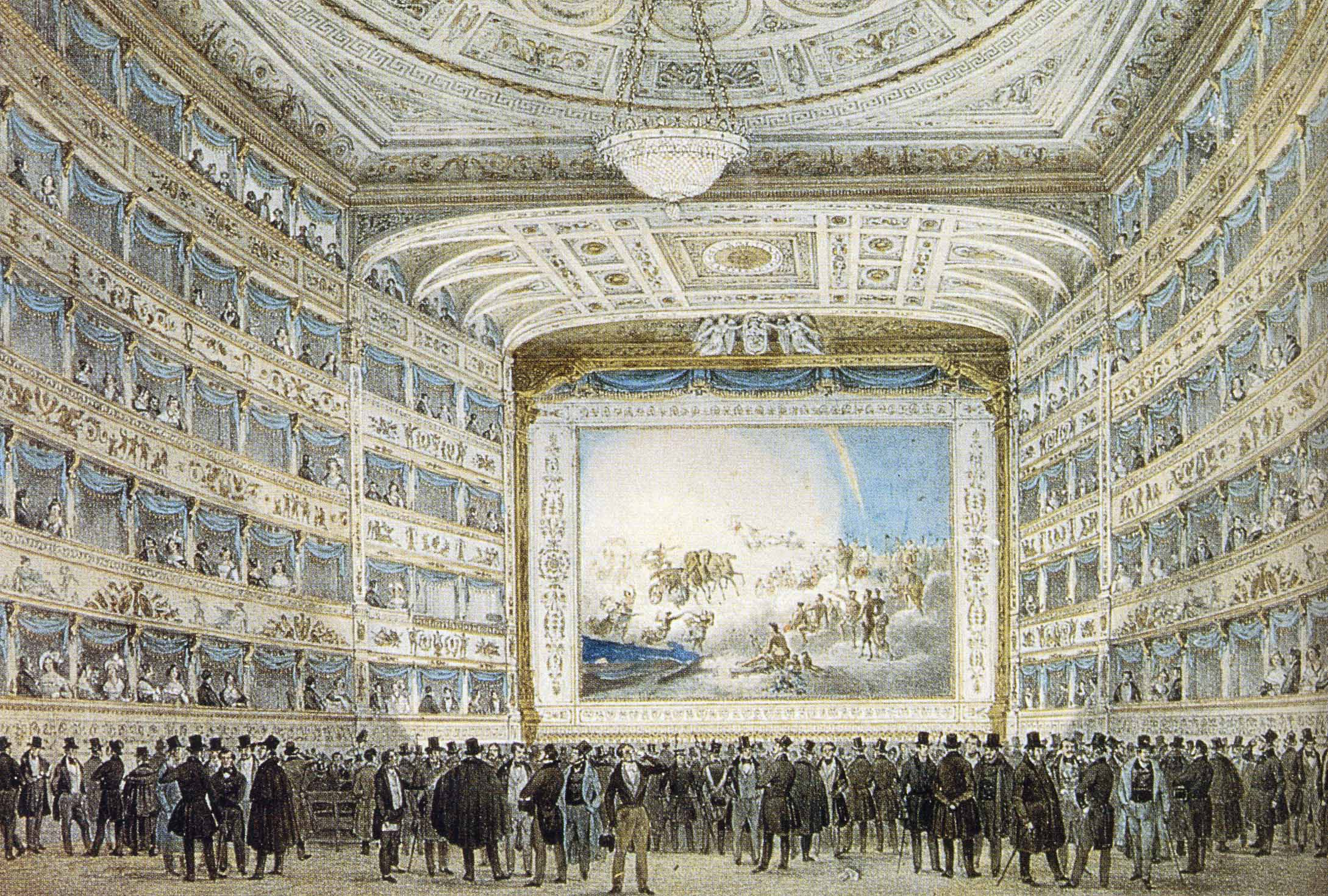
Interior: La Fenice, Venice, 1837

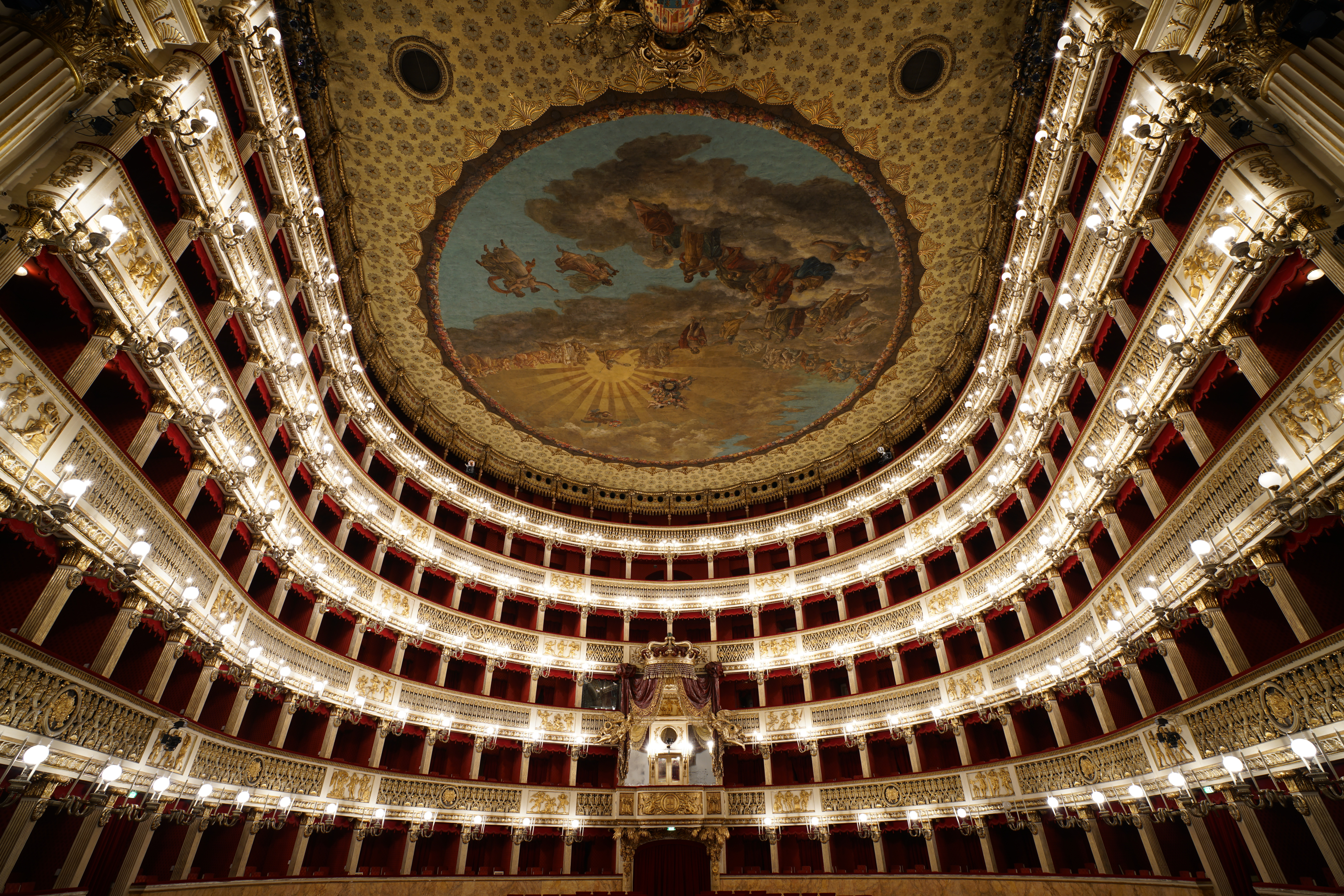
Interior: Teatro San Carlo, Naples

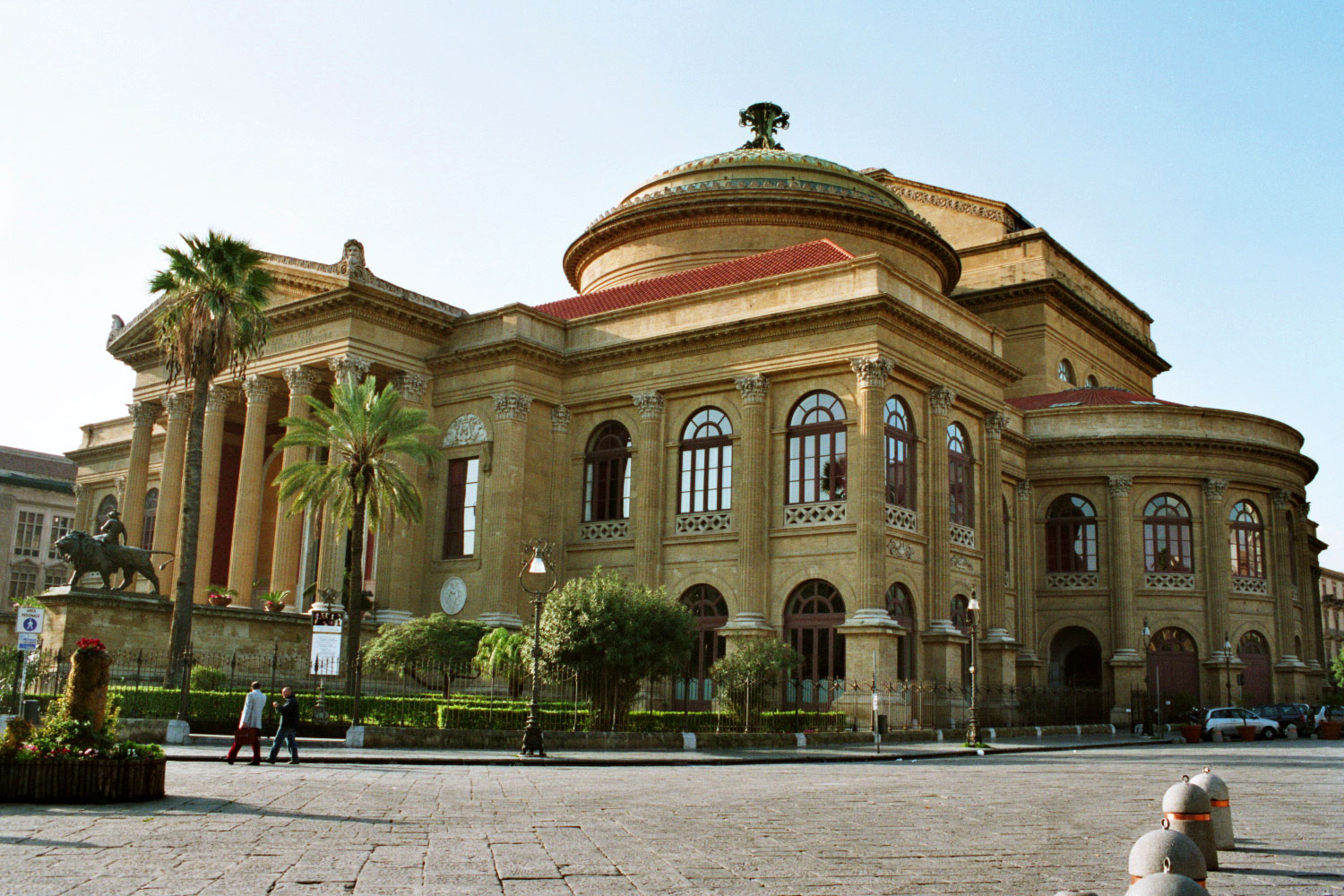
Teatro Massimo, Palermo, biggest theater in Italy and third in Europe

- Arena di Verona, Verona
- Opera di Firenze, Florence
- Sferisterio, Macerata
- Teatro Alessandro Bonci, Cesena
- Teatro Alfieri, Asti
- Teatro Alfieri, Florence
- Teatro Alfieri, Turin
- Teatro alla Scala, Milan
- Teatro Apollo, Lecce
- Teatro Biondo, Palermo
- Teatro Argentina, Rome
- Teatro Augusteo, Naples
- Teatro Bellini, Naples
- Teatro Capranica, Rome
- Teatro Carignano, Turin
- Teatro Vittorio Emanuele II, Messina
- Teatro Carlo Felice, Genoa
- Teatro Civico, Sassari
- Teatro Civico, Tortona
- Teatro Garibaldi, Enna
- Teatro Coccia, Novara
- Teatro Luigi Pirandello, Agrigento
- Teatro Comunale, Alessandria
- Teatro Comunale, Bologna
- Teatro Comunale, Ferrara
- Teatro Comunale, Florence, cast off in 2014 (and later dismantled)
  and substituted by the newly built Opera di Firenze
- Teatro Comunale, Modena
- Teatro Comunale Alighieri, Ravenna
- Teatro Comunale Carlo Gesualdo, Avellino
- Teatro Re Grillo, Licata
- Teatro Communale G. B. Pergolesi, Jesi
- Teatro Comunale Gabriello Chiabrera, Savona
- Teatro Communale Ponchielli, Cremona
- Teatro Bellini, Palermo
- Teatro Finocchiaro, Palermo
- Teatro Comunale Umberto Giordano, Foggia
- Teatro Comunale Margherita, Racalmuto
- Teatro Comunale Vittorio Emanuele, Benevento
- Teatro Curci, Barletta
- Teatro dell'Opera di Roma, Rome
- Teatro del Giglio, Lucca
- Teatro Regina Margherita, Caltanissetta
- Teatro degli Arcimboldi, Milan
- Teatro degli Industri, Grosseto
- Teatro comunale Vittoria Colonna, Vittoria
- Teatro della Gran Guardia, Livorno
- Teatro della Pergola, Florence
- Teatro delle Muse, Ancona
- Teatro Donizetti, Bergamo
- Teatro La Fenice, Venice
- Teatro Garibaldi, Piazza Armerina
- Teatro Lirico, Milan
- Teatro Lirico, Cagliari
- Teatro Filarmonico, Verona
- Teatro Selinus, Castelvetrano
- Teatro Francesco Cilea, Reggio Calabria
- Teatro Fraschini, Pavia
- Teatro Garibaldi, Modica
- Teatro Giuseppe Verdi, Busseto
- Teatro Grande, Brescia
- Teatro Comunale, Noto
- Teatro Lirico, Milan
- Teatro Lirico, Cagliari
- Teatro Lirico Giuseppe Verdi, Trieste
- Teatro Malibran, Venice
- Teatro Marrucino, Chieti
- Teatro Massimo, Palermo
- Teatro Massimo Bellini, Catania
- Teatro Mario Del Monaco, Treviso
- Teatro Comunale Eliodoro Sollima, Marsala
- Teatro Mercadante, Naples
- Teatro Morlacchi, Perugia
- Teatro Municipale, Piacenza
- Teatro comunale, Siracusa
- Teatro Municipale Valli, Reggio Emilia
- Teatro Municipale Giuseppe Verdi, Salerno
- Teatro Petruzzelli, Bari
- Teatro Piccinni, Bari
- Teatro Sangiorgi, Catania
- Teatro Politeama, Catanzaro
- Teatro Politeama, Lecce
- Teatro Politeama Garibaldi, Palermo
- Teatro Regio Ducale, Milan (burned down in 1776; replaced by Teatro alla Scala)
- Teatro Regio di Parma, Parma
- Teatro Regio Torino, Turin
- Teatro Rossini, Lugo
- Teatro Rossini, Pesaro
- Teatro San Carlo, Naples
- Teatro Sannazzaro, Naples
- Teatro Sociale, Como
- Teatro Sociale di Mantova, Mantua
- Teatro Verdi, Padua
- Teatro Verdi, Pisa

=== Latvia ===
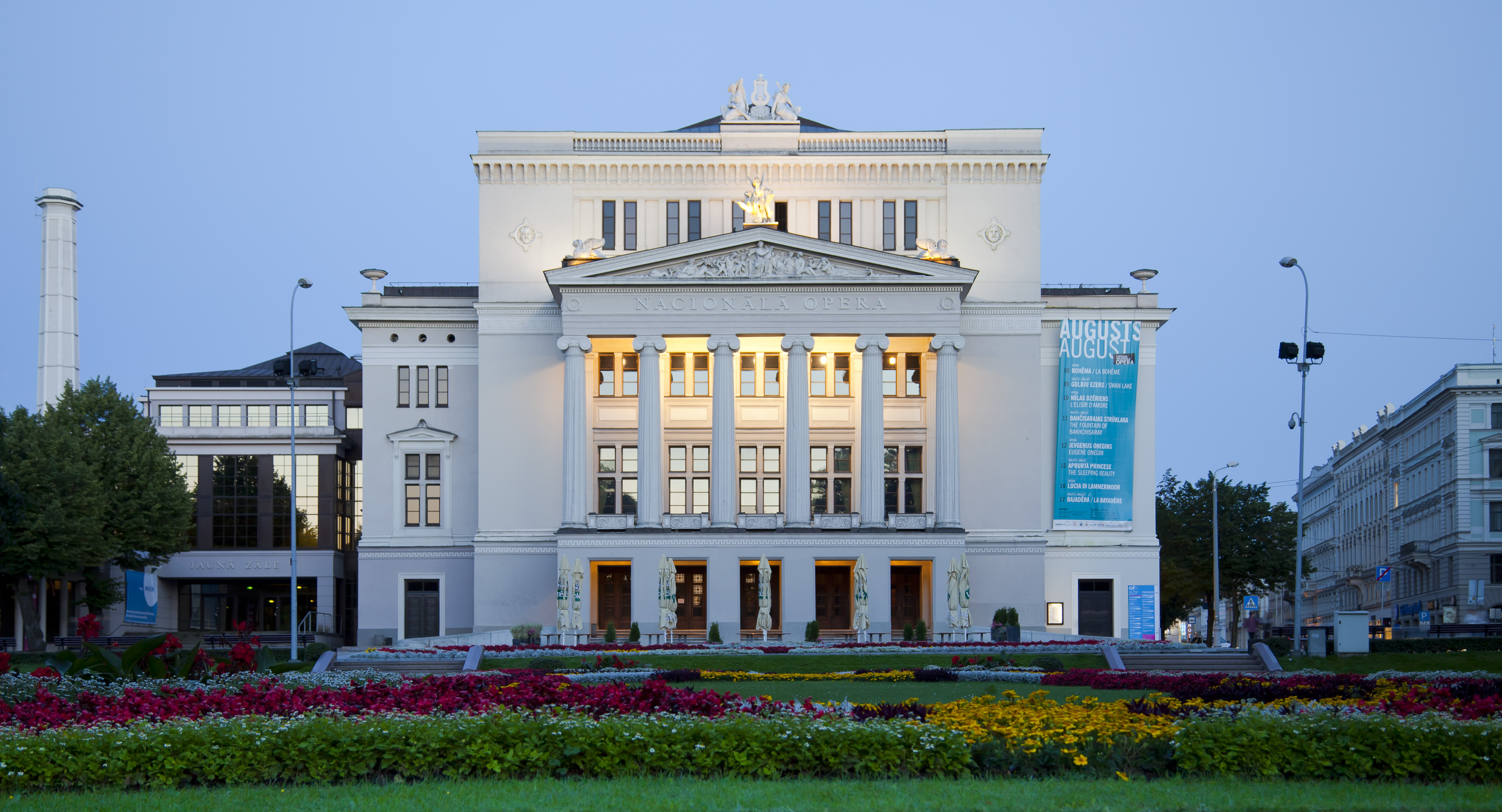
Latvian National Opera

- Latvian National Opera (LNO, Latvijas Nacionālā Opera), Riga

=== Lithuania ===
- Lithuanian National Opera and Ballet Theatre (Lietuvos nacionalinis operos ir baleto teatras), Vilnius
- Kaunas State Musical Theatre (Kauno valstybinis muzikinis teatras), Kaunas
- Klaipėda State Musical Theatre, Klaipėda

=== Malta ===
- Aurora Opera House, Victoria, Gozo
- Manoel Theatre, Valletta
- Royal Opera House, Valletta (destroyed)

=== Moldova ===
- National Opera and Ballet Theatre, Chișinău

=== Monaco ===
- Opéra de Monte-Carlo

=== Netherlands ===
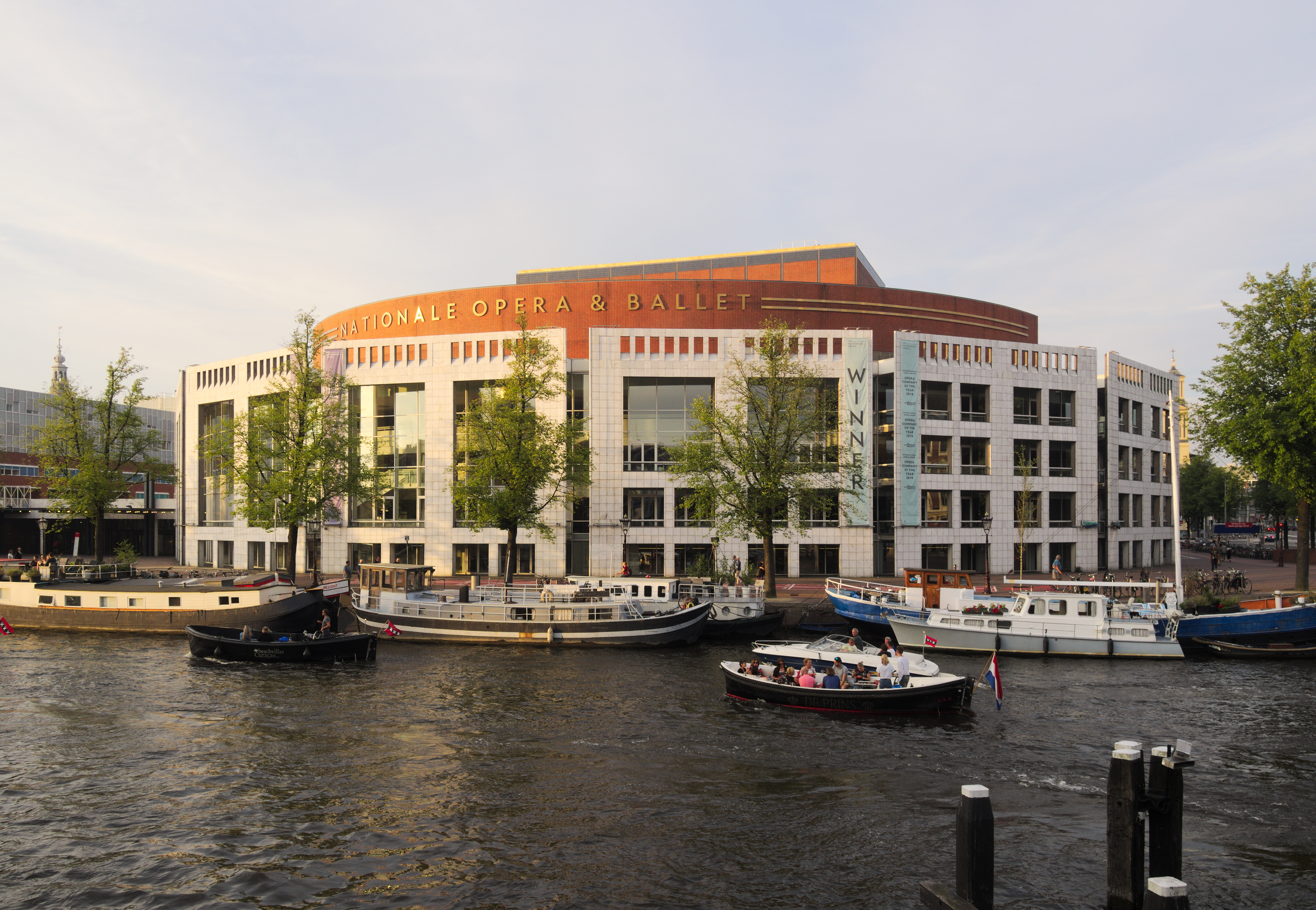
Dutch National Opera & Ballet, Amsterdam

- Dutch National Opera & Ballet, Amsterdam

=== North Macedonia ===
- National Opera and Ballet

=== Norway ===
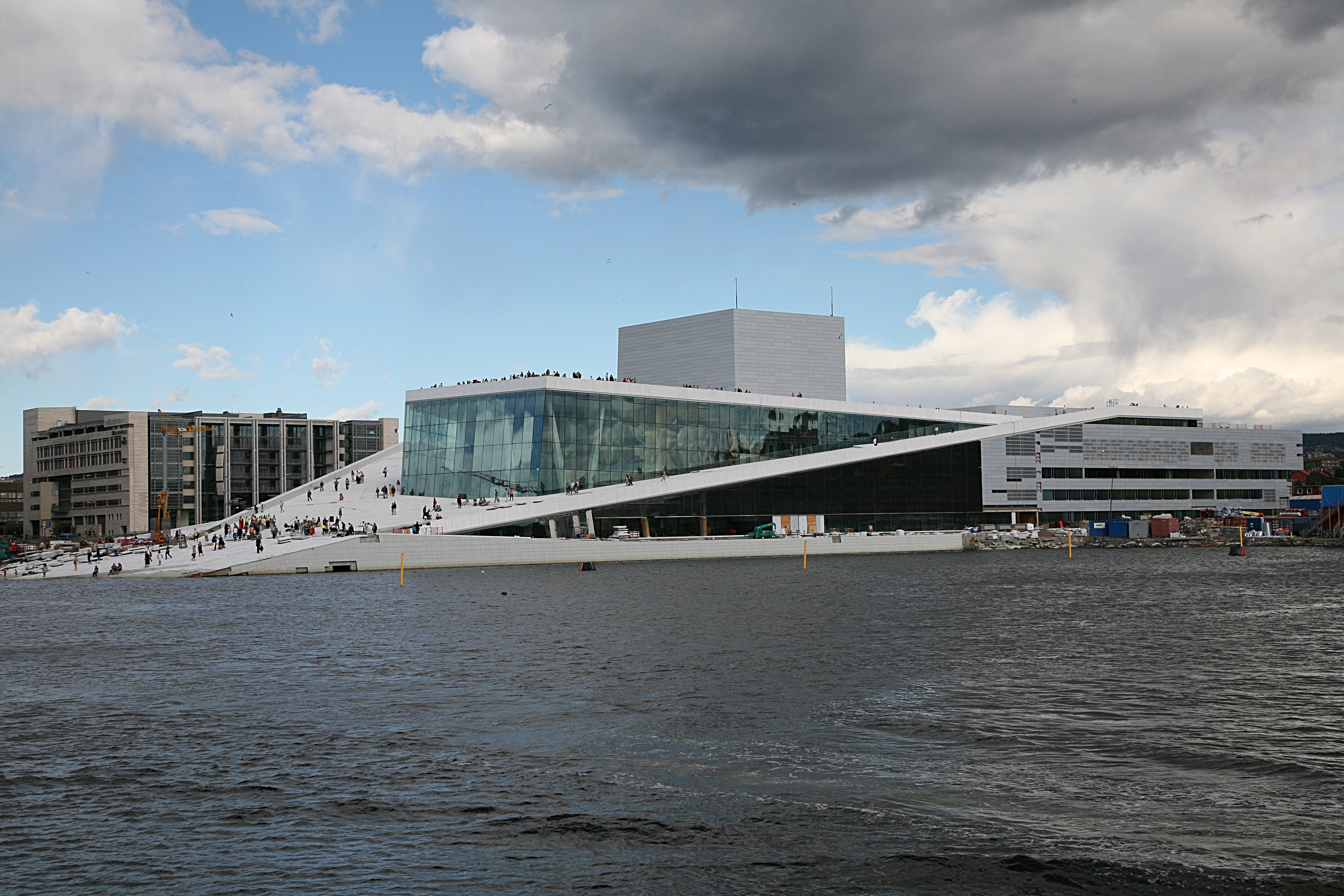
The new opera house, Oslo, Norway

- Den Norske Opera (Norwegian National Opera), Oslo
- Operaen i Kristiansund
- Operahuset Nordfjord

=== Poland ===
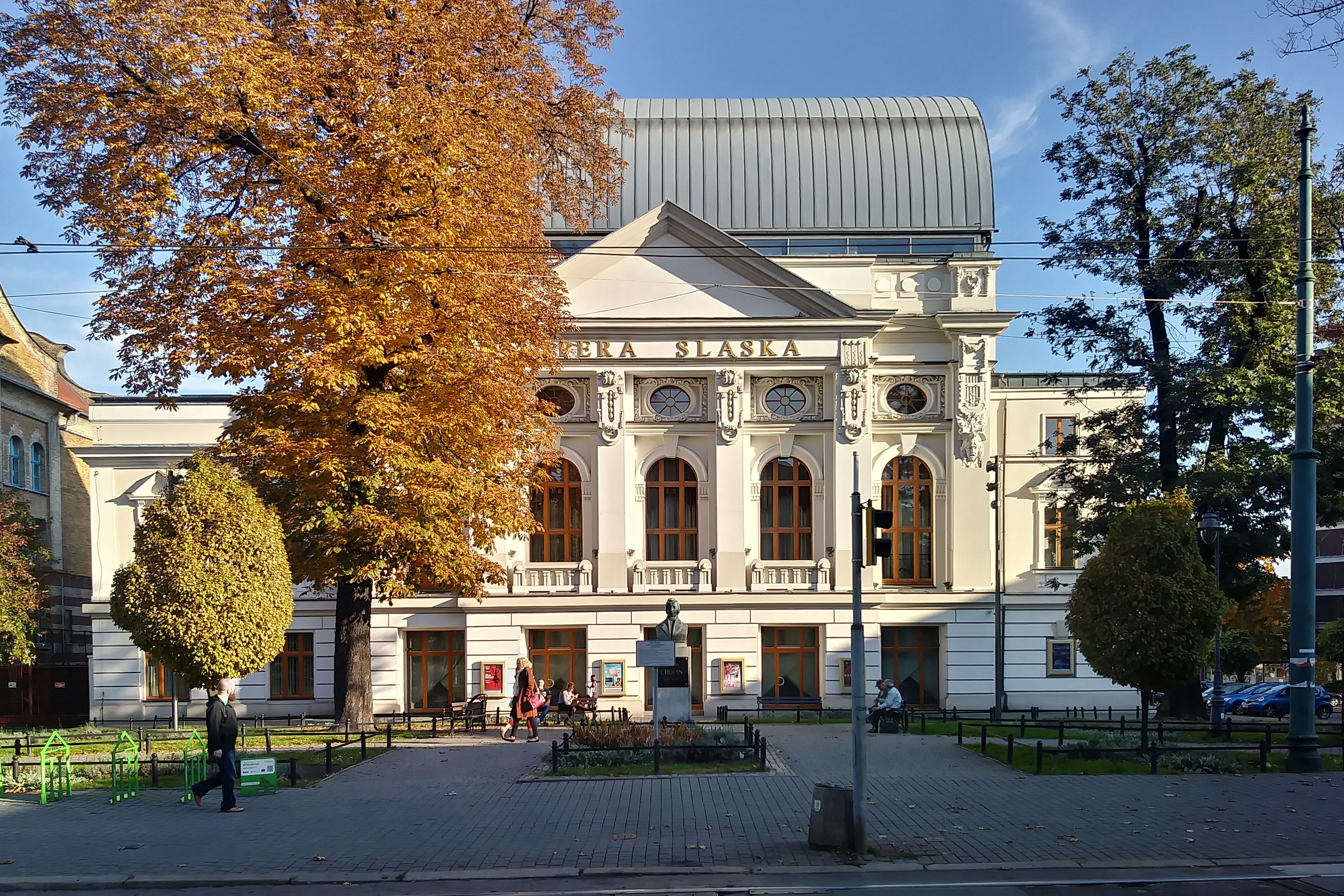
Silesian Opera in Bytom

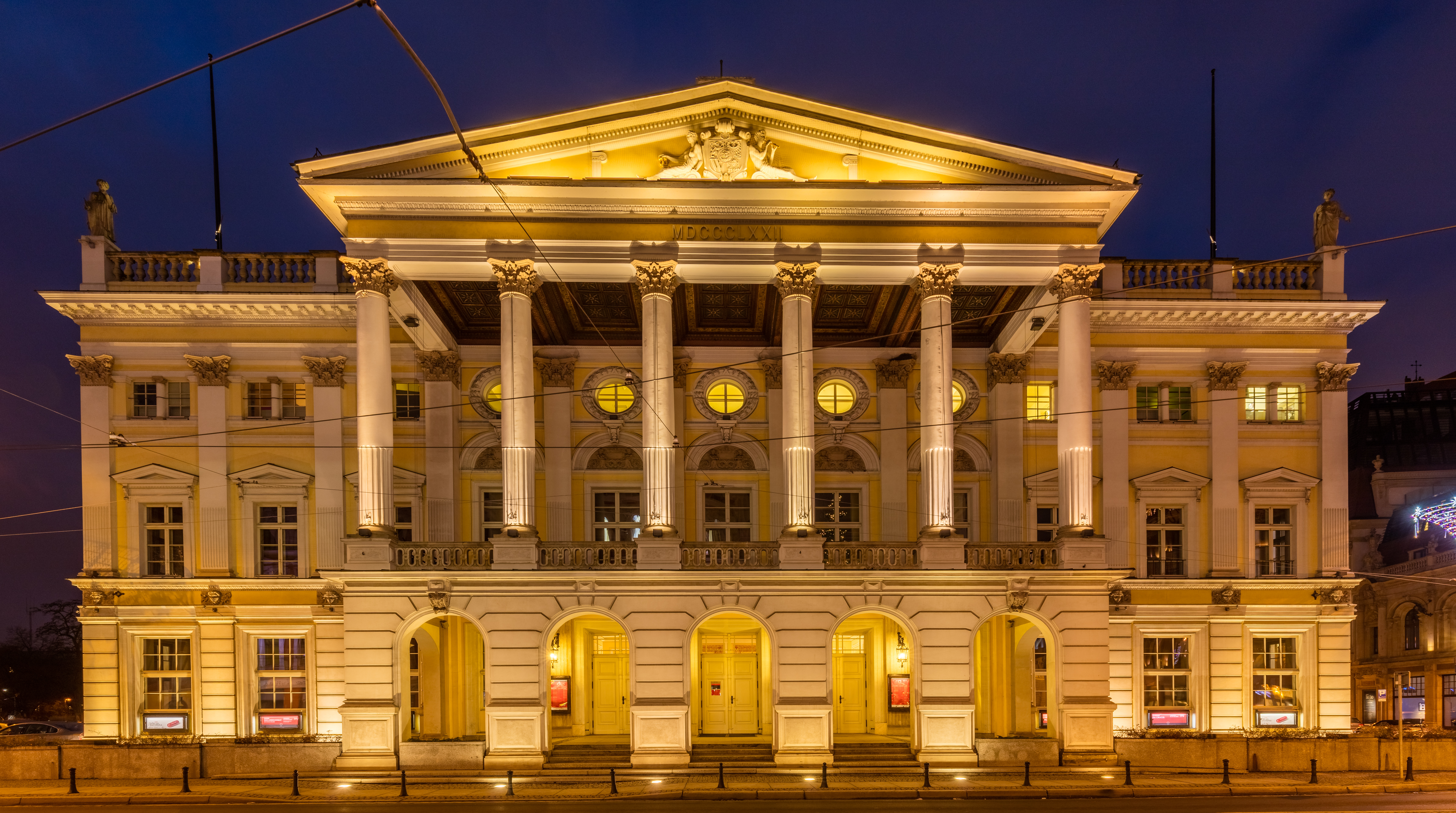
Wrocław Opera in Wrocław

- Baltic State Opera, Gdańsk
- Teatr Muzyczny w Gdyni, Gdynia
- Court Opera in Łazienki complex, Warsaw
- Forest Opera, Sopot
- Grand Theatre, Łódź
- Great Theatre, Poznań, Poznań
- Kraków Chamber Opera, Kraków
- Opera in the castle, Szczecin
- Opera Krakowska, Kraków
- Opera Nova, Bydgoszcz
- Opera Podlaska, Białystok
- Polish National Opera (Great Theatre), Warsaw
- Silesian Opera, Bytom
- Teatr Muzyczny w Lublinie, Lublin
- Warsaw Chamber Opera, Warsaw
- Wrocław Opera, Wrocław
- Polish Royal Opera, Warsaw

=== Portugal ===
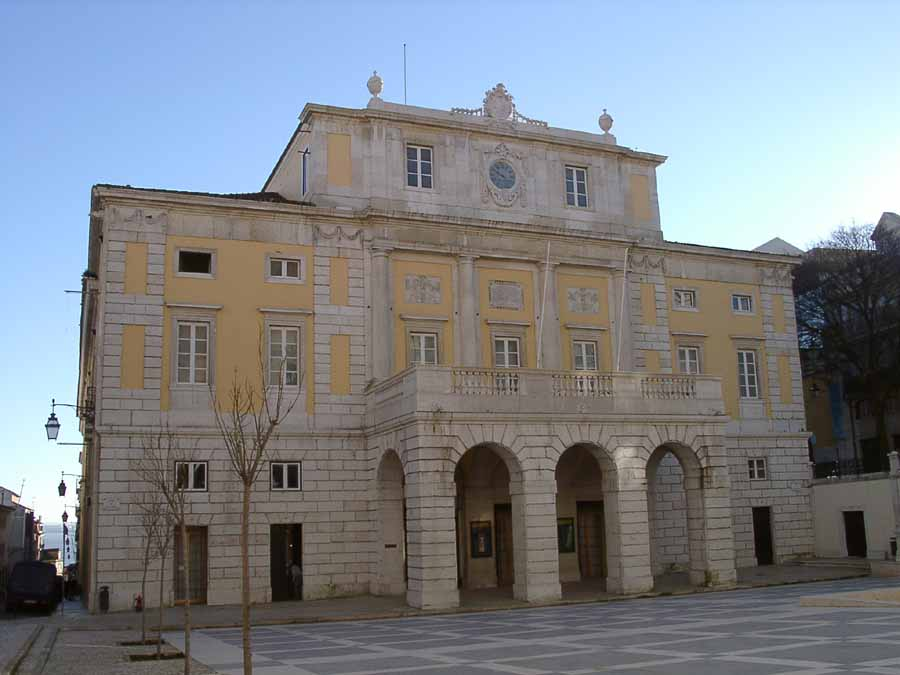
São Carlos main façade, Lisbon

- Casa da Música, Porto
- Teatro Nacional de São Carlos, Lisbon

=== Romania ===
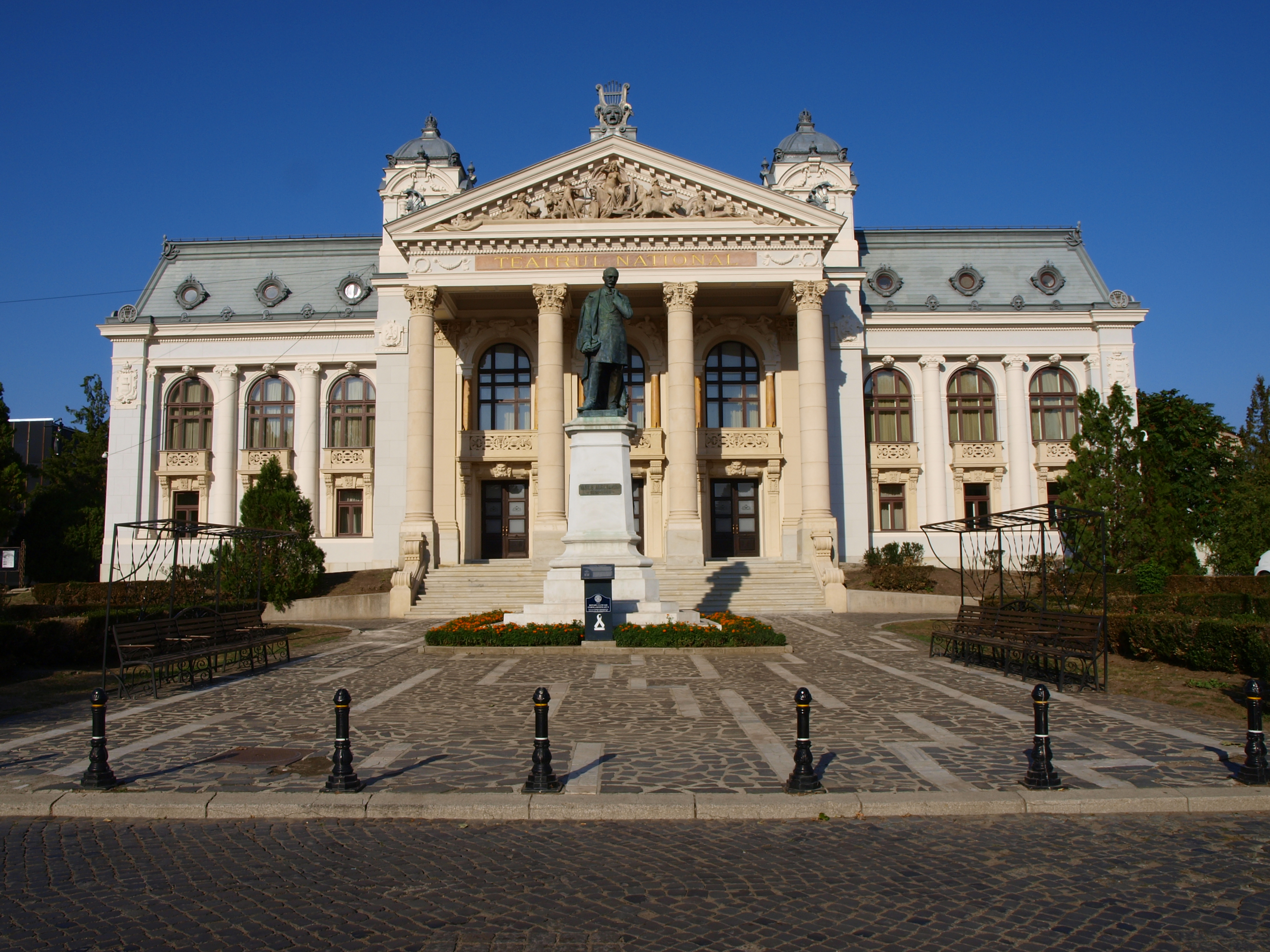
Iaşi Romanian National Opera

- Brașov Opera, Brașov
- Cluj Hungarian Opera, Cluj-Napoca
- Comic Opera House for Children, Bucharest
- Craiova Romanian Opera, Craiova
- Ion Dacian National Operetta Theatre, Bucharest
- Nae Leonard National Opera and Operetta Theatre, Galați
- Oleg Danovski National Opera and Ballet Theatre, Constanța
- Romanian National Opera, Bucharest
- Romanian National Opera, Cluj-Napoca
- Romanian National Opera, Iași
- Romanian National Opera, Timișoara

=== Russia ===
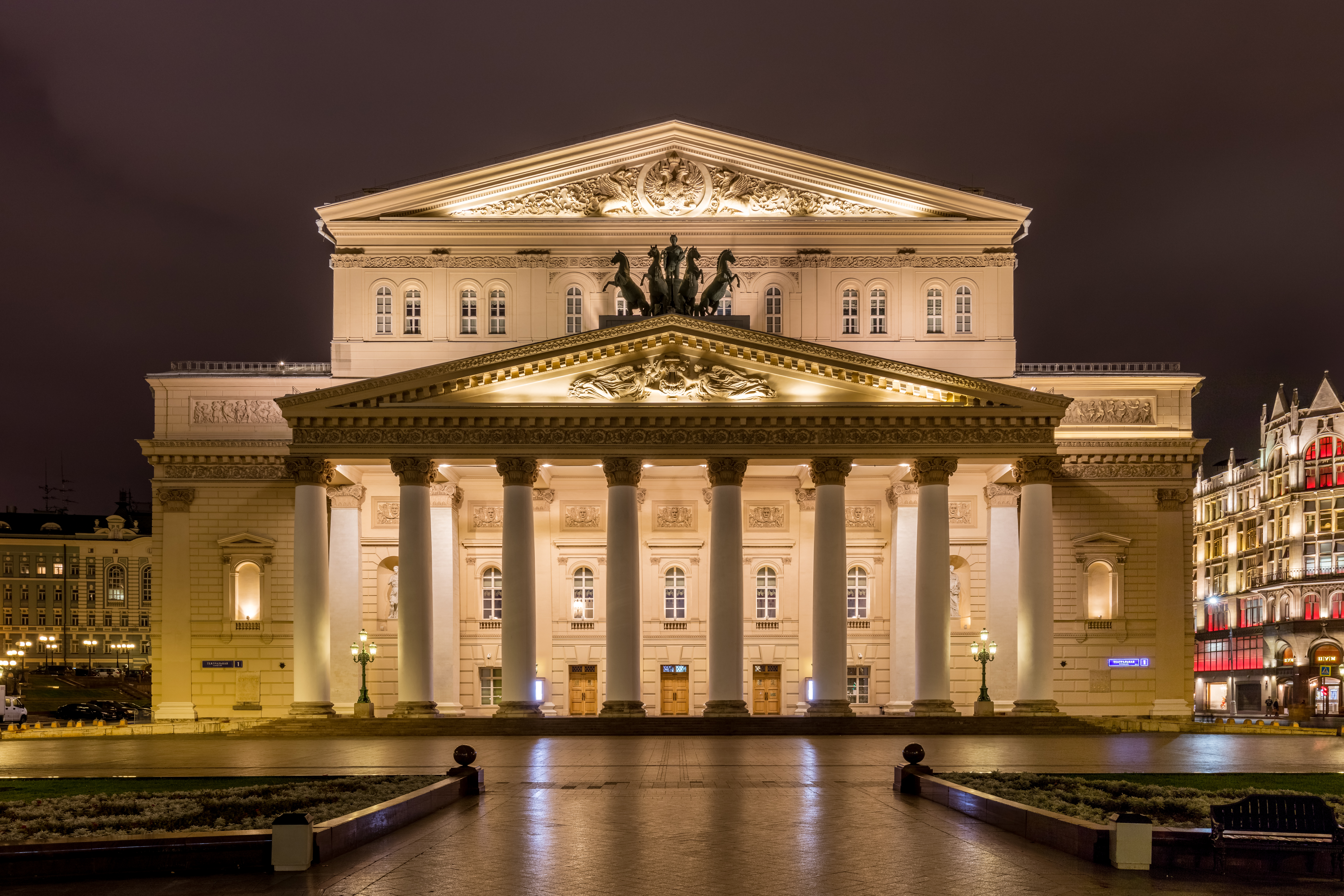
Bolshoi Theatre, Moscow

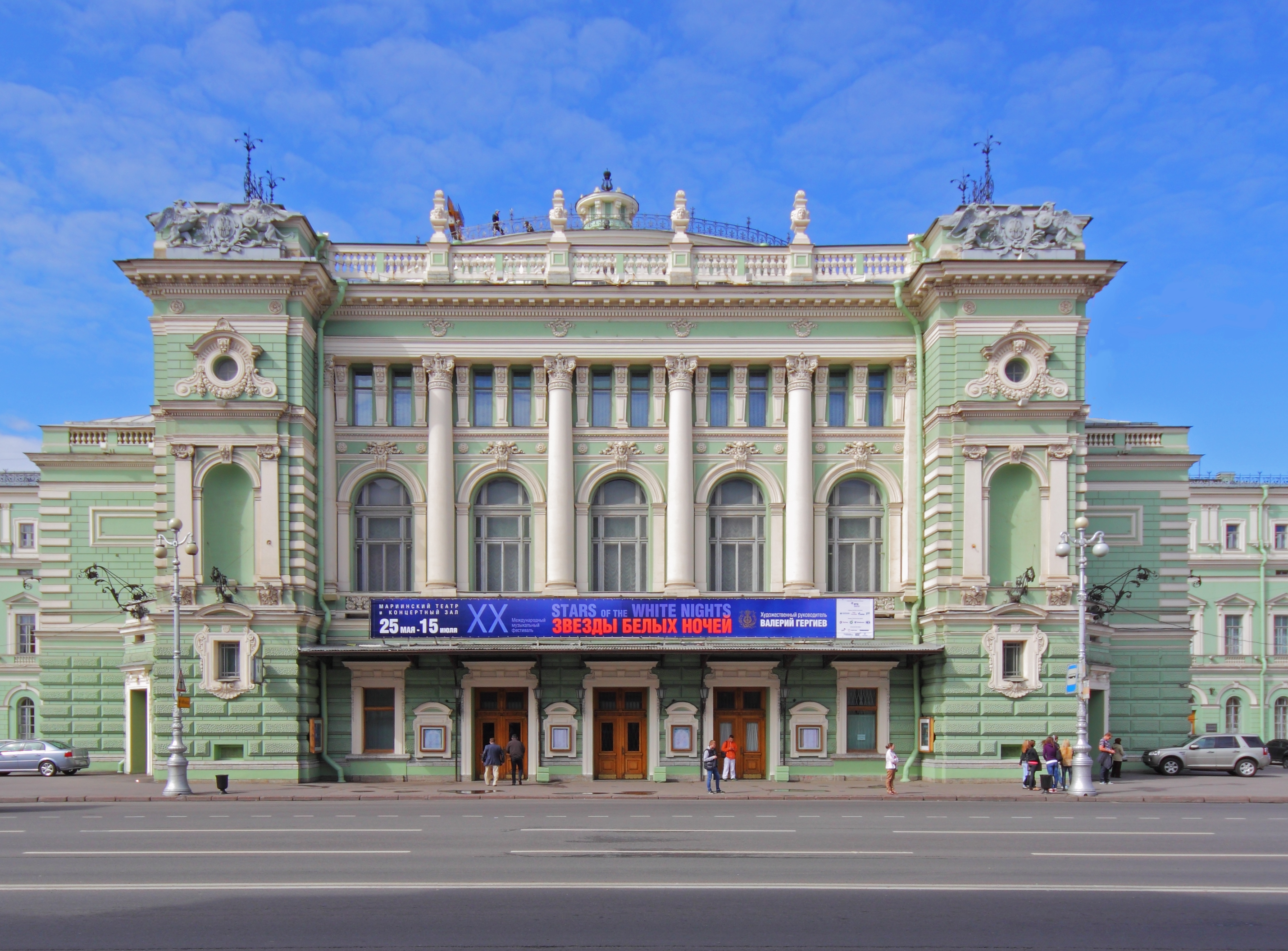
Mariinsky Theatre, Saint Petersburg

- Astrakhan State Theatre of Opera and Ballet, Astrakhan
- Bashkir State Opera and Ballet Theatre, Ufa
- Bolshoi Theatre, Moscow
- Buryat Academic Opera and Ballet Theatre, Ulan-Ude
- The Chelyabinsk state academic opera and ballet theatre of M.I.Glinka, Chelyabinsk
- Chuvash State Opera and Ballet Theater, Cheboksary
- Ekaterinburg Opera and Ballet Theatre, Ekaterinburg
- Galina Vishnevskaya Opera Centre, Moscow
- Helikon Opera, Moscow
- Krasnoyarsk Opera and Ballet Theatre, Krasnoyarsk
- Magnitogorsk Opera and Ballet Theatre, Magnitogorsk
- Mariinsky Theatre, Saint Petersburg
- Mikhaylovsky Theatre, Saint Petersburg
- Moscow Operetta Theatre, Moscow
- Musa Calil Tatar State Academic Opera and Ballet Theatre, Kazan
- Natalya Sats Musical Theater, Moscow
- Novaya Opera Theatre, Moscow
- Novosibirsk Opera and Ballet Theatre, Novosibirsk
- Pokrovsky Moscow State Academic Chamber Musical Theatre, Moscow
- Pushkin Nizhny Novgorod State Academic Opera and Ballet Theatre, Nizhny Novgorod
- Pyotr Illytch Tchaikovsky Perm Academic Opera and Ballet Theatre, Perm
- Republic Sakha – Yakutia State Academic Opera and Ballet Theatre, Yakutsk
- Rostov State Opera and Ballet, Rostov
- Samara State Academic Opera and Ballet Theatre, Samara
- Sapaev Mari State Opera and Ballet Theatre, Yoshkar-Ola
- Saratov Opera and Ballet Theater, Saratov
- St Petersburg Chamber Opera, Saint Petersburg
- Stanislavsky and Nemirovich-Danchenko Moscow Musical Academic Theatre, Moscow
- State Theatre of Opera and Ballet of Udmurt Republic, Izhevsk
- Taganrog Theatre, Taganrog
- Tsaritsynskaya opera, Volgograd
- Voronezh State Academic Opera and Ballet Theatre, Voronezh
- Zazerkalie, Saint Petersburg

=== Serbia ===
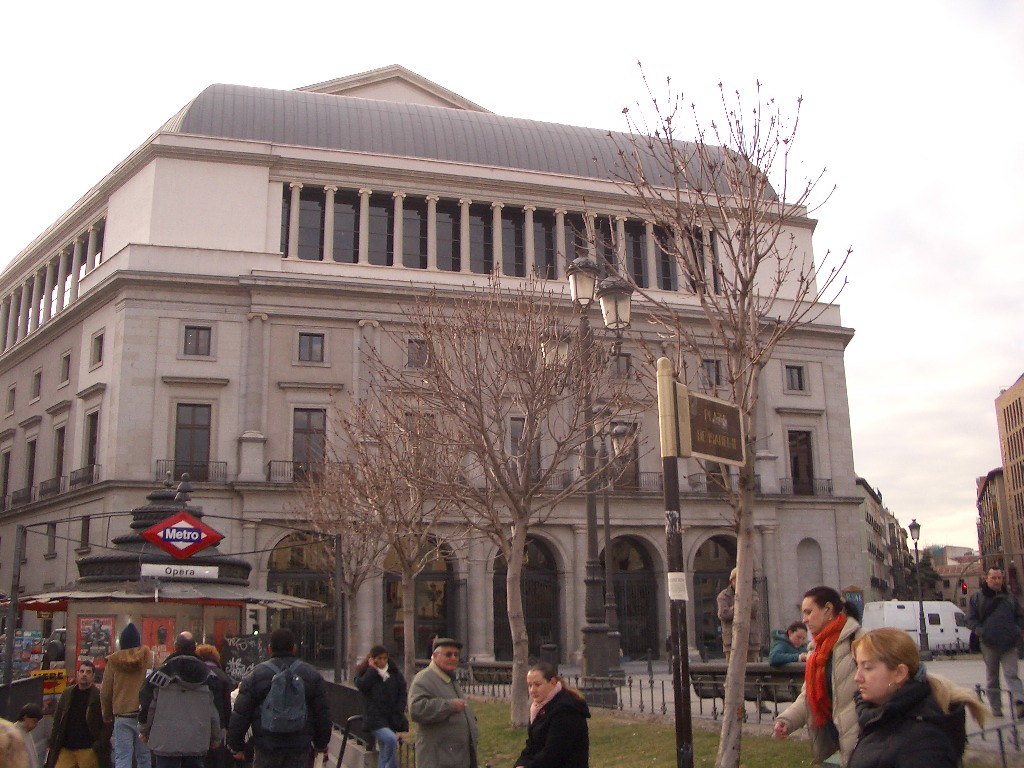
Teatro Real, Madrid

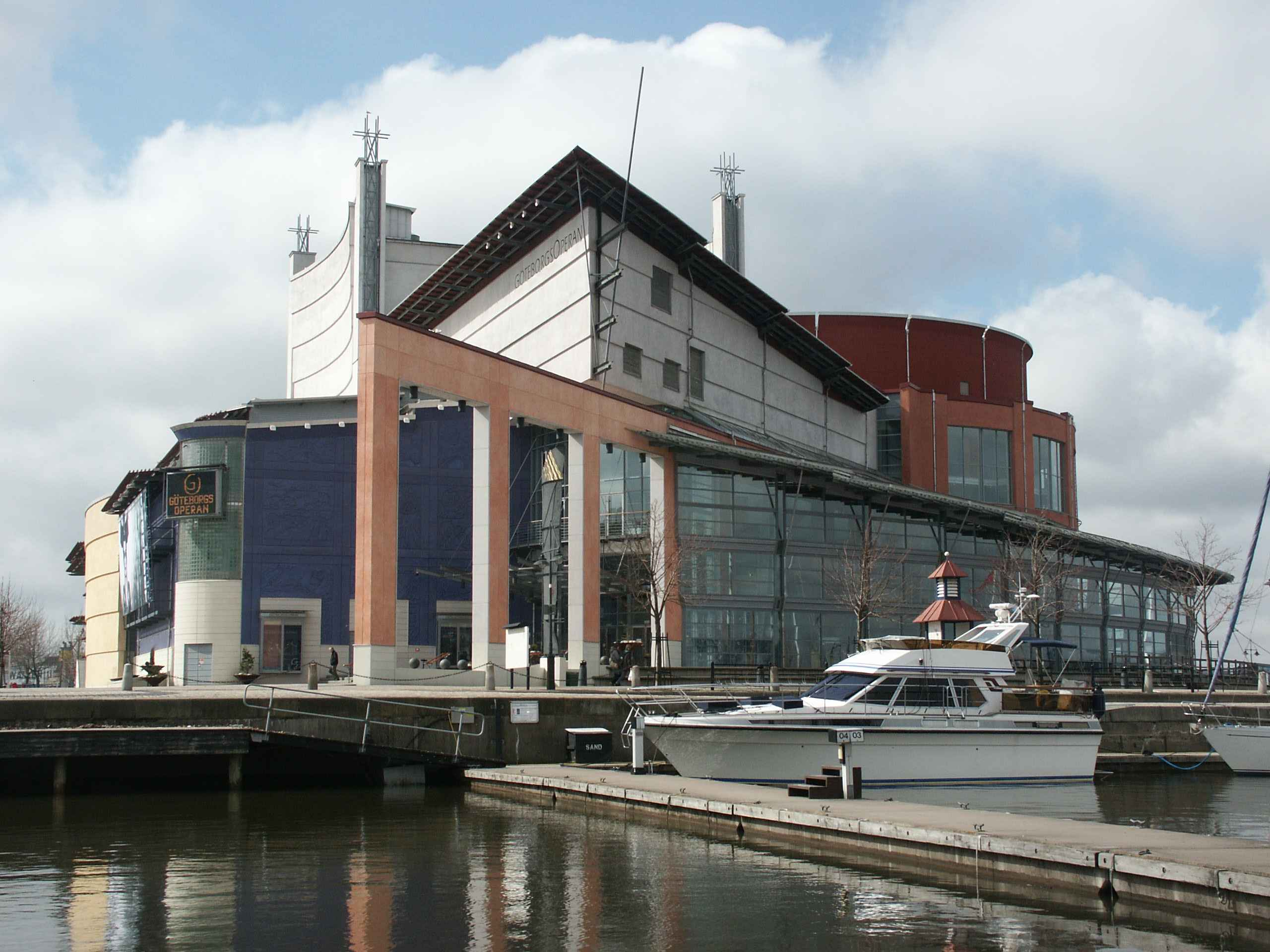
Gothenburg Opera

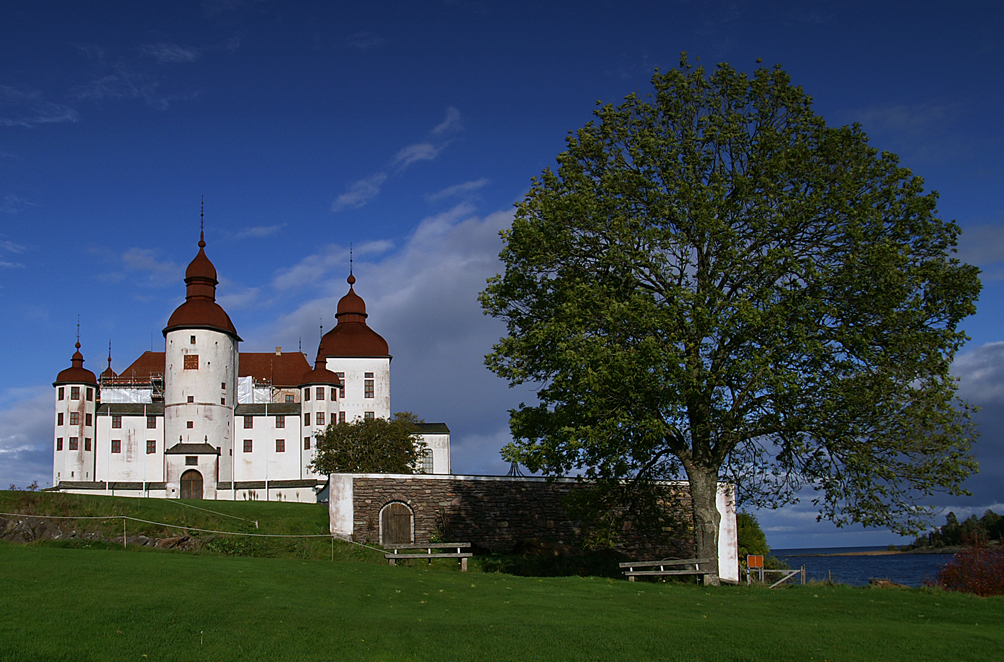
Läckö Castle – venue of the Castle Opera

- Madlenianum Opera and Theatre, Belgrade
- National Theatre in Belgrade, Belgrade
- Serbian National Theatre, Novi Sad

=== Slovakia ===
- Slovak National Theatre, Bratislava
- State Opera in Banská Bystrica, Banská Bystrica
- State Theatre Košice, Košice

=== Slovenia ===
- Ljubljana Opera House, Ljubljana
- SNG Opera balet Maribor, Maribor

=== Spain ===
- Euskalduna Conference Centre and Concert Hall, Bilbao
- Gran Teatre del Liceu, Barcelona
- Kursaal Palace, San Sebastián
- Mozart Hall, Zaragoza
- Palacio de la Ópera, A Coruña
- Palau de les Arts Reina Sofía, Valencia
- Teatro Arriaga, Bilbao
- Teatro Campoamor, Oviedo
- Teatro de la Maestranza, Seville
- Teatro de la Zarzuela, Madrid
- Teatre La Faràndula, Sabadell
- Teatre Principal, Barcelona (now closed)
- Teatre Principal de Maó, Mahón
- Teatro Real, Madrid
- Teatro Pérez Galdós, Las Palmas de Gran Canaria

=== Sweden ===
- Confidencen, Solna (Stockholm)
- Drottningholm Palace Theatre (Drottningholms Slottsteater), Drottningholm (Stockholm)
- Folkoperan, Stockholm
- Gothenburg Opera (GöteborgsOperan), Gothenburg
- Läckö Castle Opera, Lidköping
- Malmö Opera (Malmö Opera), Malmö
- Norrland Opera, Umeå
- Royal Swedish Opera (Kungliga Operan), Stockholm
- Vadstena Academy, Vadstena
- Wermland Opera, Karlstad

=== Switzerland ===
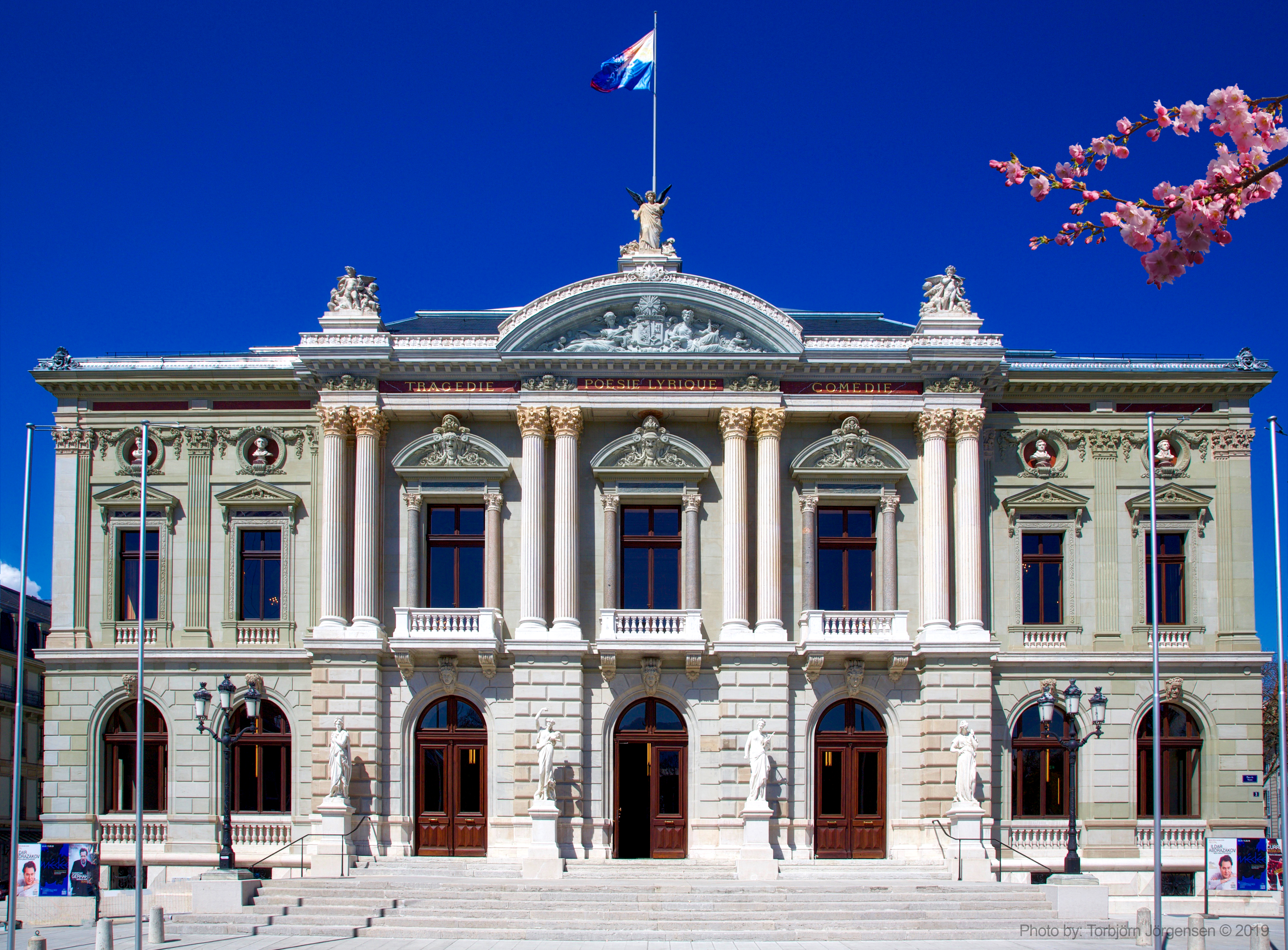
Grand Théâtre, Geneva

- Bühnen Bern (Stadttheater Bern), Bern
- Grand Théâtre de Genève, Geneva
- Lausanne Opera, Lausanne
- Opernhaus Zürich, Zürich
- Luzerner Theater (Stadttheater Luzern), Lucerne
- Theater Basel, Basel
- Theater Biel-Solothurn, Biel/Bienne–Solothurn
- Theater St. Gallen, St. Gallen

=== Ukraine ===
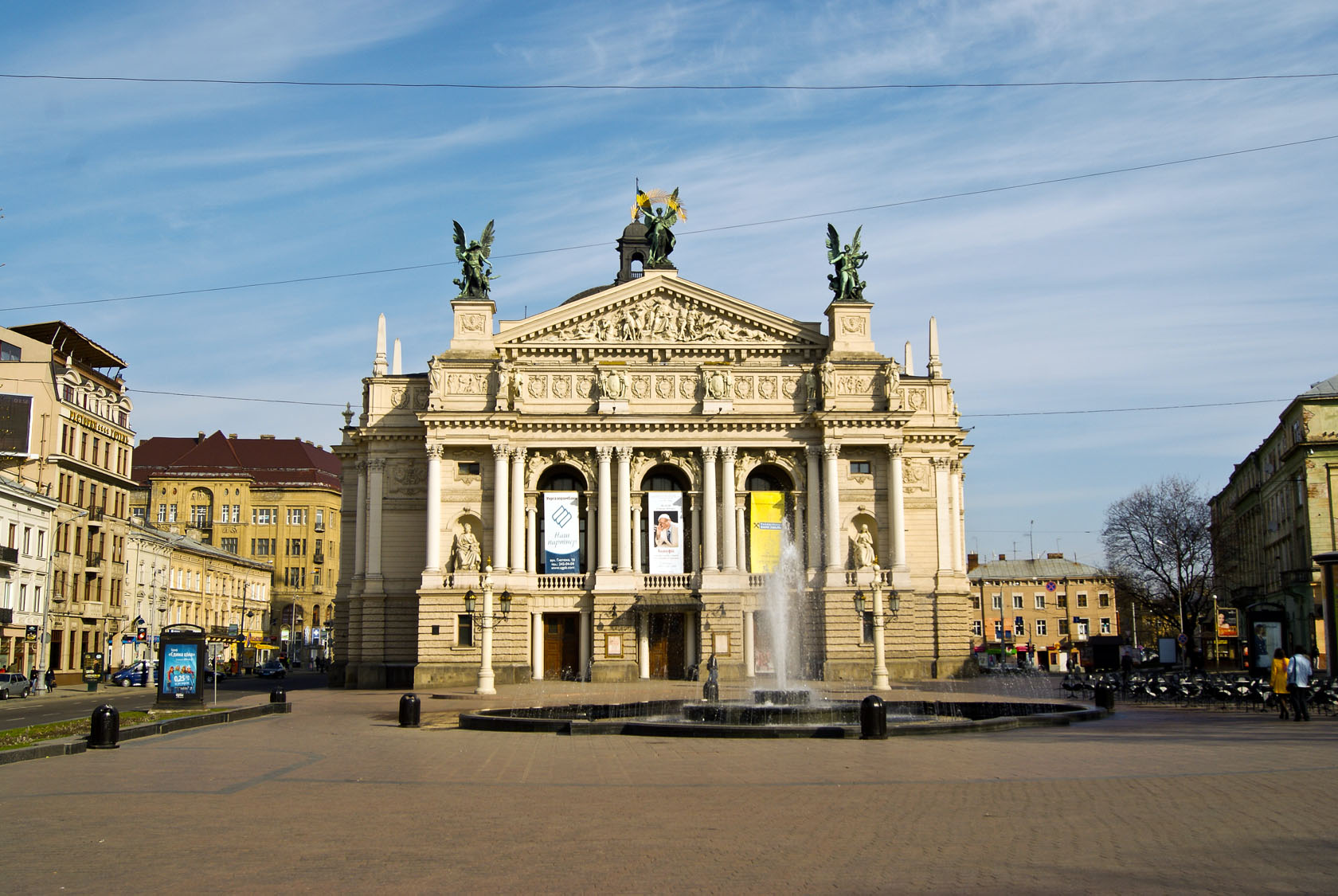
Lviv Opera Theater

- Chernivtsi Opera House, Chernivtsi
- Dnipro Opera, Dnipro
- Donetsk Opera, Donetsk
- Kharkiv Opera, Kharkiv
- National Opera of Ukraine, Kyiv
- Lviv Theatre of Opera and Ballet (Lviv National Academic Theatre of Opera and Ballet), Lviv
- October Palace, Kyiv
- Odesa Opera and Ballet Theater, Odesa

=== United Kingdom and Dependencies ===
==== England ====
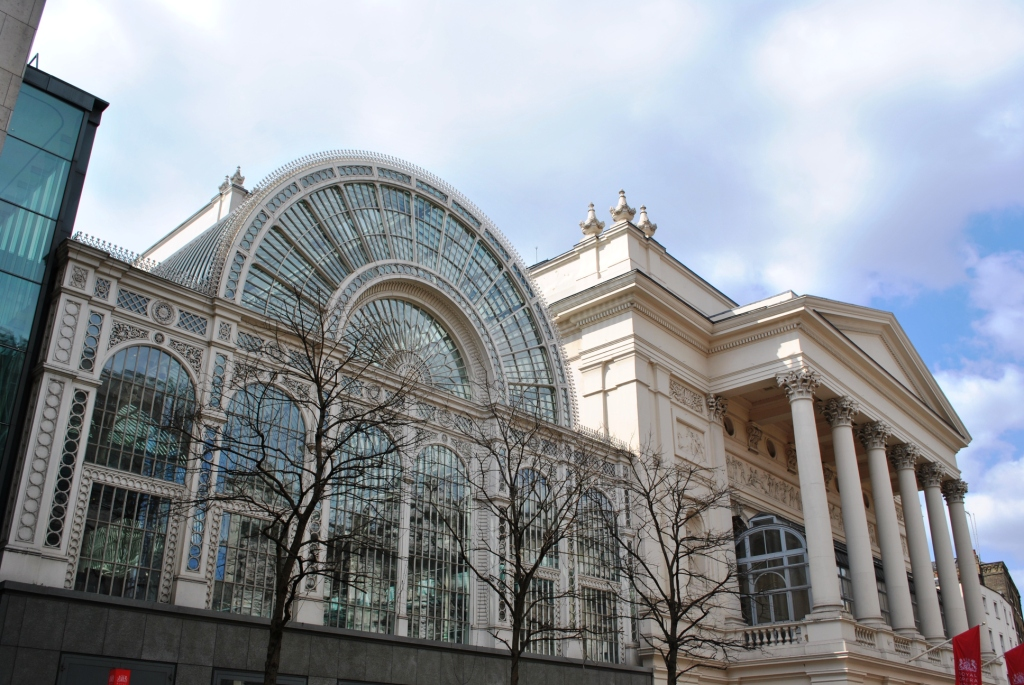
Royal Opera House, London

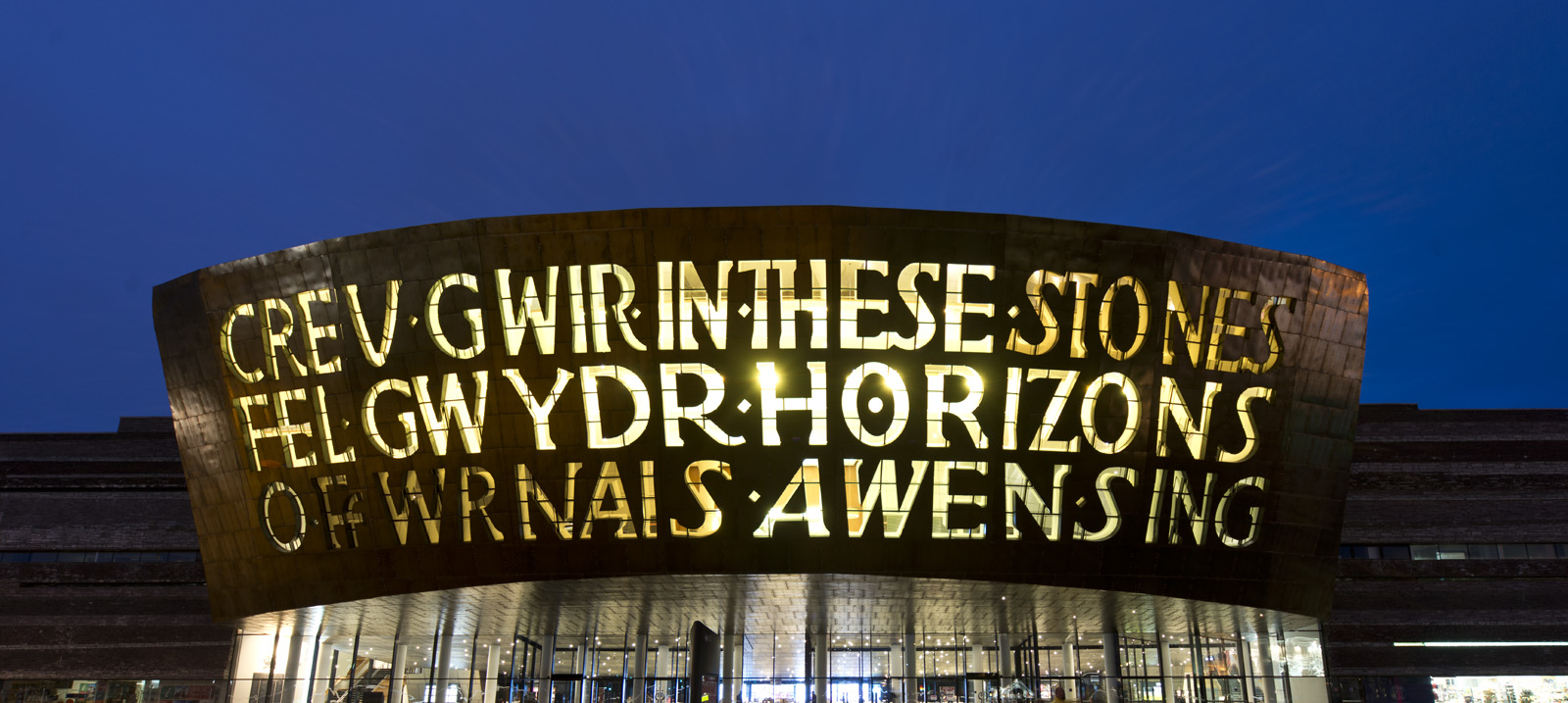
Wales Millennium Centre

- Opera House, Buxton
- English National Opera, London
- Garsington Opera, Buckinghamshire
- Glyndebourne, East Sussex
- Grand Opera House, York
- The Grange Festival, Northington, Hampshire
- Grange Park Opera, Horsley, Surrey
- Lowry Centre, Salford
- Opera House, Manchester
- Royal Opera House, Covent Garden, London
- Sadler's Wells (Sadler's Wells Theatre), London
- Tyne Theatre & Opera House, Newcastle upon Tyne
- Wakefield Opera House (became cinema 1920s), Wakefield

==== Northern Ireland ====
- Grand Opera House, Belfast

==== Scotland ====
- Edinburgh Festival Theatre (Festival Theatre), Edinburgh
- Music Hall & Opera House (remodelled 1889 as Assembly Rooms), Dundee
- Theatre Royal, Glasgow (Scottish Opera), Glasgow

==== Wales ====
- Canolfan Mileniwm Cymru (Wales Millennium Centre), Cardiff
- Craig-y-Nos Castle, Powys, Wales

==== Isle of Man ====
- Gaiety Theatre and Opera House, Douglas

==== Jersey ====
- Jersey Opera House, Saint Helier, Jersey

== Americas ==
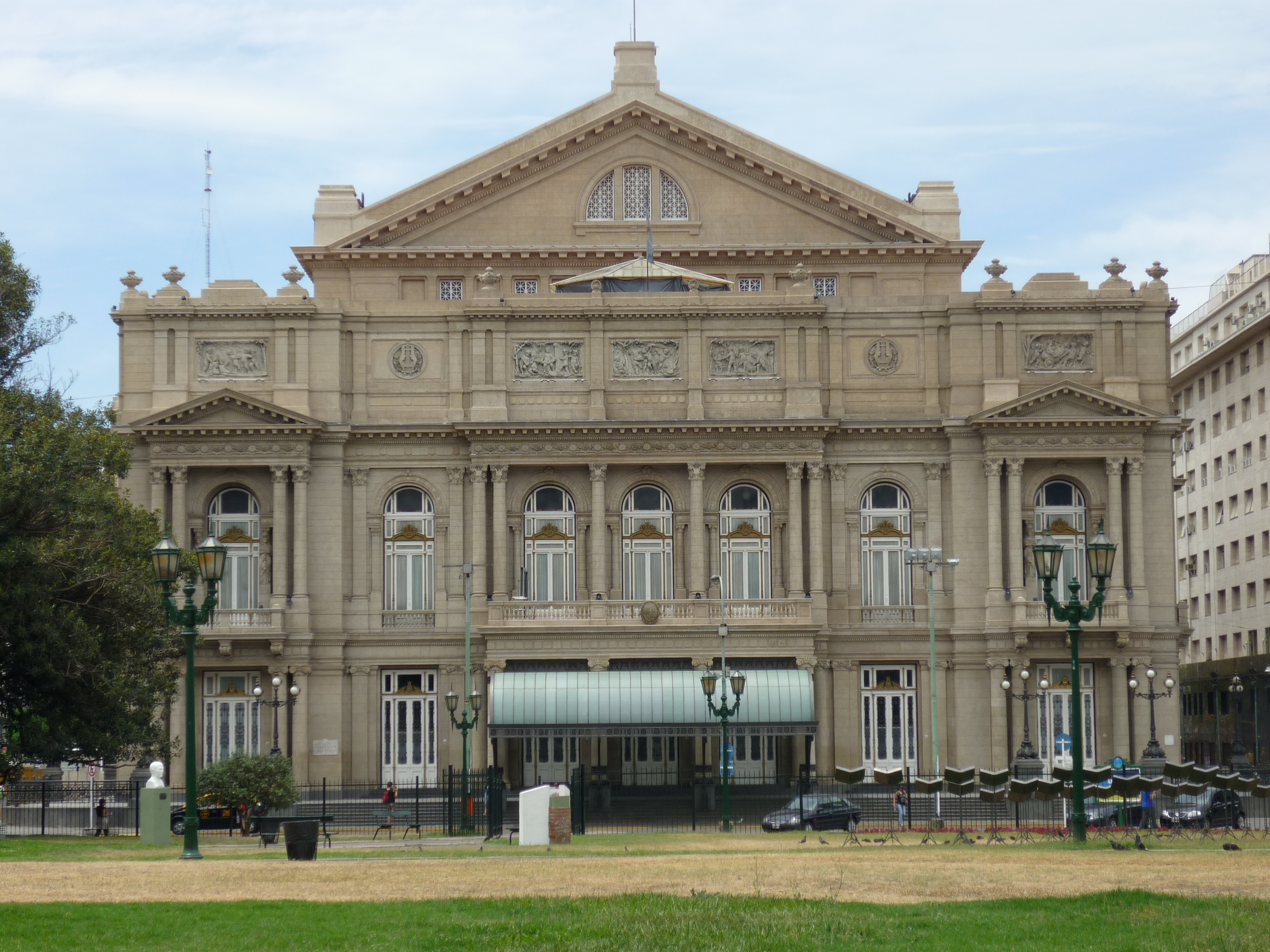
Teatro Colón, Buenos Aires, Argentina

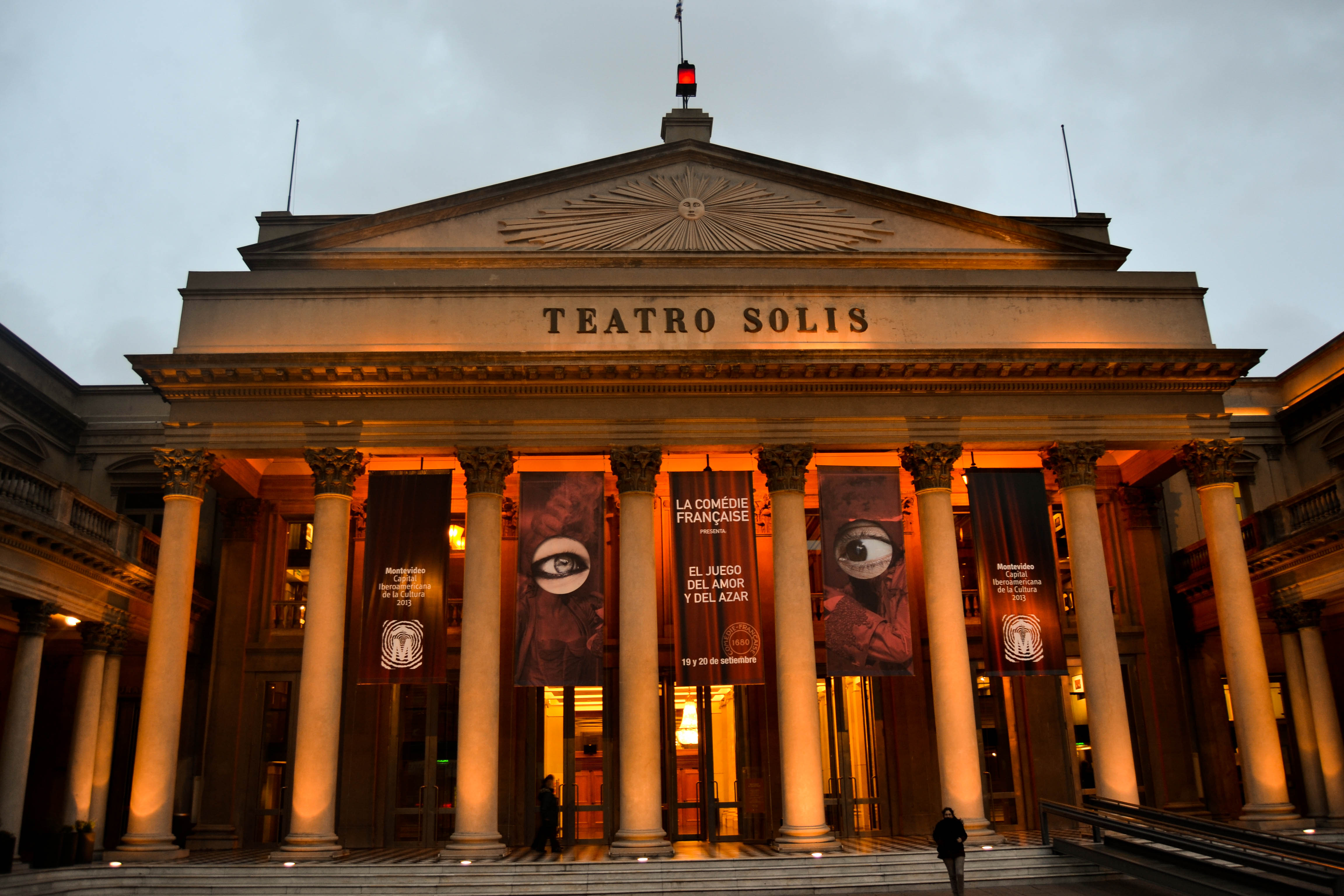
Teatro Solís, Montevideo, Uruguay

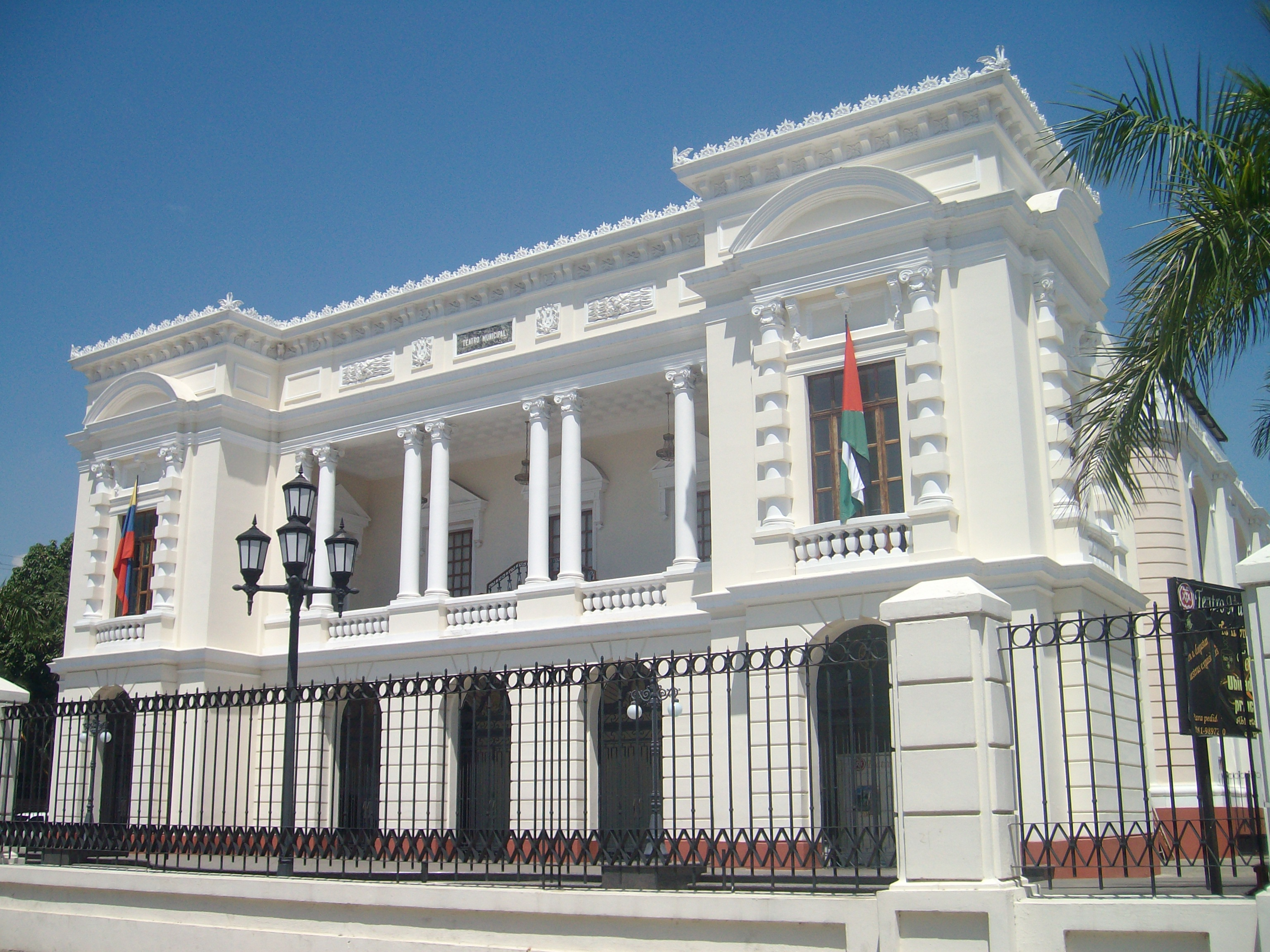
Teatro Municipal de Valencia, Venezuela

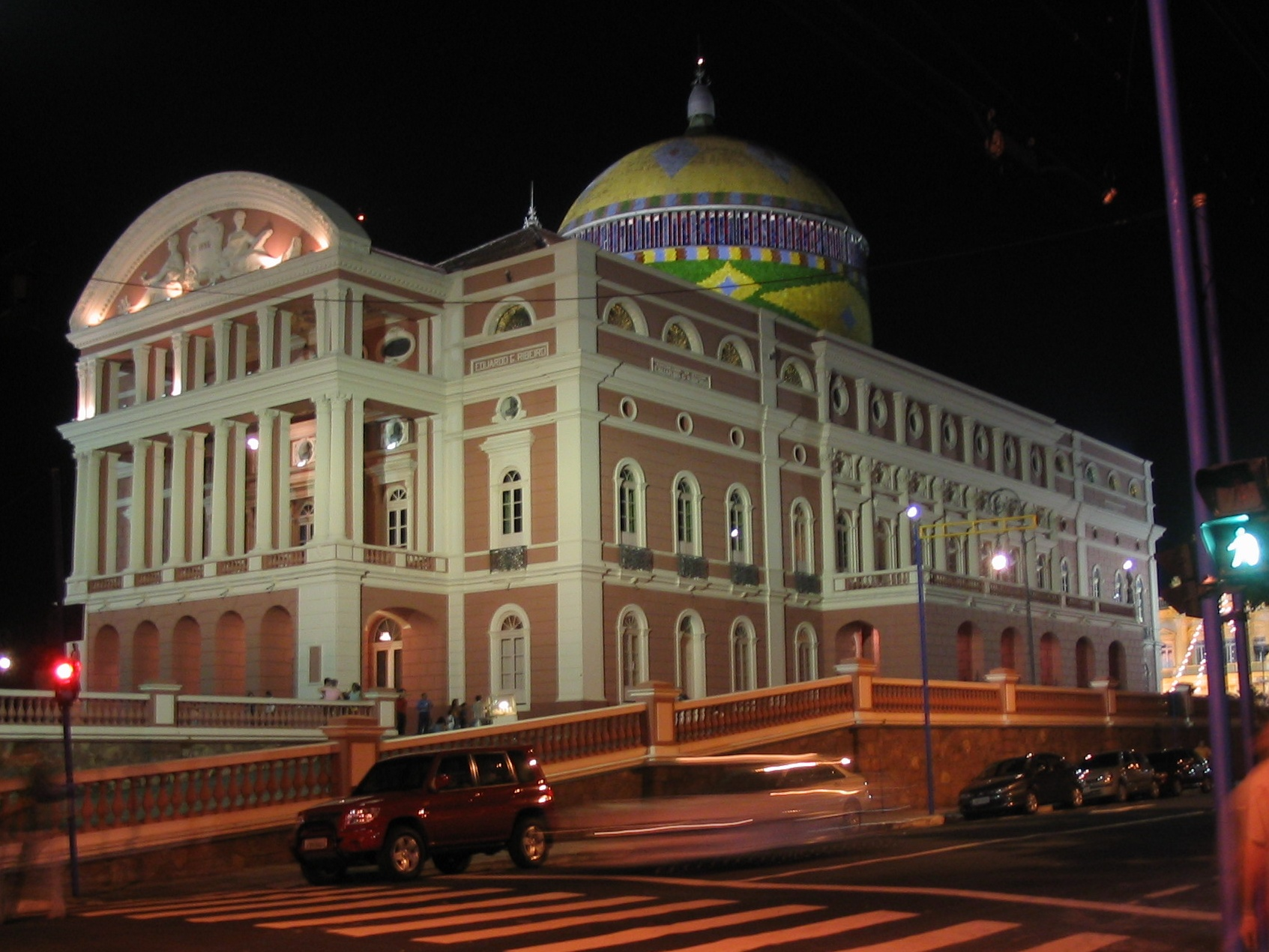
Teatro Amazonas, Manaus, Brazil

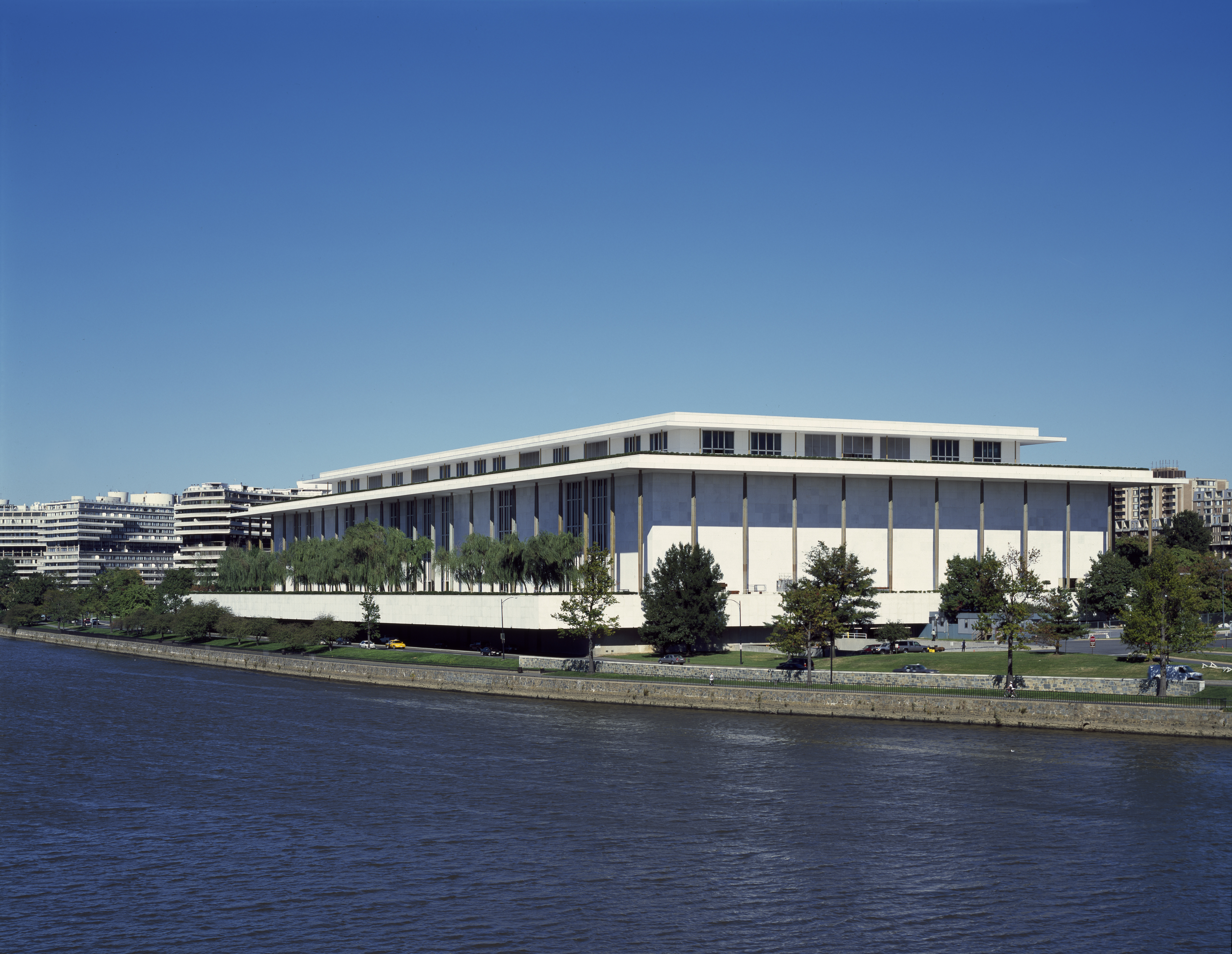
The Kennedy Center, Washington, D.C., USA

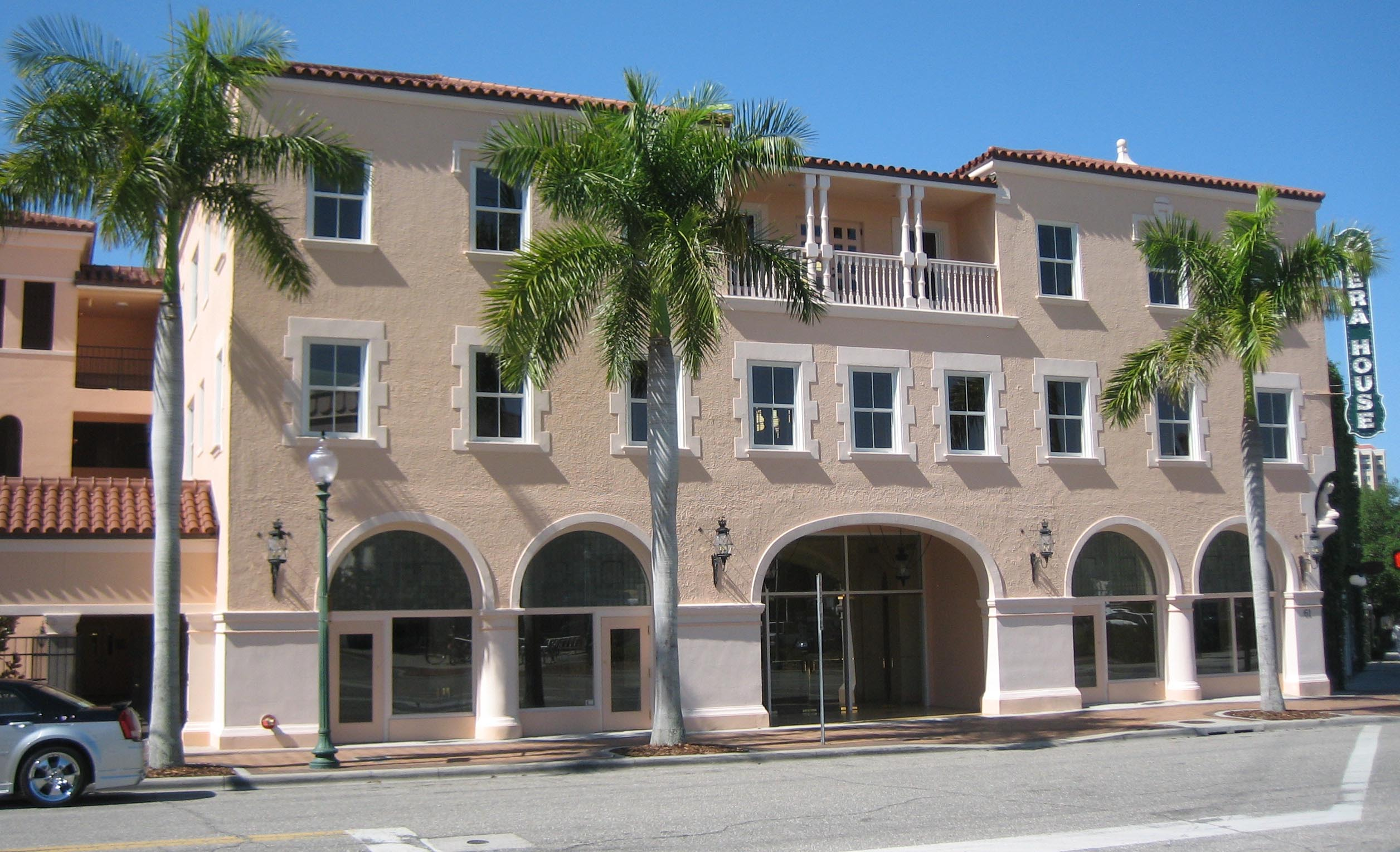
Sarasota Opera House, USA

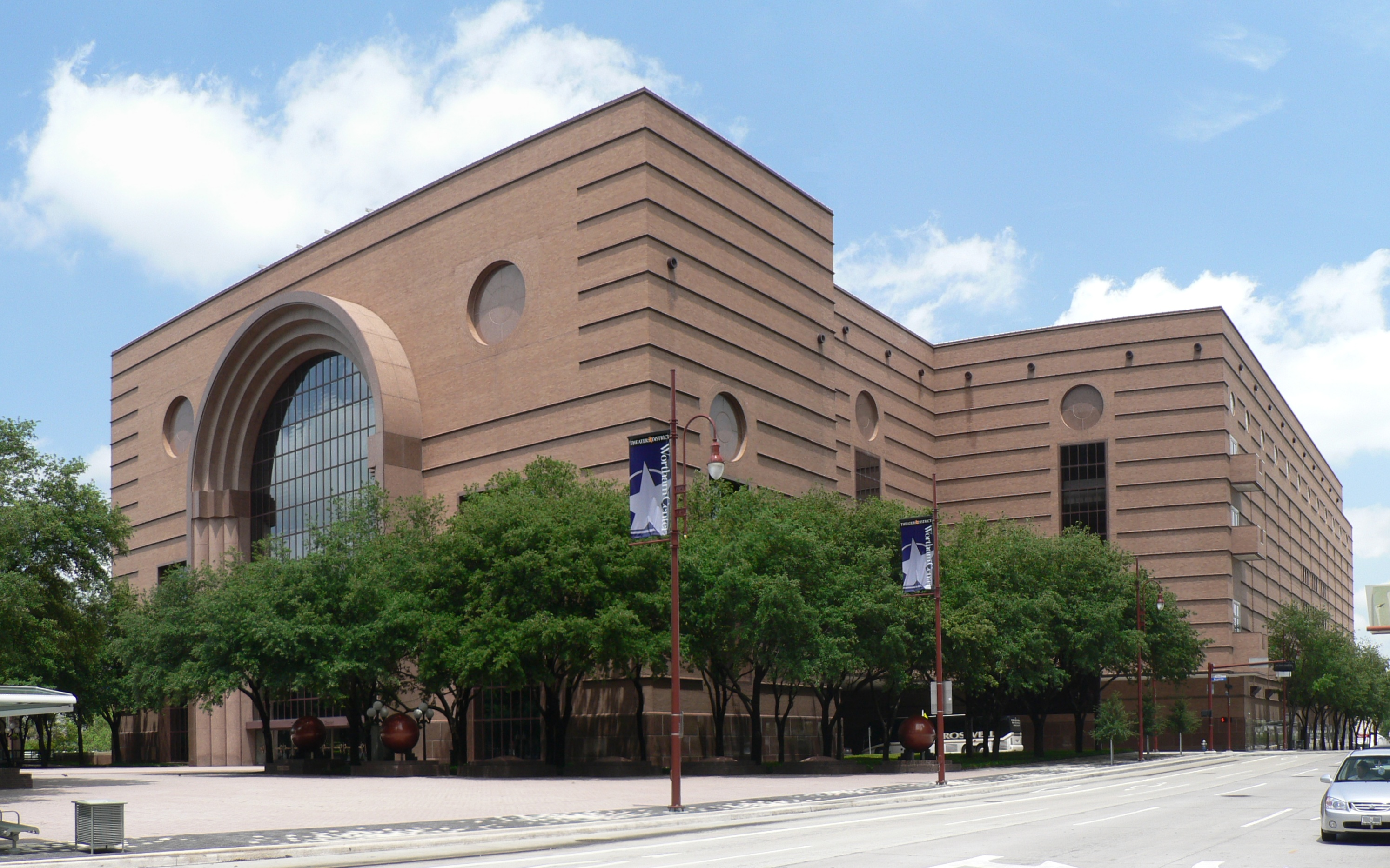
Wortham Center, Houston, Texas

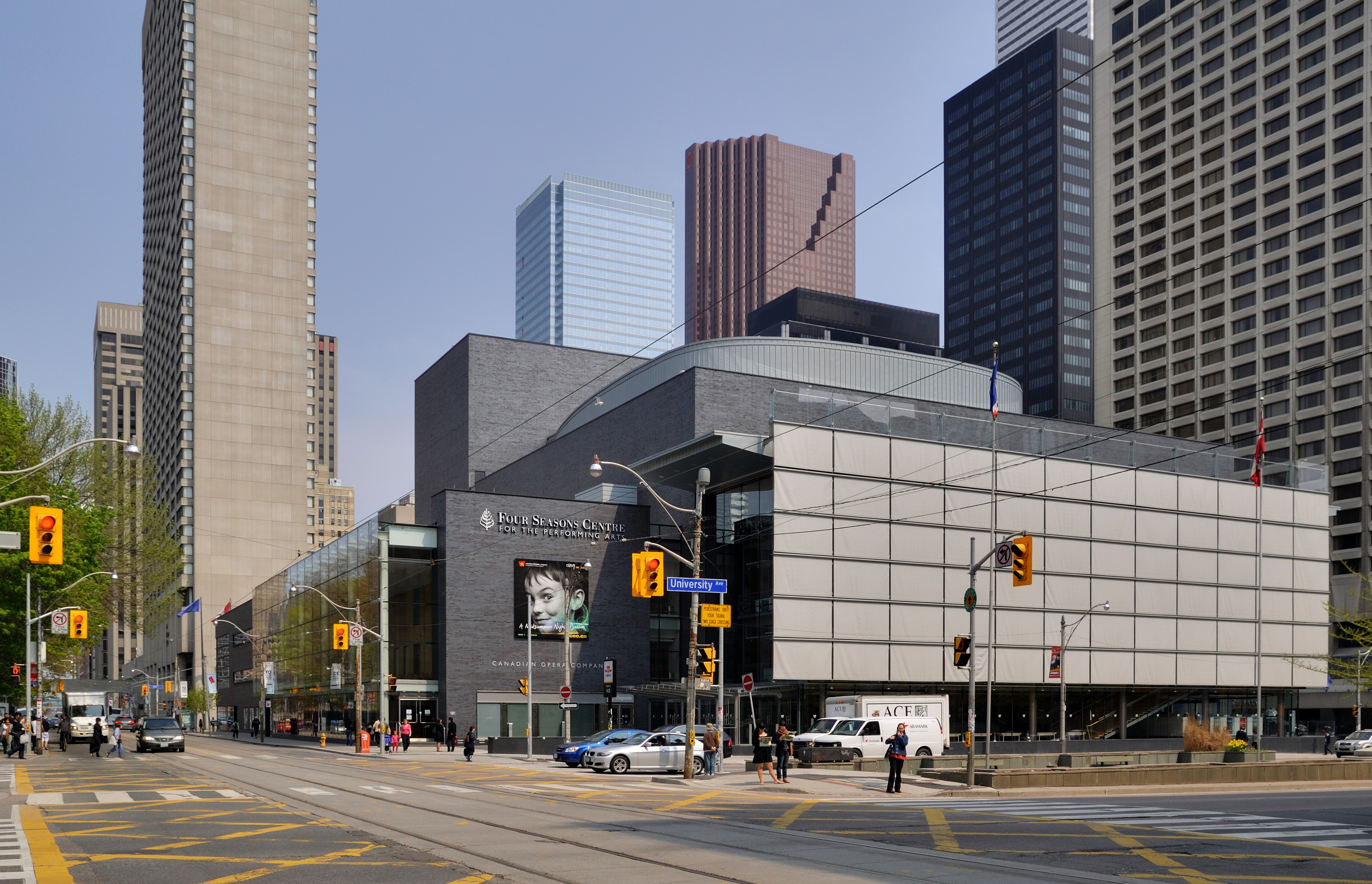
Four Seasons Centre, Toronto, Ontario, Canada

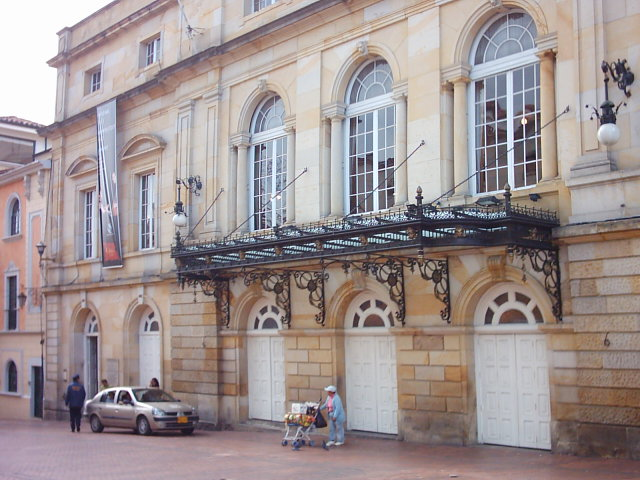
Teatro de Cristóbal Colón, Bogotá, Colombia

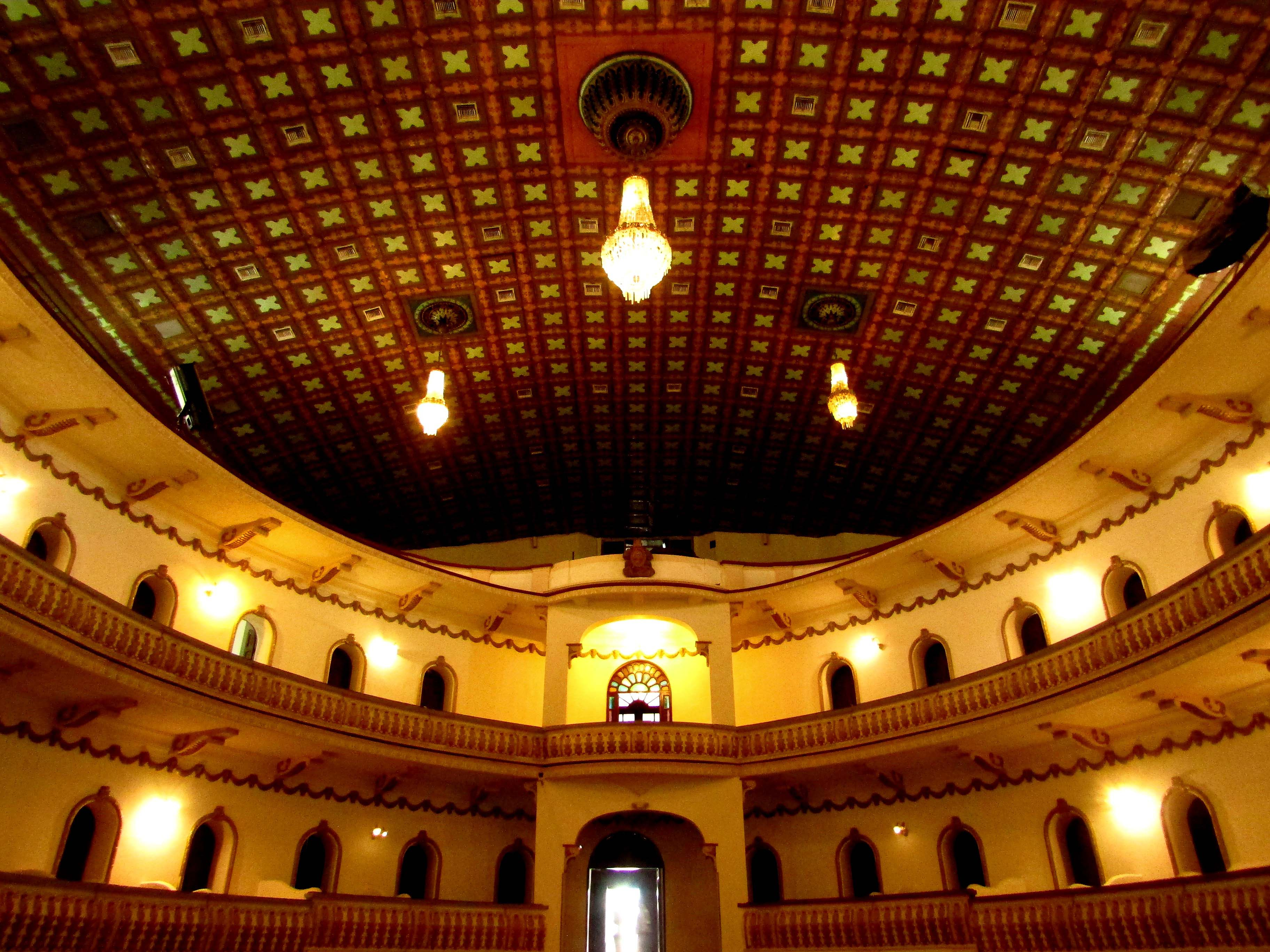
Interior of the Teatro Nacional Manuel Bonilla, Tegucigalpa, Honduras

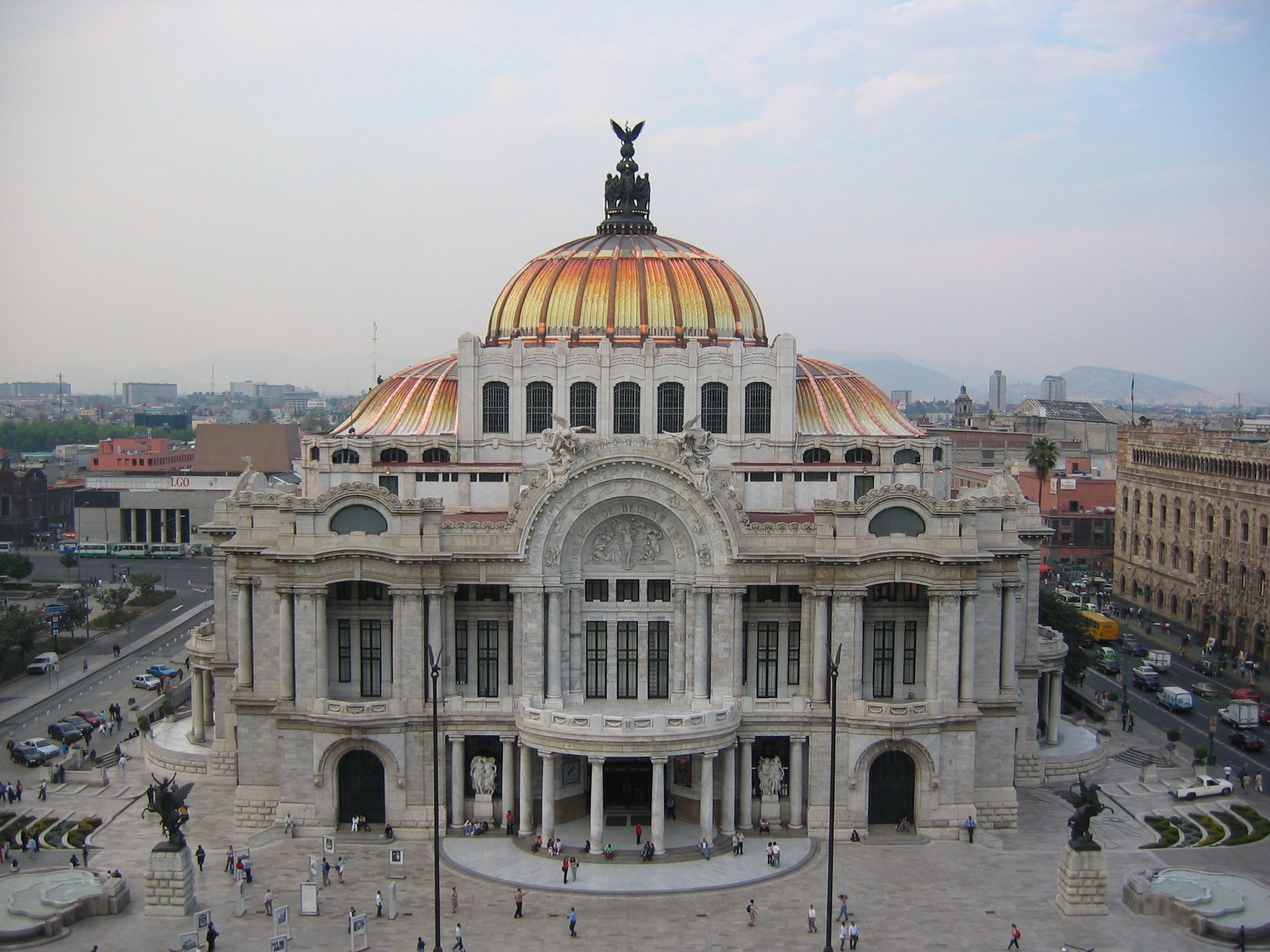
Palacio de Bellas Artes, Mexico City, Mexico

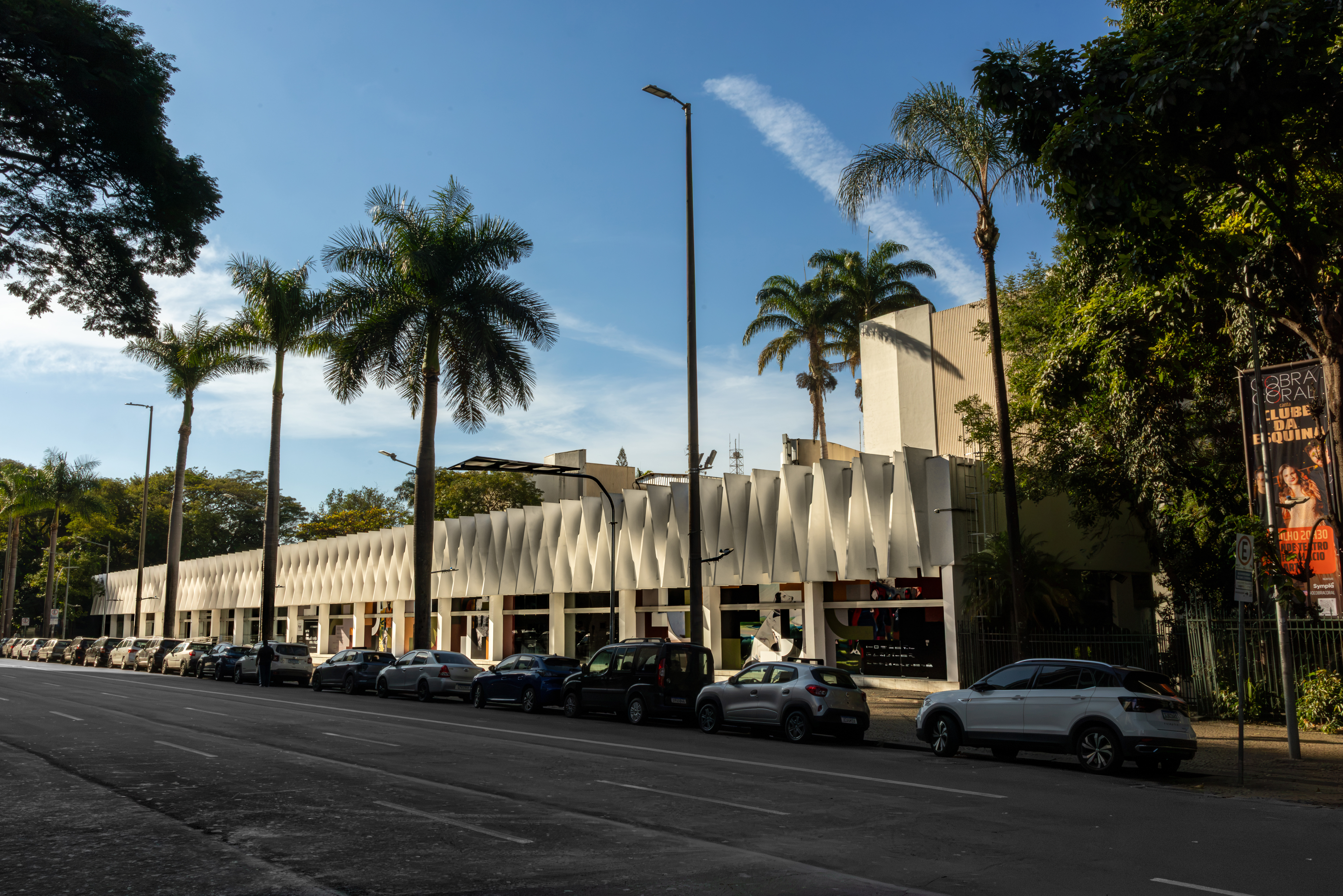
Palácio das Artes, Belo Horizonte, Brazil

=== Argentina ===
- Teatro Independencia, Mendoza
- Teatro del Libertador General San Martín, Córdoba
- Teatro Municipal 1º de Mayo, Santa Fe
- Teatro Alberdi, San Miguel de Tucumán
- Teatro Argentino de La Plata, La Plata
- Teatro Avenida, Buenos Aires
- Teatro Coliseo, Buenos Aires"Teatro Coliseo". Operabase.
- Teatro El Círculo, Rosario
- Teatro Colón, Buenos Aires
- Teatro San Martín, San Miguel de Tucumán
- Teatro del Bicentenario, San Juan"The Teatro del Bicentenario of San Juan presents its 2026 season on the occasion of its 10th anniversary". Ópera Latinoamérica. 31 March 2026.

=== Bolivia ===
- Teatro Municipal Alberto Saavedra Pérez, La Paz"Teatro Municipal Alberto Saavedra Pérez". Directorio de Industrias Culturales y Creativas de América Latina y el Caribe (in Spanish). Latin American and Caribbean Economic System.
- Teatro José María de Achá, Cochabamba"Teatro José María de Achá: 160 años de historia, arte y misterios". Los Tiempos (in Spanish). 25 August 2024.

=== Brazil ===
- Teatro Tobias Barreto, Aracaju
- Theatro da Paz, Belém
- Palácio das Artes, Belo Horizonte
- Teatro Nacional Cláudio Santoro, Brasília
- Teatro Guaíra, Curitiba
- Ópera de Arame, Curitiba
- Teatro Álvaro de Carvalho, Florianópolis
- Theatro José de Alencar, Fortaleza
- Teatro Goiânia, Goiânia
- Teatro Esperança, Jaguarão
- Theatro Santa Roza, João Pessoa
- Cine-Theatro Central, Juiz de Fora
- Teatro Polytheama, Jundiaí
- Teatro Deodoro, Maceió
- Teatro Amazonas, Manaus
- Teatro Alberto Maranhão, Natal
- Theatro Municipal de Niterói, Niterói
- Casa da Ópera (Teatro Municipal de Ouro Preto), Ouro Preto
- Theatro Guarany, Pelotas
- Theatro Sete de Abril, Pelotas
- Teatro Sete de Setembro, Penedo
- Theatro São Pedro, Porto Alegre
- Teatro de Santa Isabel, Recife
- Theatro Pedro II, Ribeirão Preto
- Cidade das Artes, Rio de Janeiro
- Teatro João Caetano, Rio de Janeiro
- Theatro D. Pedro II, Rio de Janeiro (demolished in 1934)
- Theatro Lyrico Fluminense, Rio de Janeiro (demolished in 1875)
- Theatro Municipal, Rio de Janeiro
- Teatro Castro Alves, Salvador
- Teatro Coliseu, Santos
- Teatro Guarany, Santos
- Theatro Municipal, São João da Boa Vista
- Teatro Arthur Azevedo, São Luís
- Teatro Colombo, São Paulo (destroyed in 1966)
- Theatro Municipal, São Paulo
- Theatro São José, São Paulo (demolished in 1924)
- Theatro São Pedro, São Paulo
- Teatro Carlos Gomes, Vitória

=== Canada ===
- Elgin Theatre (Opera Atelier), Toronto, Ontario
- Four Seasons Centre for the Performing Arts (Canadian Opera Company), Toronto, Ontario
- Grand Opera House, London, Ontario (destroyed by fire in 1900)
- Grand Opera House, Toronto, Ontario (demolished in 1927)
- Centennial Concert Hall (Manitoba Opera), Winnipeg, Manitoba
- Northern Alberta Jubilee Auditorium (Edmonton Opera), Edmonton, Alberta
- Queen Elizabeth Theatre (Vancouver Opera), Vancouver, British Columbia
- Royal Theatre (Pacific Opera Victoria), Victoria, British Columbia
- Salle Wilfrid-Pelletier at the Place des Arts (Opéra de Montréal), Montreal, Quebec
- Southam Hall, Ottawa, Ontario
- Southern Alberta Jubilee Auditorium (Calgary Opera), Calgary, Alberta

=== Chile ===
- Teatro Municipal de Santiago, Santiago"Municipal de Santiago". Municipal de Santiago (in Spanish).
- Teatro Municipal de Viña del Mar, Viña del Mar"Teatro Municipal de Viña del Mar lanza temporada 2026 con más de 60 espectáculos". Municipalidad de Viña del Mar (in Spanish).
- Teatro Regional del Maule, Talca"Ópera para todos / Gala lírica inicio de temporada 2026". Teatro Regional del Maule (in Spanish).

=== Colombia ===
- Medellín Metropolitan Theatre, Medellín
- Teatro de Cristóbal Colón, BogotáTeatro Adolfo Mejía (formerly Teatro Heredia), Cartagena"Adolfo Mejía Theatre". Colombia Travel.
- Teatro Jorge Isaacs, Cali
- Teatro Mayor Julio Mario Santo Domingo, Bogotá
- Teatro Municipal Enrique Buenaventura, Cali

=== Costa Rica ===
- Teatro Nacional de Costa Rica, San José

=== Cuba ===
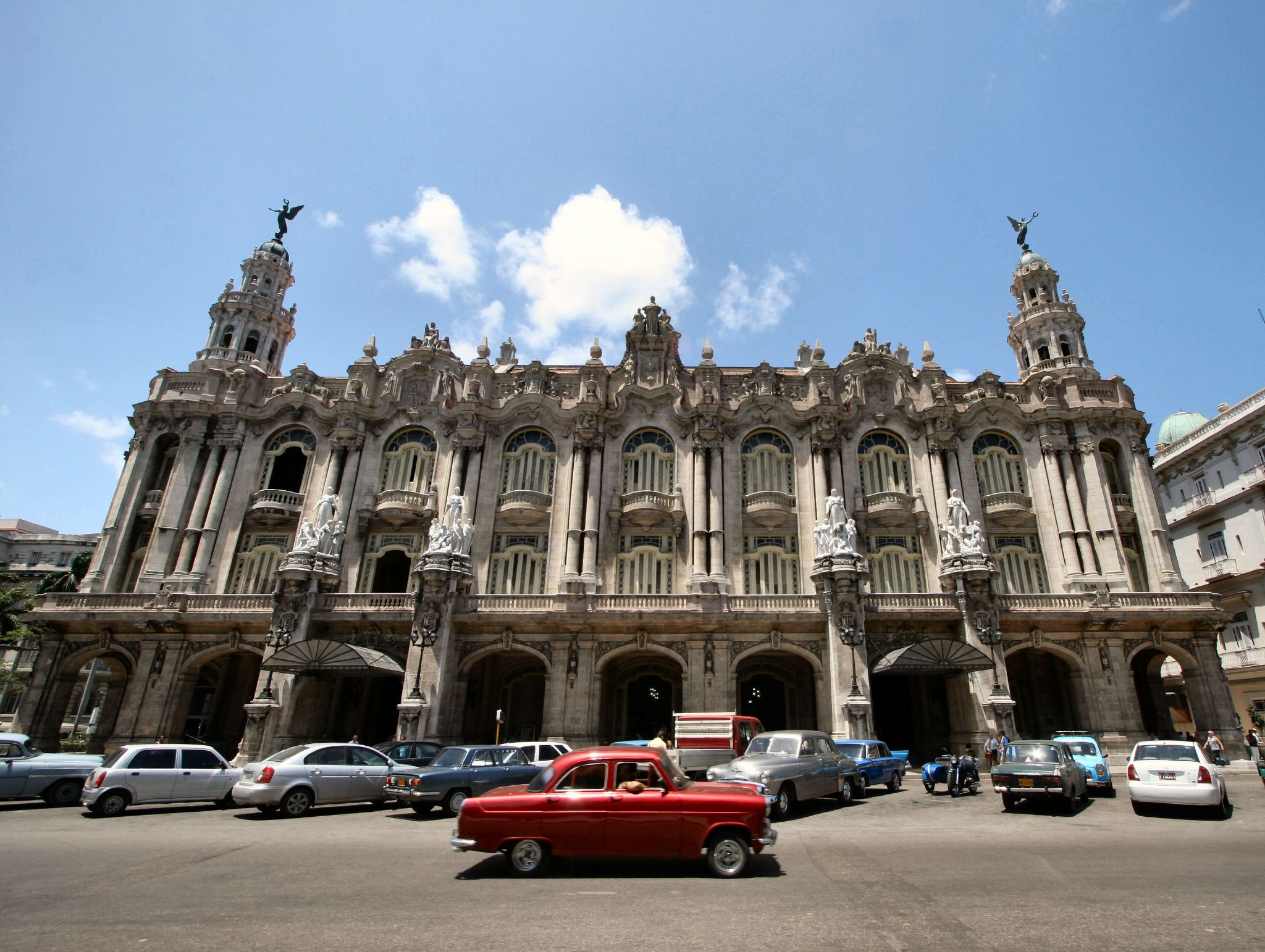
Gran Teatro de La Habana

- Gran Teatro de La Habana Alicia Alonso, Havana
- Teatro Sauto, Matanzas

=== Dominican Republic ===
- Gran Teatro del Cibao, Santiago de los Caballeros
- Eduardo Brito National Theater, Santo Domingo

=== El Salvador ===
- Teatro Nacional de El Salvador, San Salvador

=== Honduras ===
- Teatro Nacional Manuel Bonilla, Tegucigalpa

=== Mexico ===
- Palacio de Bellas Artes, Mexico City
- Teatro Aguascalientes, Aguascalientes
- Teatro Degollado, Guadalajara
- Teatro del Bicentenario Roberto Plasencia Saldaña, León"Teatro del Bicentenario Roberto Plasencia Saldaña". Ópera Latinoamérica (in Spanish).
- Teatro José Peón Contreras, Mérida

=== Peru ===
- Gran Teatro Nacional del Perú, Lima
- Teatro Manuel Ascencio Segura, Lima

=== United States ===
- Abraham Chavez Theatre (El Paso Opera), El Paso, Texas
- Academy of Music (Opera Philadelphia), Philadelphia, Pennsylvania
- Bass Performance Hall (Fort Worth Opera), Fort Worth, Texas
- Benedum Center (Pittsburgh Opera), Pittsburgh, Pennsylvania
- Boston Opera House (1909), Boston, Massachusetts
- Citizens Opera House (home of the Opera Company of Boston from 1980 to 1990), Boston, Massachusetts
- Brown Theater at the Wortham Theater Center (Houston Grand Opera), Houston, Texas
- Brown Theatre (Kentucky Opera), Louisville, Kentucky
- California Theatre (Opera San José), San Jose, California
- Carpenter Theatre at the Dominion Energy Center (Virginia Opera), Richmond, Virginia
- Janet Quinney Lawson Capitol Theatre (Utah Opera), Salt Lake City, Utah
- Central City Opera House (Central City Opera), Central City, Colorado
- Civic Opera House (Lyric Opera of Chicago), Chicago, Illinois
- Clowes Memorial Hall (former Indianapolis Opera venue), Indianapolis, Indiana
- Cobb Energy Performing Arts Centre (Atlanta Opera), Atlanta, Georgia
- Crosby Theatre (Santa Fe Opera), Santa Fe, New Mexico
- David H. Koch Theater (formerly the New York State Theater and a former New York City Opera venue), New York City
- Detroit Opera House (Detroit Opera), Detroit, Michigan
- Dicapo Opera Theatre, New York City (closed in 2013)
- Dorothy Chandler Pavilion (Los Angeles Opera), Los Angeles, California
- Duchamp Opera House, St. Martinville, Louisiana
- Ellie Caulkins Opera House (Opera Colorado), Denver, Colorado
- French Opera House, New Orleans, Louisiana
- Harrison Opera House (Virginia Opera), Norfolk, Virginia
- Howard Gilman Opera House at the Brooklyn Academy of Music, Brooklyn, New York
- Howell Opera House, Howell, Michigan
- Opera House at the Kennedy Center (Washington National Opera), Washington, D.C.
- Keller Auditorium (Portland Opera), Portland, Oregon
- Dreyfoos Hall at the Kravis Center for the Performing Arts (Palm Beach Opera), West Palm Beach, Florida
- Loretto-Hilton Center for the Performing Arts (Opera Theatre of Saint Louis), Webster Groves, Missouri
- Lyric Baltimore (former home of the Baltimore Opera Company), Baltimore, Maryland
- Mahalia Jackson Theater of the Performing Arts (New Orleans Opera Association), New Orleans, Louisiana
- Uihlein Hall at the Marcus Performing Arts Center (Florentine Opera), Milwaukee, Wisconsin
- McCaw Hall (Seattle Opera), Seattle, Washington
- Metropolitan Opera House (39th Street), New York City (demolished in 1967)
- Metropolitan Opera House (Metropolitan Opera), New York City
- Metropolitan Opera House (Philadelphia), Philadelphia, Pennsylvania
- Moores Opera House at the University of Houston (Moores School of Music), Houston, Texas
- Music Hall (Cincinnati Opera), Cincinnati, Ohio
- Muriel Kauffman Theatre at the Kauffman Center for the Performing Arts (Lyric Opera of Kansas City), Kansas City, Missouri
- Newberry Opera House, Newberry, South Carolina
- Ordway Center for the Performing Arts (Minnesota Opera), Saint Paul, Minnesota
- Plaza Theatre, El Paso, Texas
- Pote Theatre at the Blank Performing Arts Center (Des Moines Metro Opera), Indianola, Iowa
- Rapides Opera House, Alexandria, Louisiana
- Reynolds Hall at the Smith Center for the Performing Arts, Las Vegas, Nevada
- River Center Theatre for Performing Arts (Opéra Louisiane), Baton Rouge, Louisiana
- RiverView Theater (Shreveport Opera), Shreveport, Louisiana
- San Diego Civic Theatre (San Diego Opera), San Diego, California
- Sarasota Opera House (Sarasota Opera), Sarasota, Florida
- Segerstrom Hall (former home of Opera Pacific), Costa Mesa, California
- Springer Opera House, Columbus, Georgia
- Stifel Theatre (formerly Peabody Opera House), St. Louis, Missouri
- Andrew Jackson Hall at the Tennessee Performing Arts Center (Nashville Opera), Nashville, Tennessee
- Theatre de la Renaissance, New Orleans, Louisiana
- Theatre de la Rue Saint Pierre, New Orleans, Louisiana
- Théâtre d'Orléans, New Orleans, Louisiana
- Chapman Music Hall at the Tulsa Performing Arts Center (Tulsa Opera), Tulsa, Oklahoma
- War Memorial Opera House (San Francisco Opera), San Francisco, California
- Winspear Opera House (Dallas Opera), Dallas, Texas
- Ziff Ballet Opera House at the Adrienne Arsht Center (Florida Grand Opera), Miami, Florida

=== Uruguay ===
- Auditorio Nacional del Sodre Dra. Adela Reta, Montevideo
- Teatro Solís, Montevideo

=== Venezuela ===
- Teresa Carreño Cultural Complex, Caracas
- Teatro de la Ópera de Maracay, Maracay
- Teatro Municipal de Caracas, Caracas
- Baralt Theatre, Maracaibo
- Teatro Municipal de Valencia, Valencia

== Oceania ==
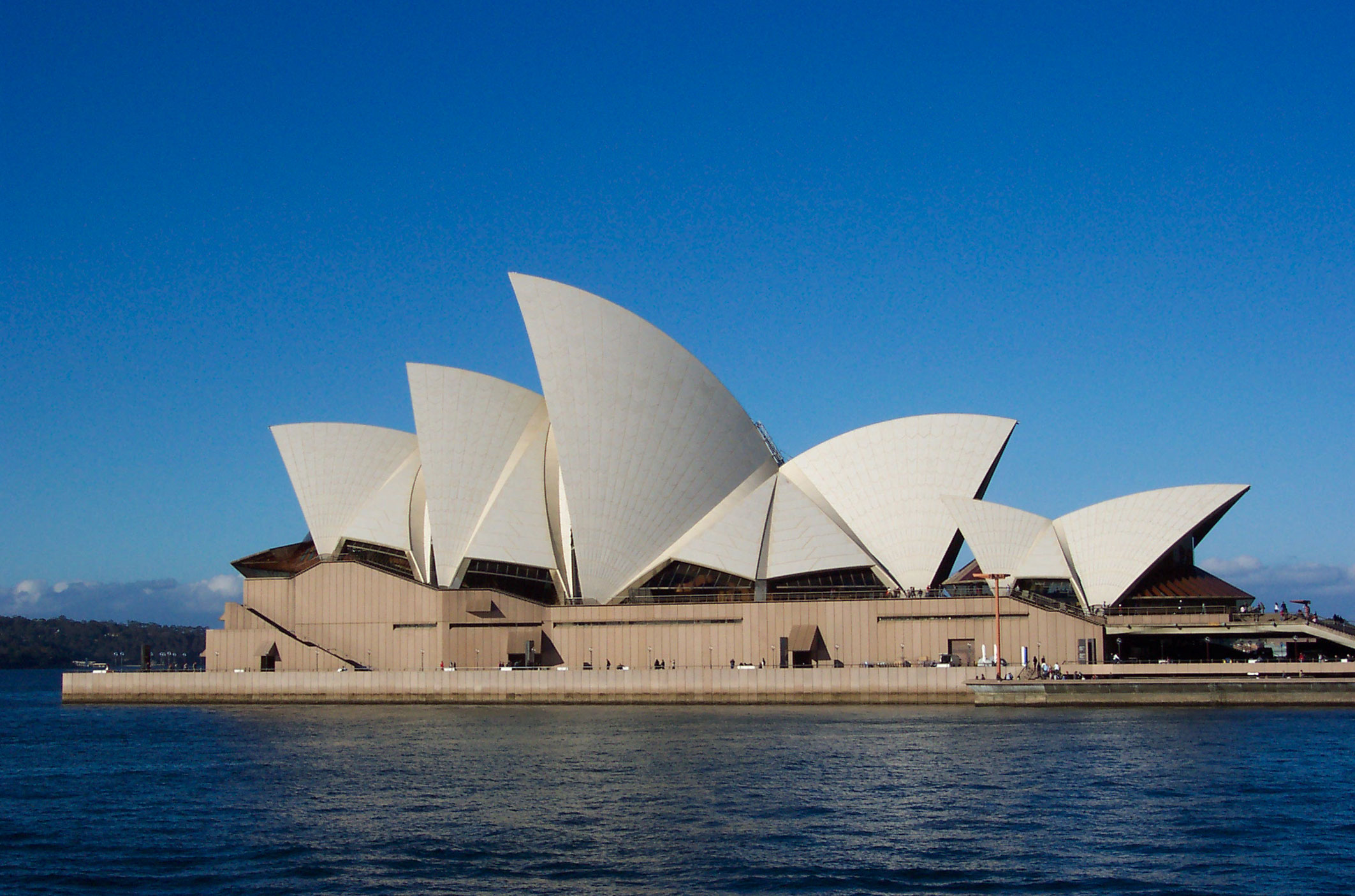
The Sydney Opera House

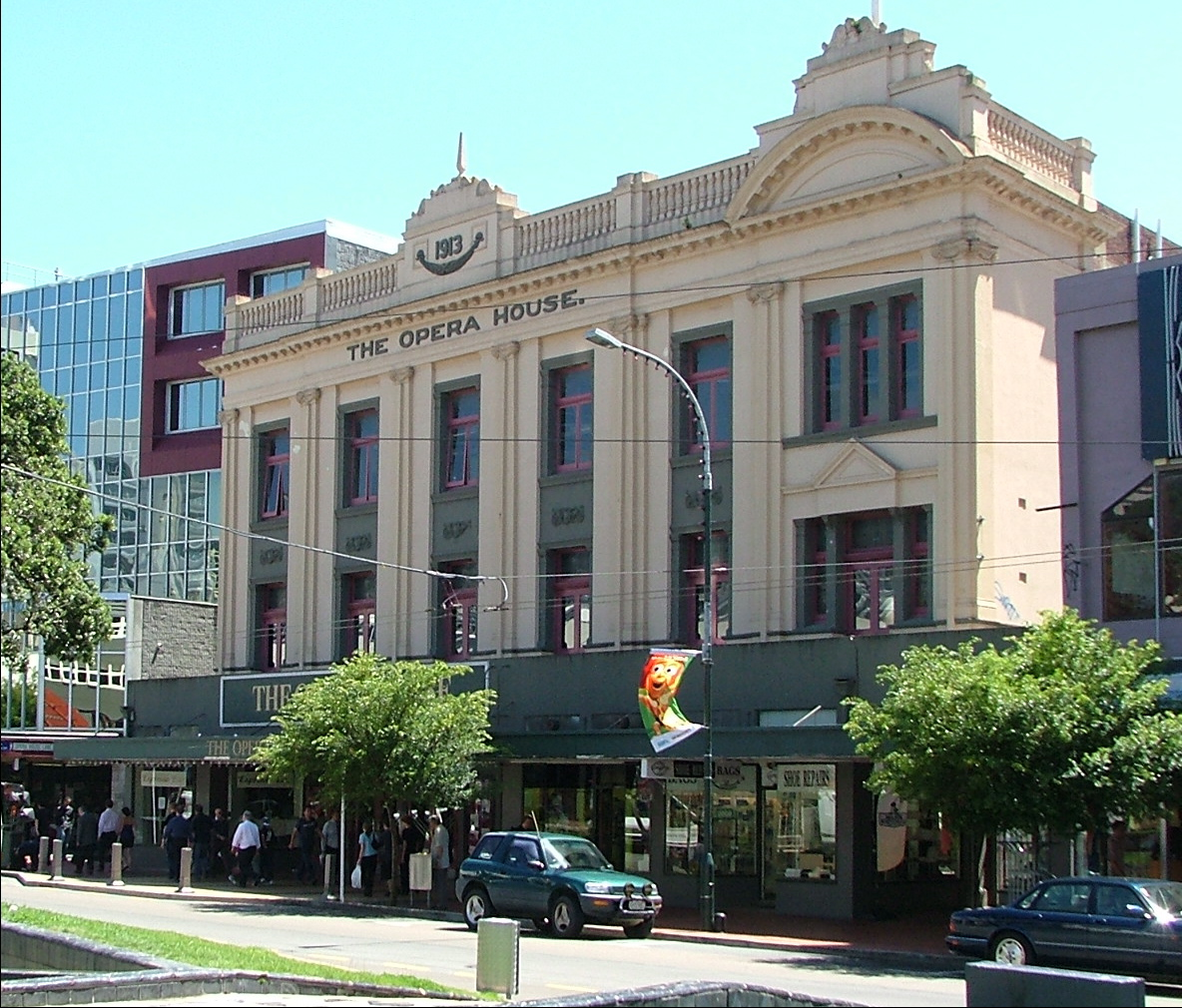
Opera House, Wellington

=== Australia ===
- Adelaide Festival Centre, Adelaide
- Athenaeum, Melbourne
- Canberra Theatre, Canberra
- His Majesty's Theatre, Western Australia, Perth
- Lyric Theatre, Queensland Performing Arts Centre, Brisbane
- State Theatre, Arts Centre Melbourne (also known as the Victorian Arts Centre), Melbourne
- Sydney Opera House, Sydney
- Theatre Royal, Hobart, Tasmania

=== New Zealand ===
- Kiri Te Kanawa Theatre in the Aotea Centre, Auckland, one of the venues of Auckland Live
- Oamaru Opera House, Oamaru
- Opera House, Wellington
- St. James Theatre, Wellington

== See also ==
- List of concert halls
- List of contemporary amphitheatres
