= Modello Palace =

Modello Palace may refer to:

- Palace Modello
- Palazzo Modello
