= Palazzo Modello =

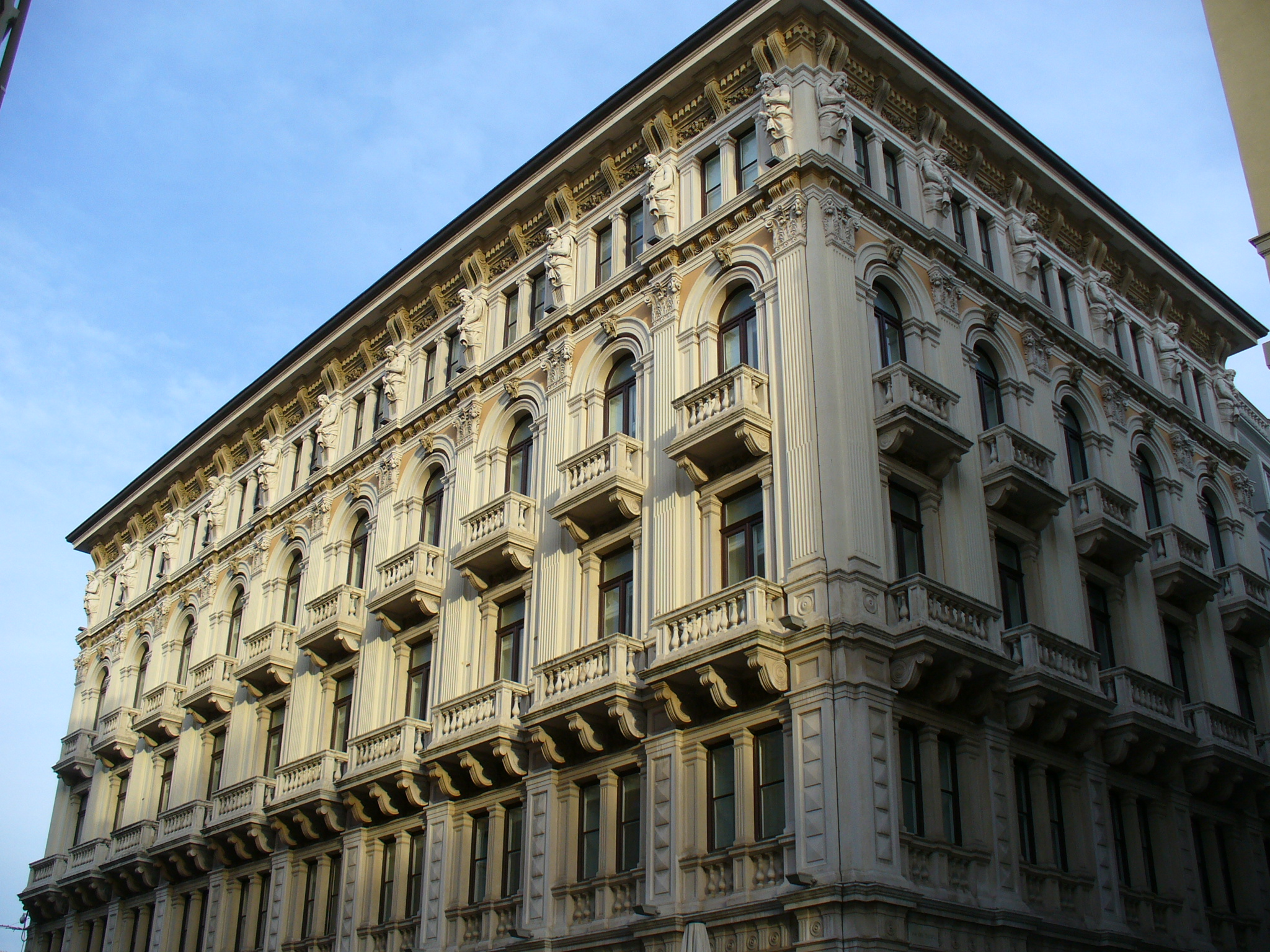
- Palazzo Modello in Trieste
- Click on the map for a fullscreen view

General information
- Location: Trieste, Italy
- Coordinates: 45°38′59.86″N 13°46′07.82″E

Palazzo Modello is a historic building located on Piazza Unità d'Italia in Trieste, Italy.

== History ==
The building was erected between 1871 and 1872 during urban redevelopment works affecting the square. The building stands on a site once occupied by a late medieval chapel dedicated to Saint Peter, itself the ancient namesake for the square, and a seventeenth-century church dedicated to Saint Roch.

Following the demolition of the two religious buildings in 1870, the Municipality of Trieste, which owned the area, commissioned architect Giuseppe Bruni to design a building that would serve as a model for the others to be constructed around the square in the following years. The eclectic style of the façades was indeed echoed both in the Hotel Garni (later renamed Hotel Vanoli and then Grand Hotel Duchi d'Aosta), designed the following year by Eugenio Geiringer and Giovanni Righetti, and in the Trieste City Hall designed by Giuseppe Bruni himself between 1873 and 1875.

== Description ==
The building features an eclectic architecture.
