= Fellner & Helmer =

Austrian architecture studio

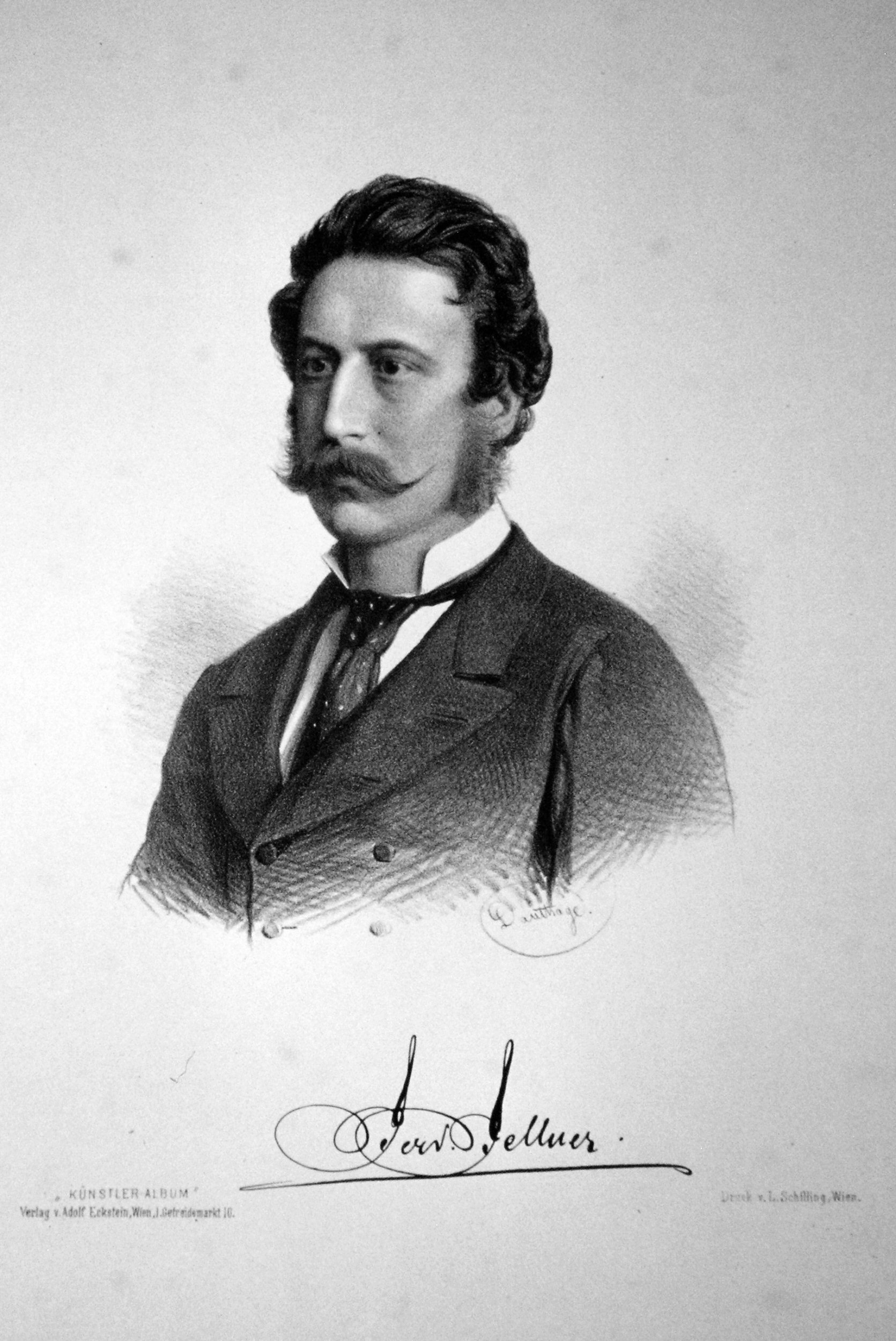
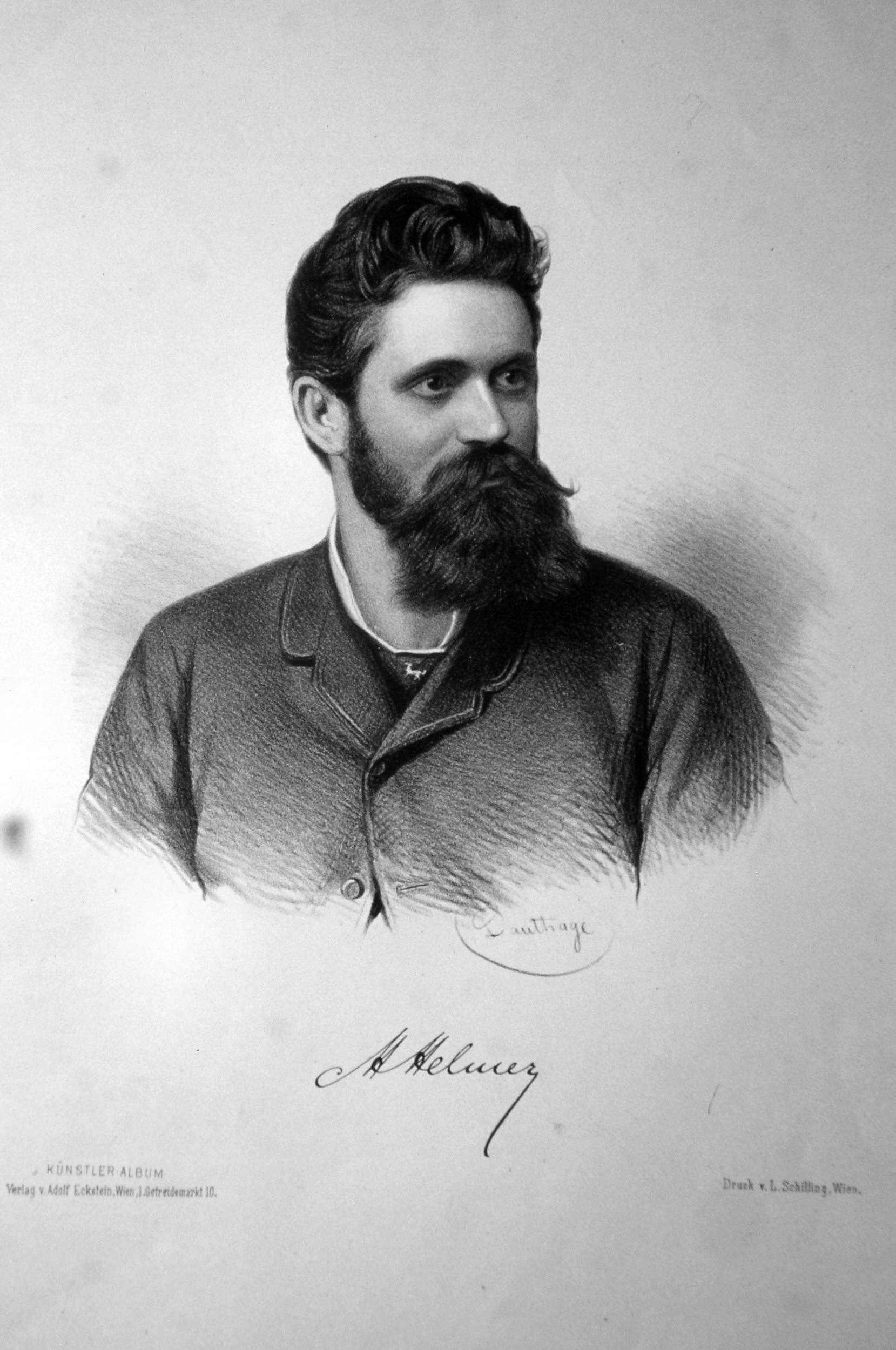
Ferdinand Fellner and Hermann Helmer

Fellner & Helmer was an architecture studio founded in 1873 by Austrian architects Ferdinand Fellner and Hermann Helmer. They designed over 200 buildings (mainly opera houses and apartment buildings) across Europe in the late 19th and early 20th century, which helped bind the Austro-Hungarian Empire together and cement Vienna as its cultural center. While most of the work stood in the former Austro-Hungarian Empire, others can be found from Switzerland to present-day Ukraine. Frequent collaborators for integrated exterior and interior art work include Gustav Klimt, Hans Makart, Theodor Friedl, and other significant artists.

== Theatres ==
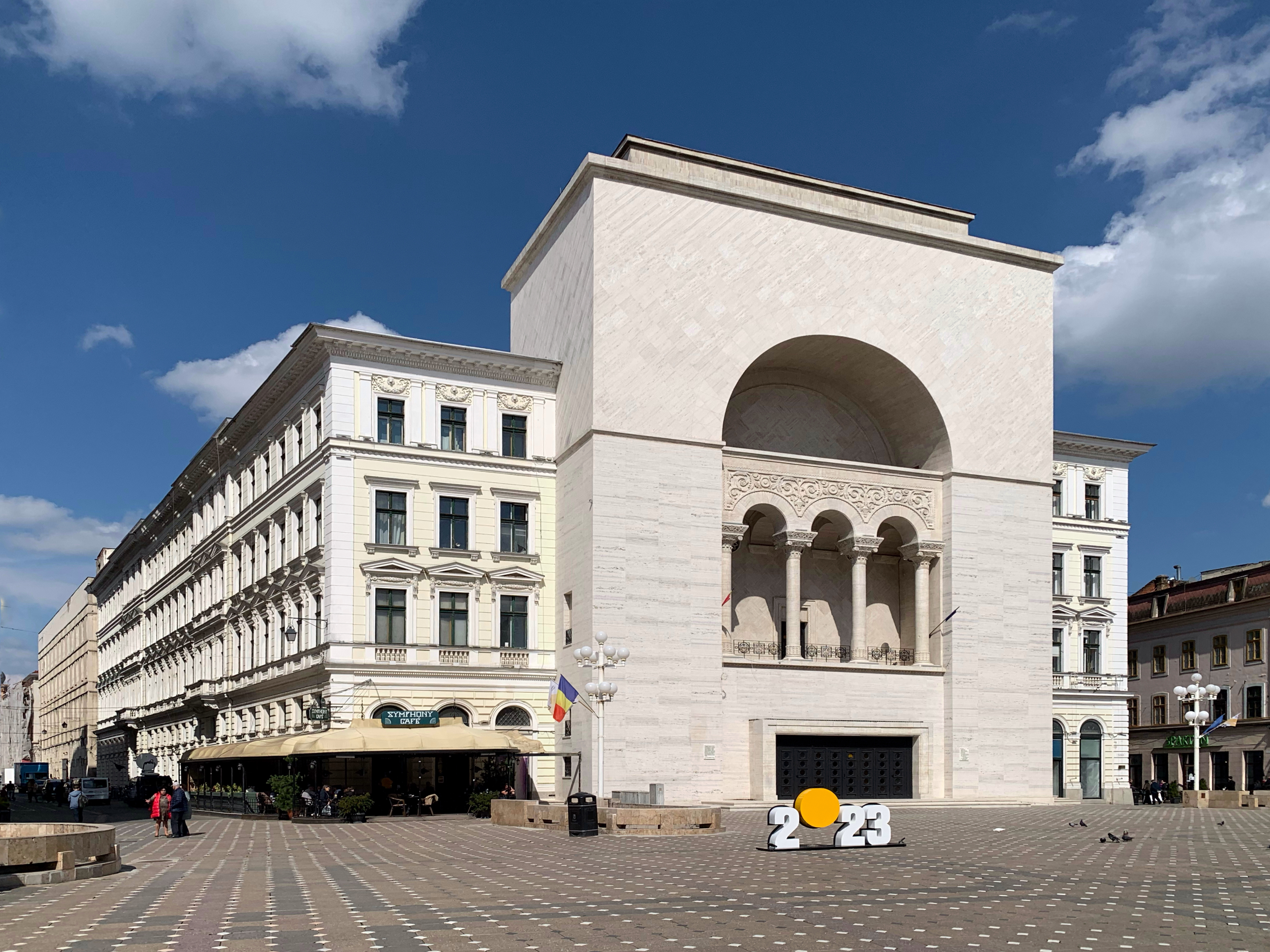
Mihai Eminescu National Theatre and Romanian National Opera in Timișoara. After the building was devastated by a fire, only the side wings remained according to the original design.

=== By Ferdinand Fellner ===
- 1871–72 Wiener Stadttheater, Vienna, Austria (destroyed by fire in 1884). With Ferdinand Fellner the Older.
- 1871–75 National Theatre and Opera, Timișoara, Romania (rebuilt after destroyed by fires in 1880 and 1920, respectively). With Ferdinand Fellner the Older.

=== By Fellner and Helmer ===
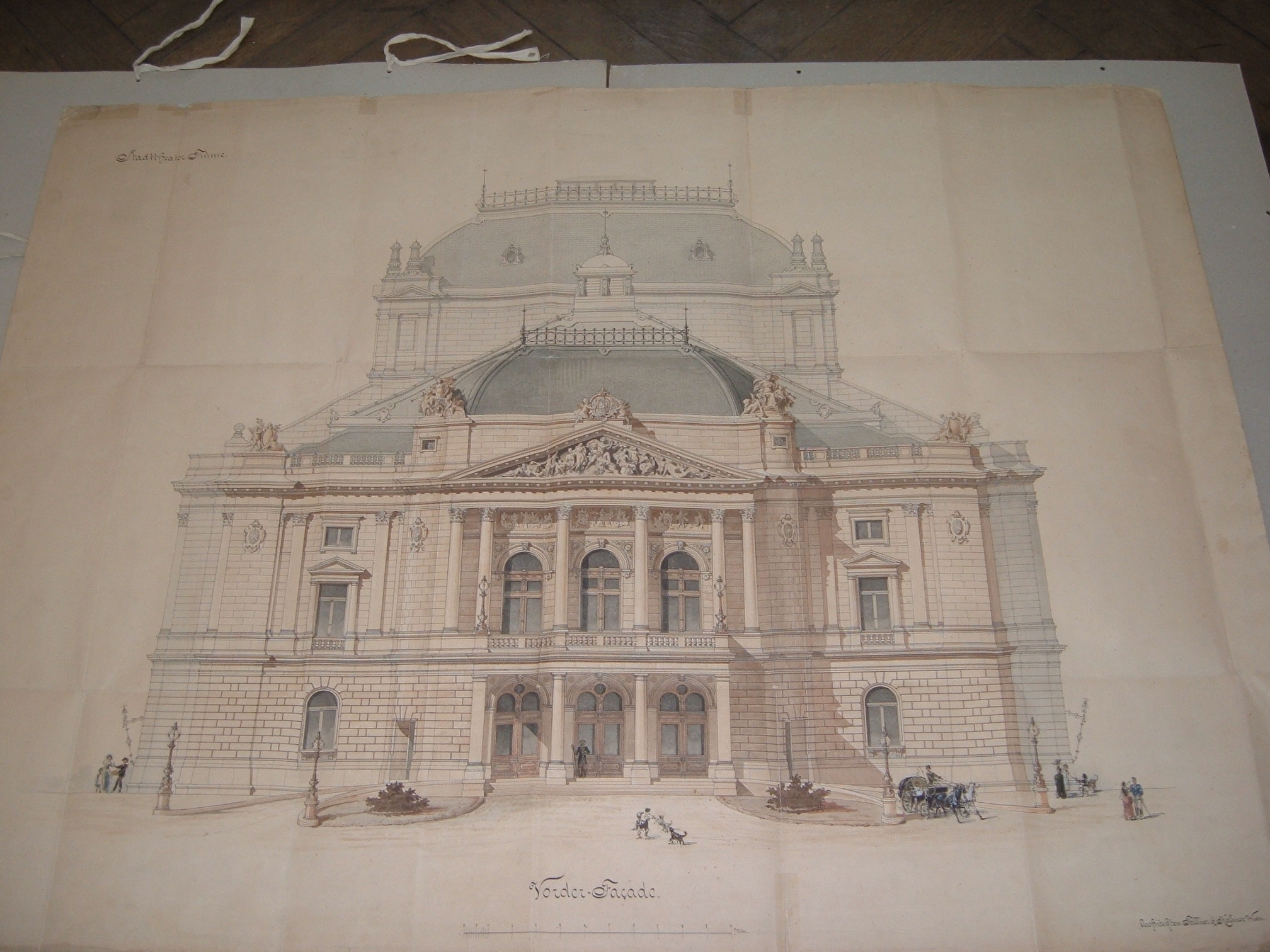
Original design of the Rijeka theatre's west façade (1882)

Theatres designed by Fellner & Helmer

- 1873 Croatian National Theatre in Varaždin
- 1874–75 Népszínház, Budapest, Hungary (demolished 1965)
- 1881–82 Mahen Theatre in Brno, Czech Republic, (one of the first theatres in Europe with electrical lighting)
- 1881–83 "Stadttheater" in Liberec, Czech Republic
- 1882–83 Szeged National Theatre, Hungary
- 1883–85 Croatian National Theatre in Rijeka, Croatia
- 1884–86 Theatre in Karlovy Vary, Czech Republic
- 1884–87 Opera Theater, Odesa, Ukraine
- 1885–86 "Königliches Freistädtisches Theater", Bratislava, Slovakia, 1886, the old building of today's Slovak National Theatre
- 1886–87 "Neues Deutsches Theater", Prague, Czech Republic (today's State Opera)
- 1887–88 Ronacher, Vienna, Austria (altered after fire)
- 1888–89 Volkstheater (previously Deutsches Volkstheater), Vienna, Austria
- 1890–91 Opera House, Zürich, Switzerland
- 1891–92 Komische Oper in Berlin, Germany
- 1892–93 State Theatre in Salzburg, Austria
- 1892–94 Hessisches Staatstheater Wiesbaden, Germany
- 1893–95 Tonhalle, Zürich, Switzerland
- 1894–95 Croatian National Theatre in Zagreb, Croatia
- 1894–96 Iaşi National Theatre, Romania
- 1895–96 Vígszínház in Budapest, Hungary
- 1895–96 Katona József Theatre, Kecskemet, Hungary
- 1896–97 Konzerthaus Ravensburg, Germany
- 1898–99 Opernhaus in Graz, Austria
- 1898–99 Stadttheater in Berndorf, Austria
- 1899–1900 Oradea National Theatre, Oradea, Romania
- 1899–1900 Deutsches Schauspielhaus, Hamburg, Germany
- 1901–02 Stadttheater Fürth, Germany
- 1902 Theater an der Wien, Vienna, Austria (altered 1960–1961)
- 1903–04 Wilam Horzyca Theatre, Toruń, Poland
- 1904–05 Kobylianska Drama Theatre in Chernivtsi, Ukraine
- 1904–06 Ivan Vazov National Theatre, Sofia, Bulgaria
- 1904–06 Cluj-Napoca National Theatre, Cluj-Napoca, Romania
- 1906–07 Theatre in Jablonec nad Nisou, Czech Republic
- 1906–07 Stadttheater Gießen, Germany
- 1906–09 Theatre in Mladá Boleslav, Czech Republic
- 1908–09 Stadttheater, Baden bei Wien, Austria
- 1909–10 Stadttheater in Klagenfurt, Austria (expansion 1996-98 by Günther Domenig)
- 1909–10 Adam Mickiewicz Theatre, Cieszyn, Poland
- 1910–13 Konzerthaus, Vienna, Austria
- 1911–13 Akademietheater, Vienna, Austria

== Other buildings ==
- 1881 István Károlyi or Károlyi-Csekonics Palace, Múzeum utca 17 in Budapest's Palace District, Hungary
- 1885 Palace Modello in Rijeka, Croatia
- 1886 Warenhaus Rothberger, Vienna
- 1894 Palais Rothschild, Prinz-Eugen-Straße, Vienna, Austria
- 1894–95 Palais Lanckoronski, Vienna, Austria
- 1897 Castle, Žinkovy, Czech Republic
- 1897–1898 Noble Casino, Lviv, Ukraine
- Colonnade Park (Czech: Sadová kolonáda), Karlovy Vary, Czech Republic
- Grandhotel Pupp, Karlovy Vary, Czech Republic
- Hotel Slovan (as "Hotel Waldeck", 1893) in Plzeň, Czech Republic
- Imperial bath (Bath I), Karlovy Vary, Czech Republic
- Market Colonnade, Karlovy Vary, Czech Republic
- Art Pavilion in Zagreb, Croatia, 1898
- Palace of Justice, Suceava, Romania, 1885
- 1898–1900 Goetz Palace in Brzesko, Poland
- 1899–1900 Hotel George, Lviv, Ukraine
- Potocki Palace, Antoniny, Ukraine
- Villa, 20 Mickiewicza Street in Toruń, Poland
- Semmering: Hotel Panhans
- Semmering (Niederösterreich) - Dependance Waldesruhe 1908
- Semmering (Niederösterreich) - Dependance Fürstenhof
- Department store Kastner & Öhler in Graz (1914)

== Gallery ==
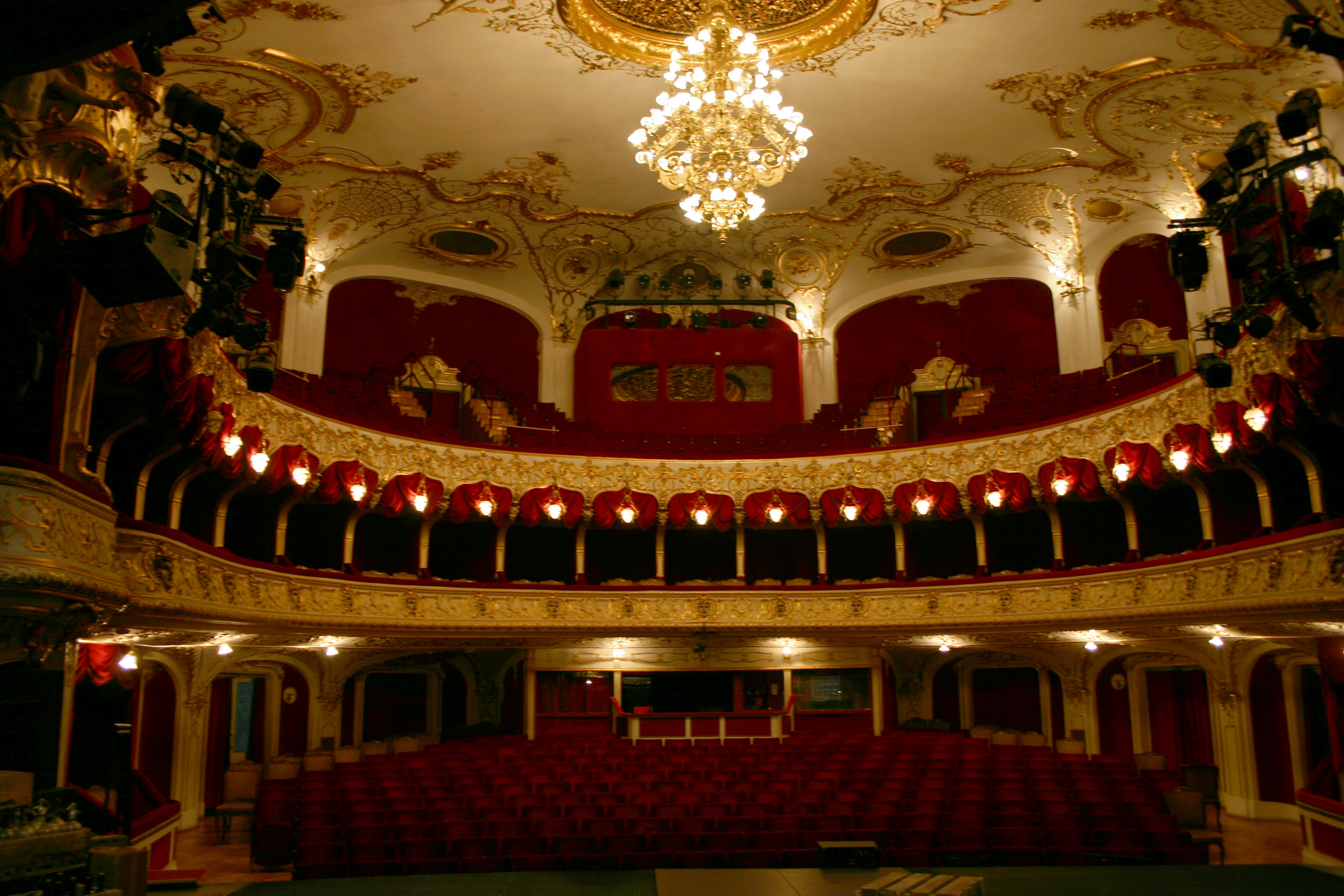
Katona József Theater auditorium

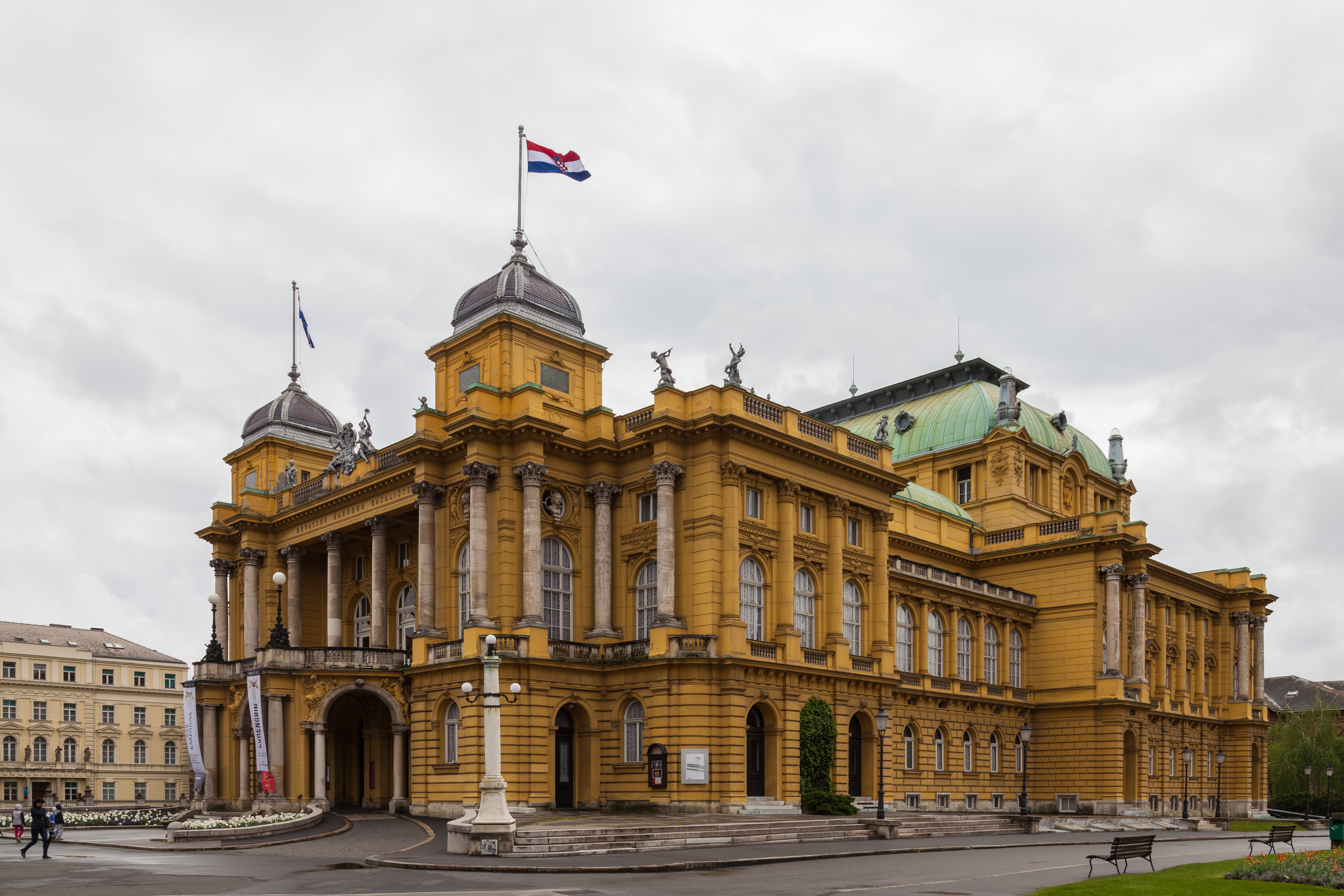
Croatian National Theatre in Zagreb

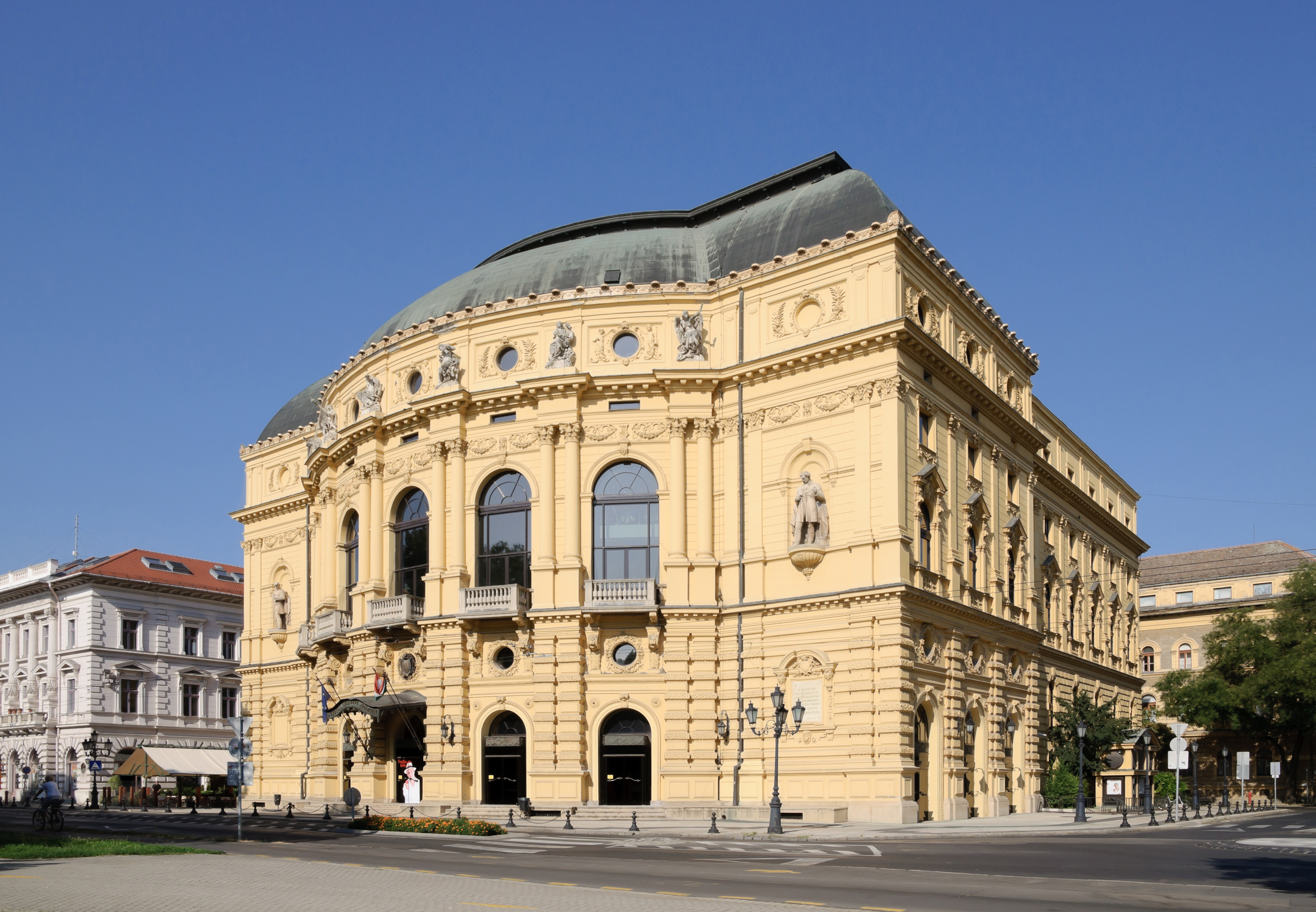
National Theatre of Szeged (1883)

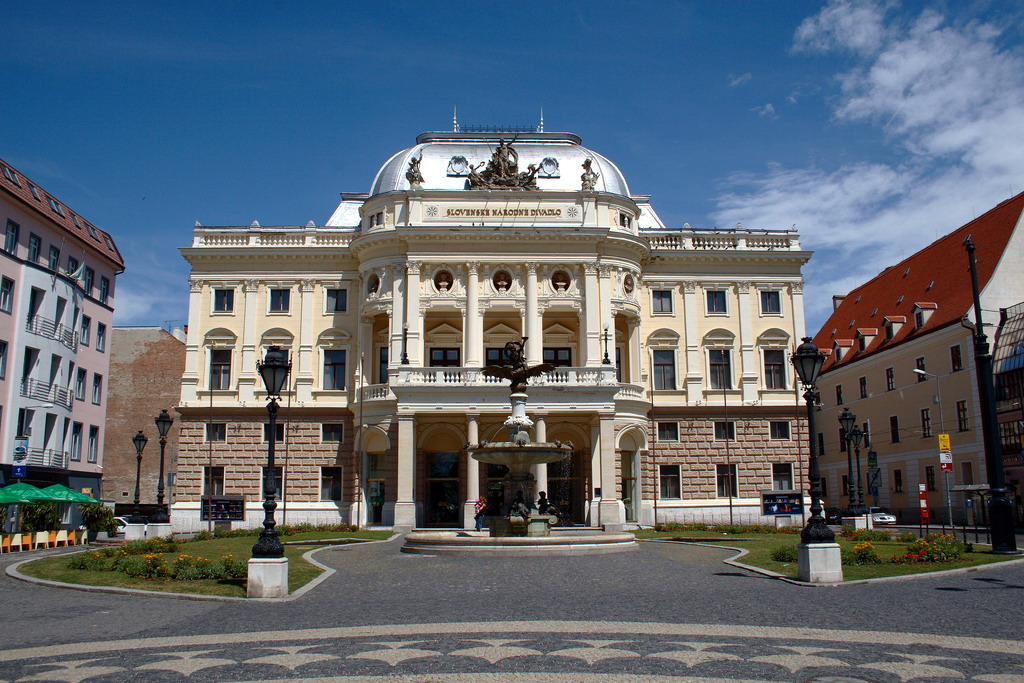
Slovak National Theatre, Bratislava (1885-86)

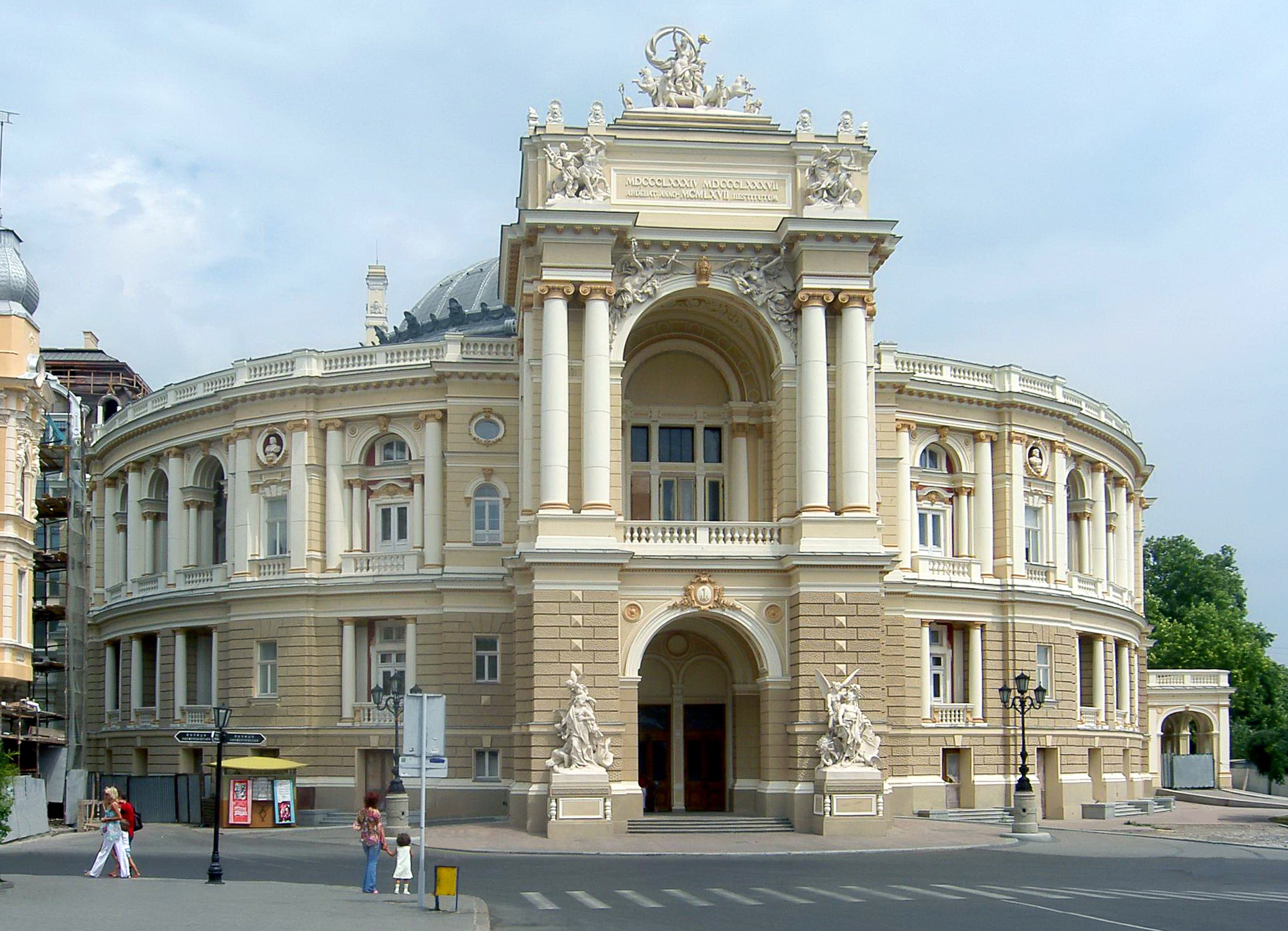
Odesa Opera and Ballet Theater (1887)

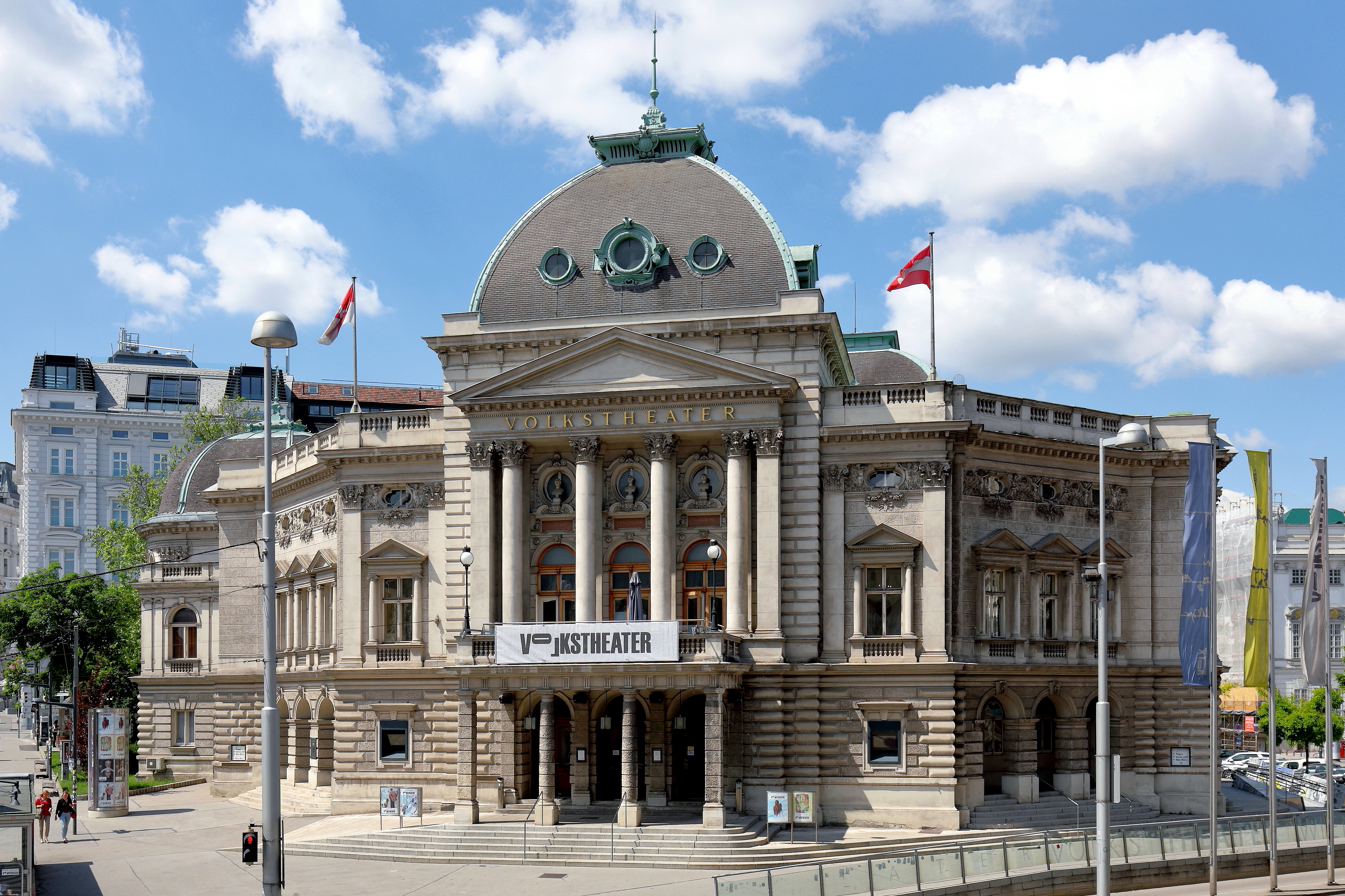
Volkstheater, Vienna (1889)

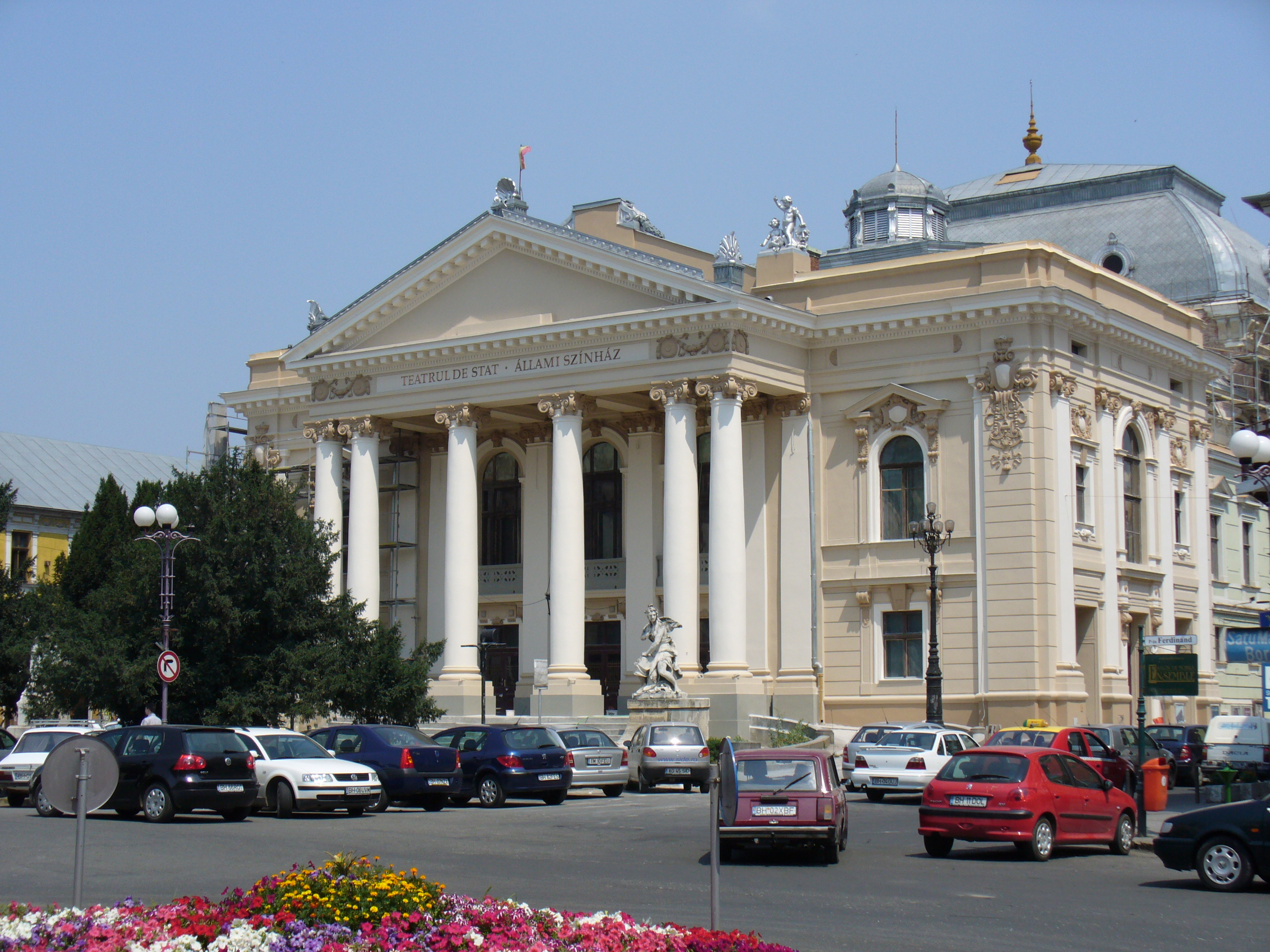
Oradea National Theatre (1900)

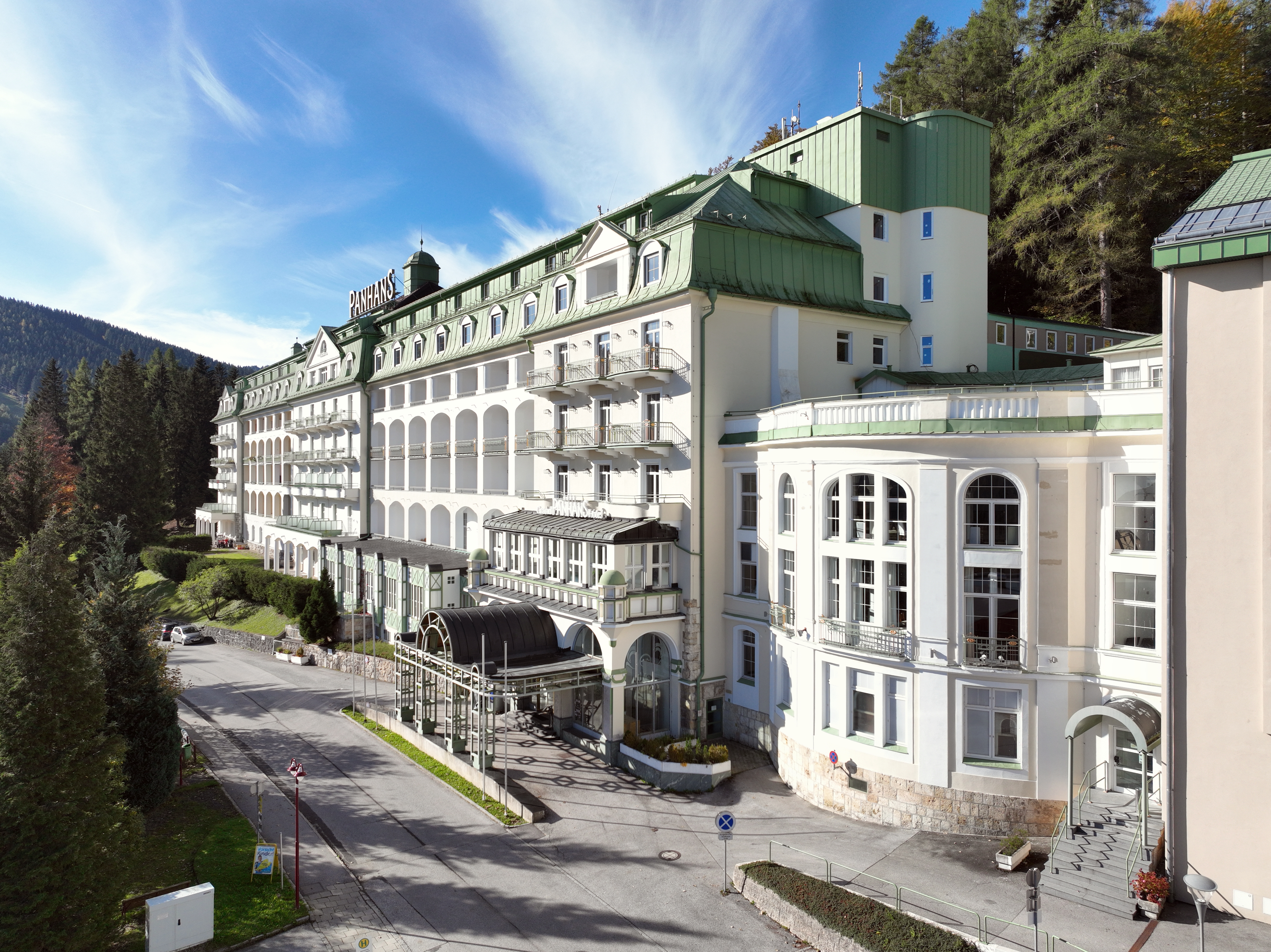
Hotel Panhans in Semmering (1913)

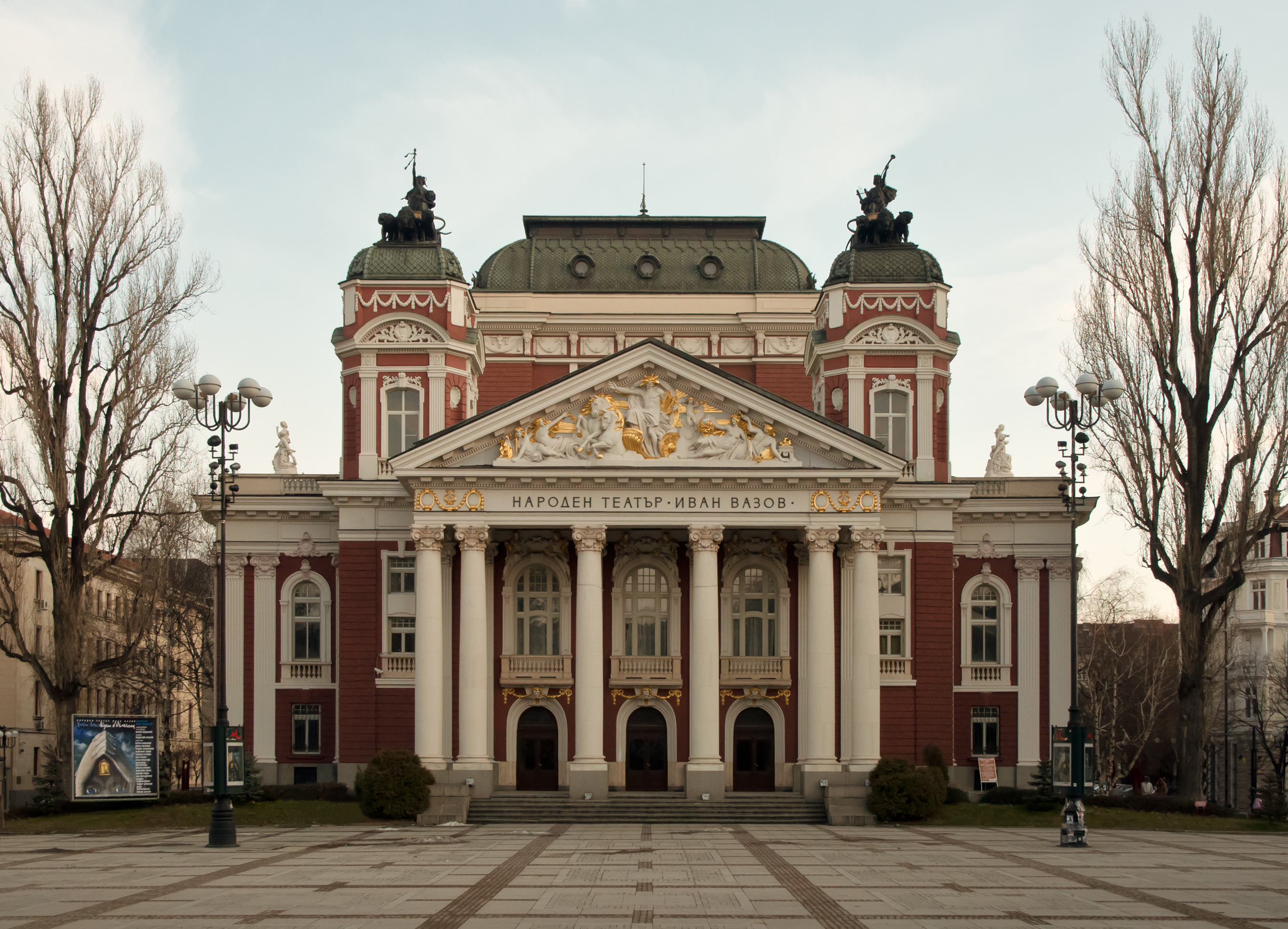
Ivan Vazov National Theatre, Sofia (1906)

== Sources ==
- "Theatres built by Fellner & Helmer". andreas-praefcke.de.
