= Warenhaus Rothberger =

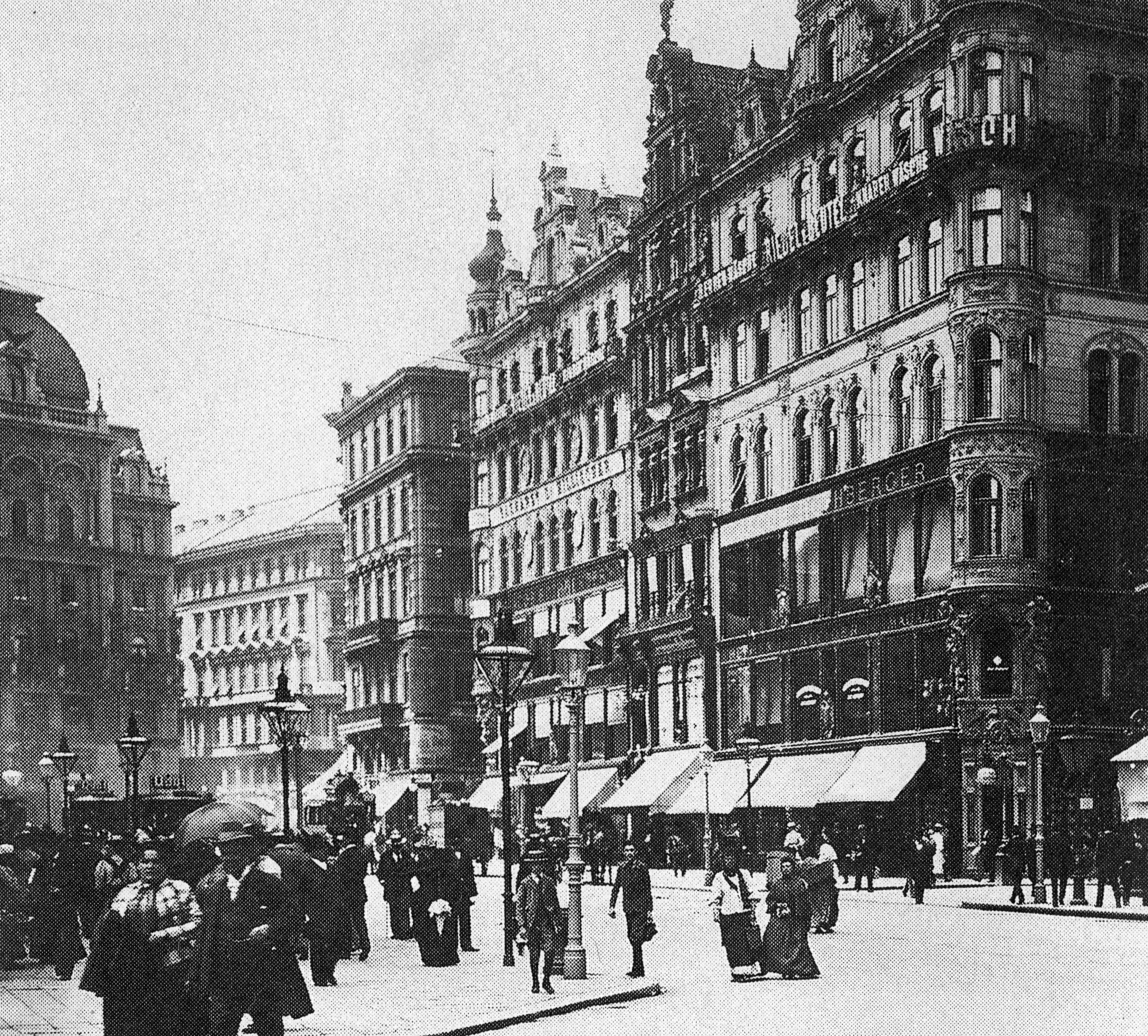
Warenhaus Rothberger on Stephansplatz in Vienna, around 1900

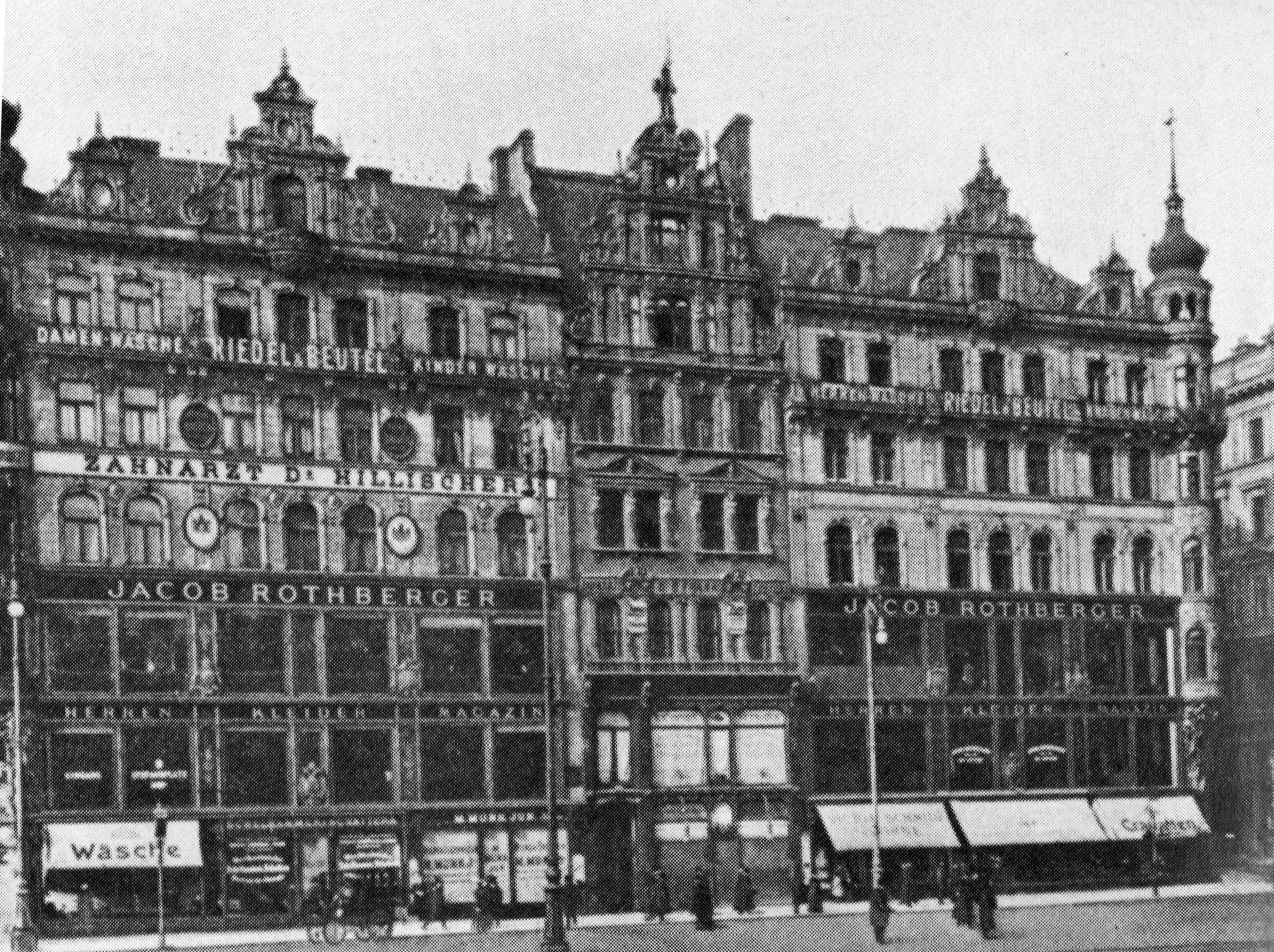
The two parts of the department store were separated by the narrow building at Stephansplatz 10

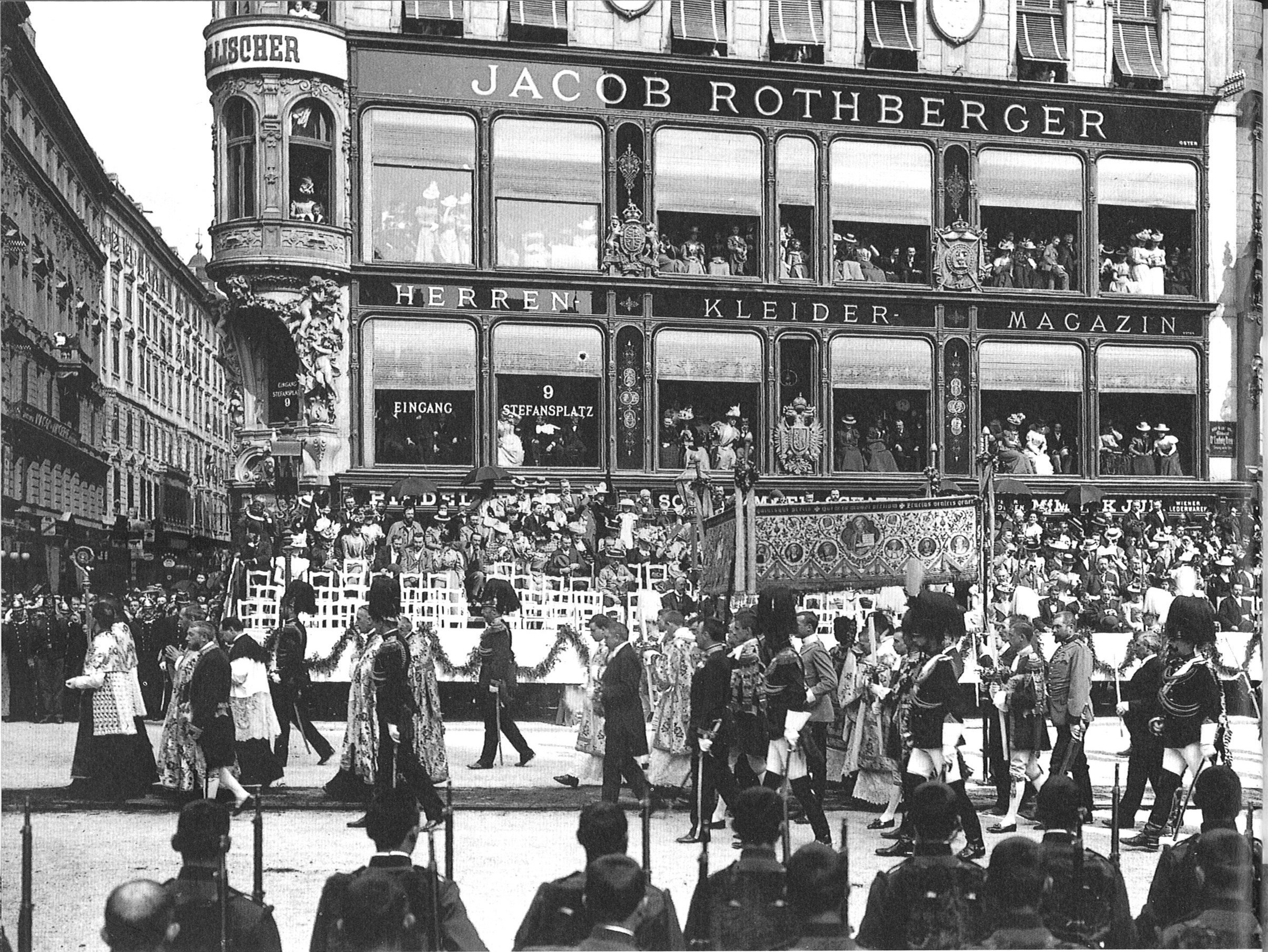
Emperor Franz Joseph I on foot during the Corpus Christi procession. Onlookers rented the best seats in the Rothberger department store to get a closer look at the Emperor

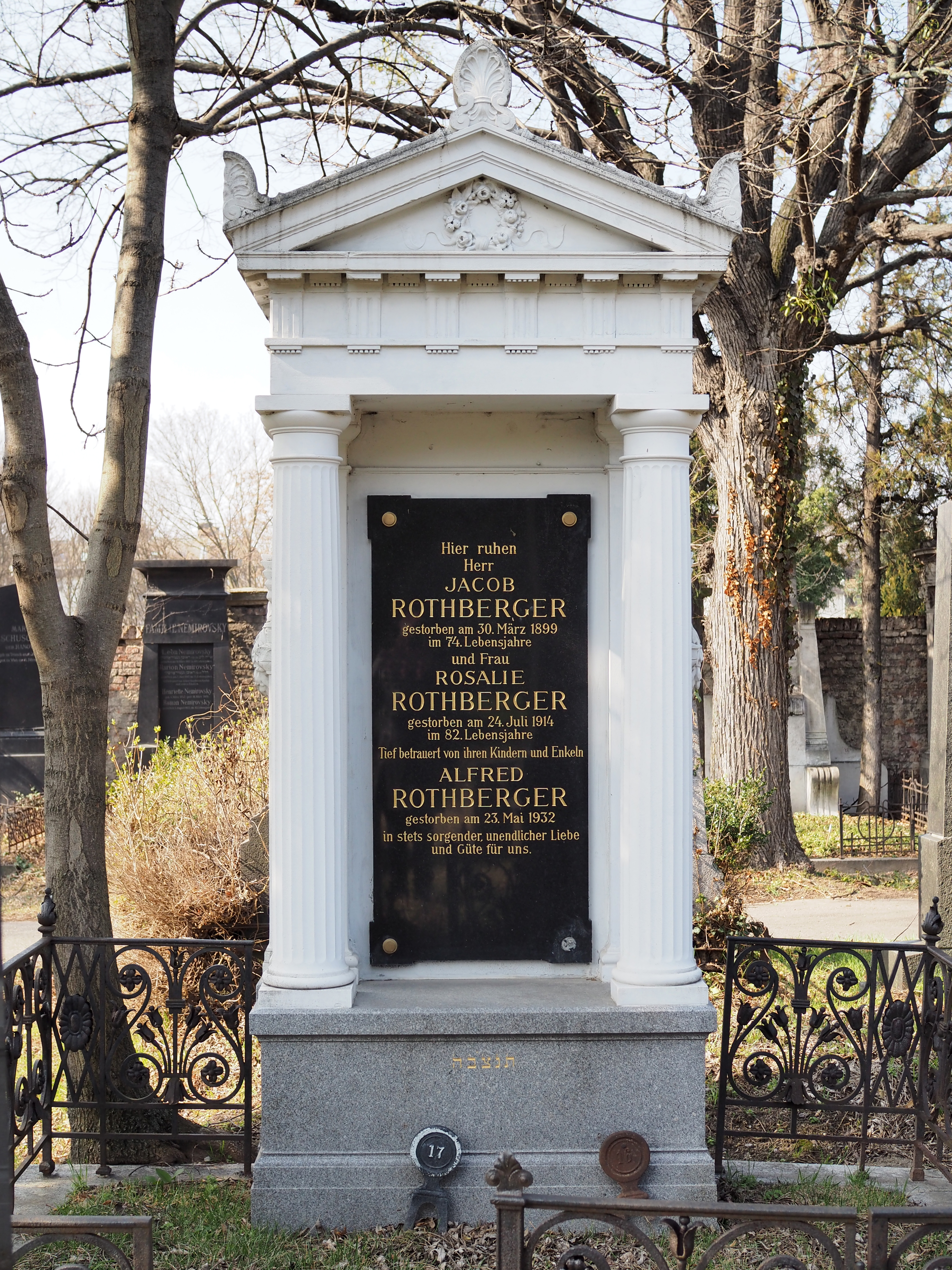
Jacob Rothberger's grave in the old Israelite section of the Vienna Central Cemetery

Warenhaus Rothberger was a large textile department store in Vienna.

== History ==
The company founder Jacob Rothberger was born on December 9, 1825 in Albertirsa in Pest County (Hungary) and worked for several years as a tailor in Paris. In 1855, he applied for a trade license as a tailor for the inner city of Vienna, which he received in 1856. Rothberger also kept a stock of finished clothes from the very beginning. In 1861, he opened a small store on the third floor of the house at Stephansplatz 9. Part of the business concept was also a clothes bank, where customers could hand in their old clothes and receive reductions on the purchase price of new textiles.

The developing ready-to-wear business was supported by an imperial patent dated December 20, 1859, which replaced the old guild regulations with new, more liberal trade regulations. Rothberger's company expanded and the building on Stephansplatz was acquired. In 1886, the new "Kleiderpalast", the work of architects Fellner & Helmer, was opened. With its electric lighting, hydraulic elevator and steam central heating, the new building met the latest technical standards. The Victor Schmidt & Söhne confectionery store and a lingerie store were the new tenants.

In 1893, Rothberger, whose company now employed hundreds of piece masters in Vienna, also acquired the house at Stephansplatz 11 and had it remodeled by the proven team of architects. The two houses were connected behind the narrow building at Stephansplatz 10, which was situated between them.

In the course of the new building, a conflict arose between the patriarchal Rothberger and the Vienna City Council, and the conflict escalated, not least because of the prominent location opposite St. Stephen's Cathedral and the increasing anti-Semitism of small businesses. The municipal council meeting on May 8, 1894, therefore witnessed furious scenes.The Christian Social municipal councillor Josef Gregorig, for example, regretted the fact that "a Judenburg will rise on an old German site, a mausoleum of old pants". However, this did not initially hinder the prosperous progress of the company. When Jakob Rothberger died on March 30, 1899, his sons Heinrich (born September 13, 1868 in Vienna; died January 20, 1953 in Montreal), Alfred (born October 24, 1873 in Vienna; died May 23, 1932 in Vienna) and Moriz (born December 24, 1865 in Vienna; died September 20, 1944 in Vienna) took over the management of the company - together. On May 20, 1905, every buyer received an American watch in good condition to mark the 50th anniversary of the company, which had already been established as a purveyor to the imperial and royal court in 1867. Nothing is known about further celebrations.

The company remained successful in the first third of the 20th century and was run as a family business.

== Art collection ==
Heinrich Rothberger collected art, and had an outstanding porcelaine collection, much of which was confiscated by the Nazi-controlled Vienna city council in 1938.

== Nazi era ==
In 1938, after Austria's merged with Nazi Germany in the "Anschluss", the company was "Aryanized", that is forcibly transferred to a non-Jewish owner as part of anti-Jewish persecution campaign. In the early summer of 1938, the elder son of Ella and Heinrich Rothberger, Johann Jacob, known as Hans, was arrested and sent to the Dachau concentration camp to pressure Heinrich and Ella Rothberger and the other family members into selling.The buyer was Wilhelm Bührer, a businessman from Berlin.

Albert and Karl, the two sons of Alfred and Hilda Rothberger left Austria before June 30, 1938.2 Albert fled to Haiti, but died on August 30, 1938 in Port-Aau in Port-au-Prince at the age of just 21. Karl finally made it to the USA, but also died very young, at the age of 24, on December 31, 1939 in New York. Fritz Rothberger, the younger son of Heinrich and Ella Rothberger emigrated to England in 1939 and to Canada in 1940.

== Postwar ==
At the end of the war in 1945, both Rothberger houses burned down. Renovation and reconstruction work then began, which was pre-financed by a bank. However, the Rothberger heirs eventually sold the property to an insurance company and the reconstruction was in line with the aesthetic expectations of the post-war period.

== Literature ==
- Franz Planer (Hrsg.): Das Jahrbuch der Wiener Gesellschaft 1928. Wien 1928, S. 286.
- Edith Hann: Herrenkleider-Magazin Jacob Rothberger. Eine Fallstudie zur Entwicklung der Wiener Herrenkonfektion. In: Andreas Lehne (Hrsg.), Gerhard Meißl, Edith Hann: Wiener Warenhäuser. 1865–1914. Deuticke, Wien 1990, ISBN 3-7005-4488-X, S. 85 ff.
- Dieter Klein, Martin Kupf, Robert Schediwy: Stadtbildverluste Wien. Ein Rückblick auf fünf Jahrzehnte. Dritte Auflage. LIT-Verlag, Wien 2005, ISBN 3-8258-7754-X, S. 100.
- Joseph Schwaighofer: Zur Geschichte des Wiener Warenhauses. Wettbewerbe Architekturjournal, Nr. 267/268, Februar/März 2008, S. 36 f.
- Gabriele Anderl (Hrsg.): … wesentlich mehr Fälle als angenommen. Zehn Jahre Kommission für Provenienzforschung. Schriftenreihe der Kommission für Provenienzforschung, Band 1, ZDB-ID 2475781-0. Böhlau, Wien (u. a.) 2009, ISBN 978-3-205-78183-7.
- Christina Gschiel, Ulrike Nimeth, Leonhard Weidinger: schneidern und sammeln: Die Wiener Familie Rothberger. Wien/Köln/Weimar 2010, ISBN 3-20578-414-6.
