= Stadttheater Klagenfurt =

Theatre in Klagenfurt, Carinthia, Austria

Coordinates: 46°37′37″N 14°18′19″E

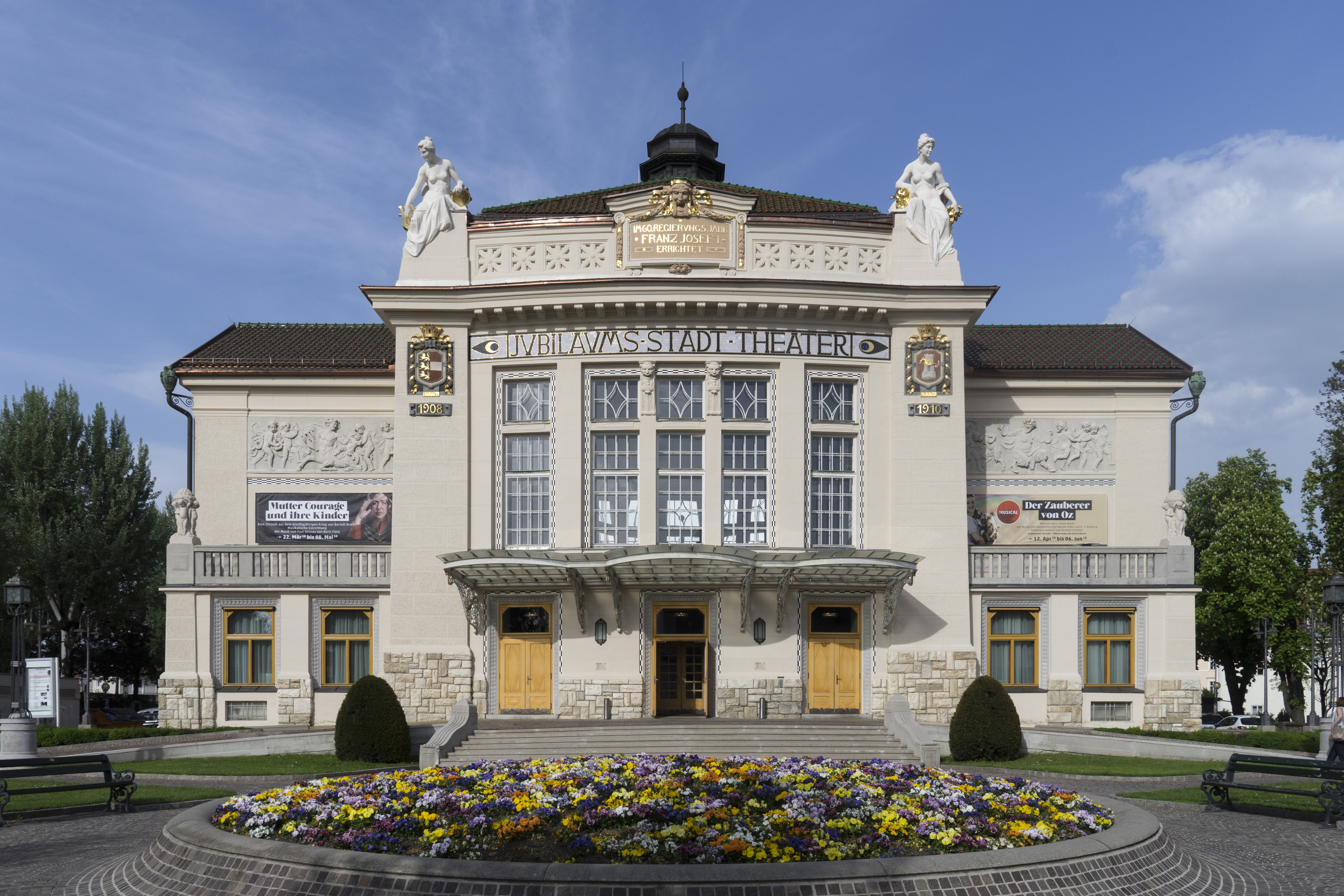
Stadttheater Klagenfurt

The Stadttheater Klagenfurt is the municipal theatre in Klagenfurt, the capital of Carinthia in Austria. Its present house was designed by the Viennese architecture office Fellner & Helmer, and completed in 1910.

== History ==
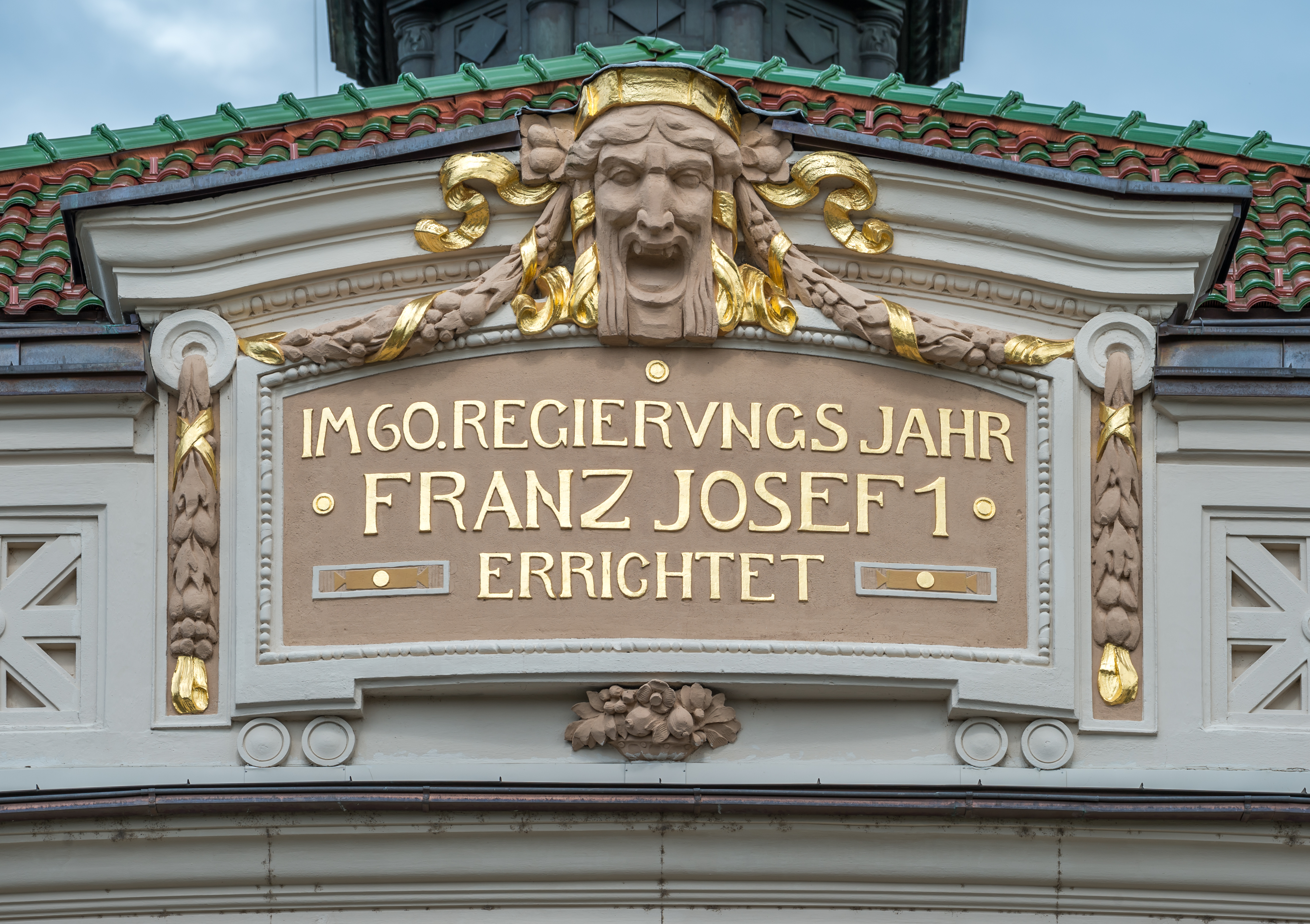
Detail on upper part of building facade

The first theatre in Klagenfurt was installed between 1605 and 1620 as Ballhaus for the aristocracy. Italian troupes appeared, on their way from Venice to Vienna. At the end of the 18th century, the theatre was occasionally opened also for intellectuals, and military and civil officials. In 1811, the wooden structure was rebuilt in stone, called now Altes Theater (Old Theatre).

When it deteriorated, a new house was designed by the Viennese architecture office Fellner & Helmer, who had already built the very similar theatres in Gießen and Gablonz, in 1906 and 1907. Building began in 1908 and was completed in 1910. The house was opened on the occasion of the 60th jubilee of Franz Joseph I of Austria and therefore named "Kaiser Franz Joseph I. Jubiläumstheater".

In the 1960s, the house was renovated, and again from 1996 to 1998 after designs by Günther Domenig.

The Stadttheater Klagenfurt was awarded the Nestroy Theatre Prize in different categories in 2003, 2006 and 2011. Artists who received the prize and worked for this theatre have included Martin Kušej, Bernd Liepold-Mosser, Michael Maertens, Michael Schottenberg and Martin Zehetgruber.
