= Piazza Unità d'Italia =

Square in Trieste, Italy

Coordinates: 45°39′00″N 13°46′04″E

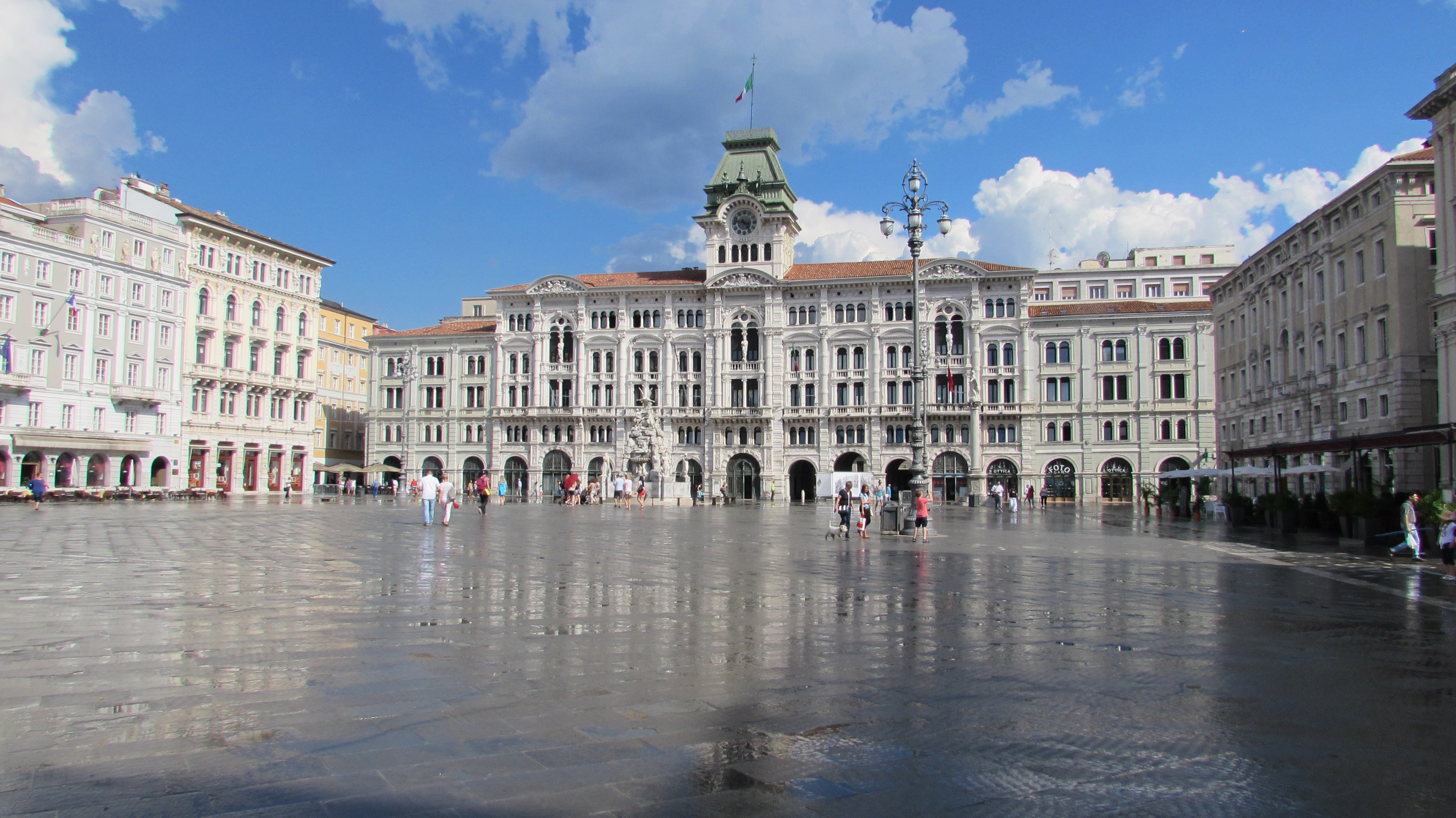
Piazza Unità d'Italia, headed by the Trieste City Hall

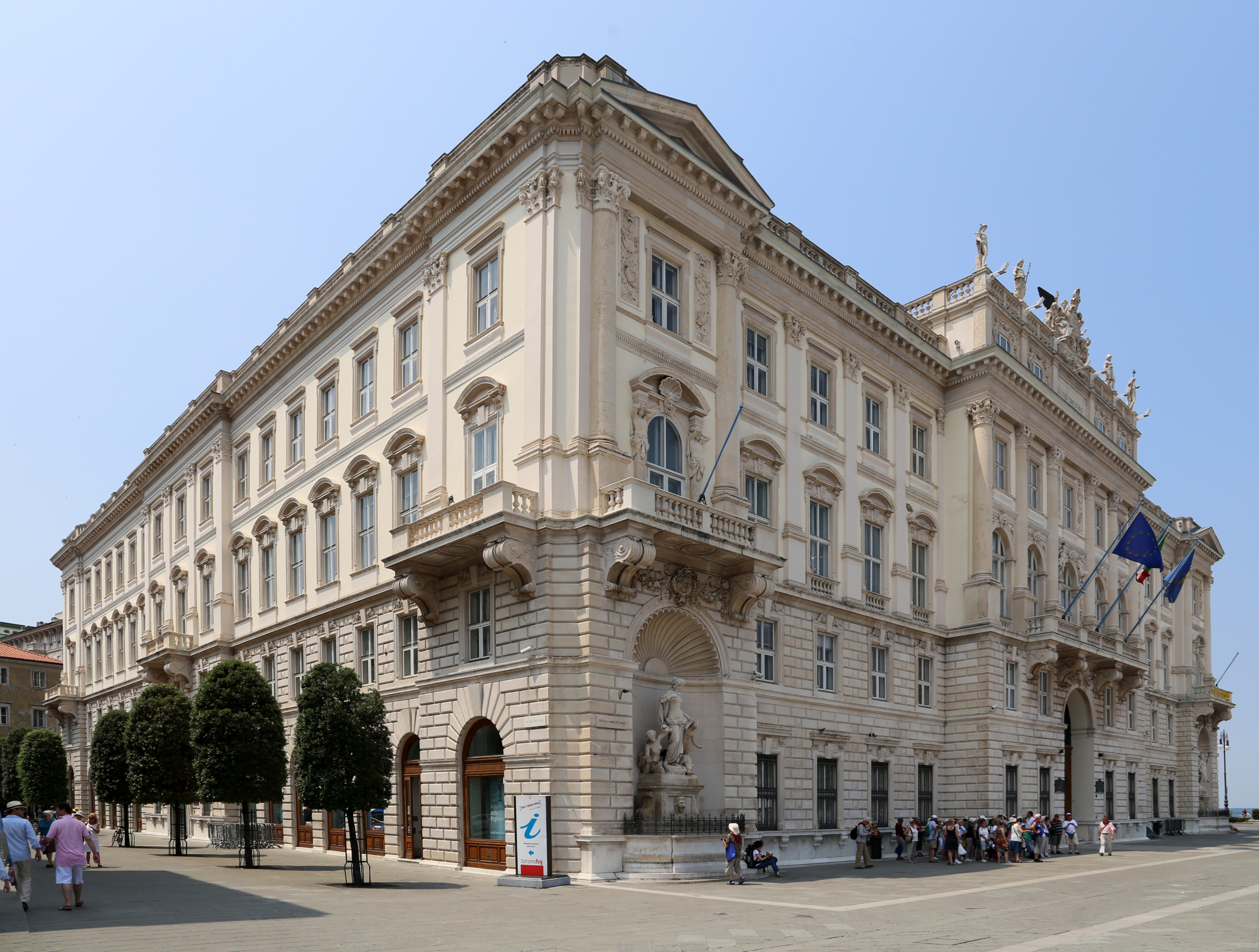
Previous head office of Italia Marittima

Piazza Unità d'Italia (English: Unity of Italy Square) is the main square in Trieste, a seaport city in northeast Italy. Located at the foot of the hill with the castle of San Giusto, the square faces the Adriatic Sea. It is often said to be Europe's largest square located next to the sea. The square was built during the period when Trieste was the most important seaport of the Austrian-Hungarian Empire and includes the city's municipal buildings and other important palaces.

Before 1919 it was known as Piazza Grande, or Great Square. The local Slovenes still refer to it as Veliki trg (Great Square), both in daily speech and in the media. In the last decade, the term Trg zedinjenja (Unity Square) or Trg zedinjenja Italije (Unity of Italy Square) has also become popular, especially in official documents.

The square itself has occasionally been used as a concert venue, with Green Day using the square as a venue for a show on their 99 Revolutions Tour in 2013. The attendance was of 12,000 people. In 2016, it was used by heavy metal band Iron Maiden as a concert venue (it was the third of three Italian dates): the concert was sold out with over 15,000 fans.

The square is also occasionally used for visits of foreign heads of state and meetings. In November 2013 President of Russia Vladimir Putin met Italian Prime Minister Enrico Letta there for bilateral talks. In July 2017 a trilateral meeting attended by Angela Merkel, Emmanuel Macron, and Paolo Gentiloni was held there, as well as the fourth Western Balkans Summit. On 7th July 2024 Pope Francis celebrated Holy Mass in the square as part of the 50th Social Week of Catholics in Italy.

== Gallery ==
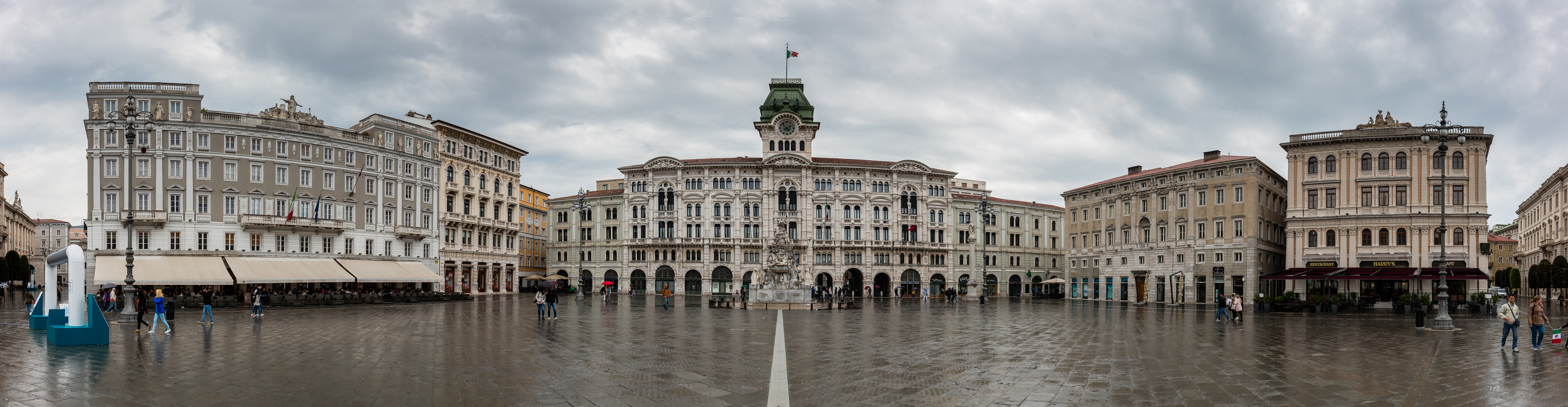
Piazza Unità d'Italia, 2017

Piazza Unità d'Italia, 2009
