= Trieste City Hall =

- Palazzo del Municipio
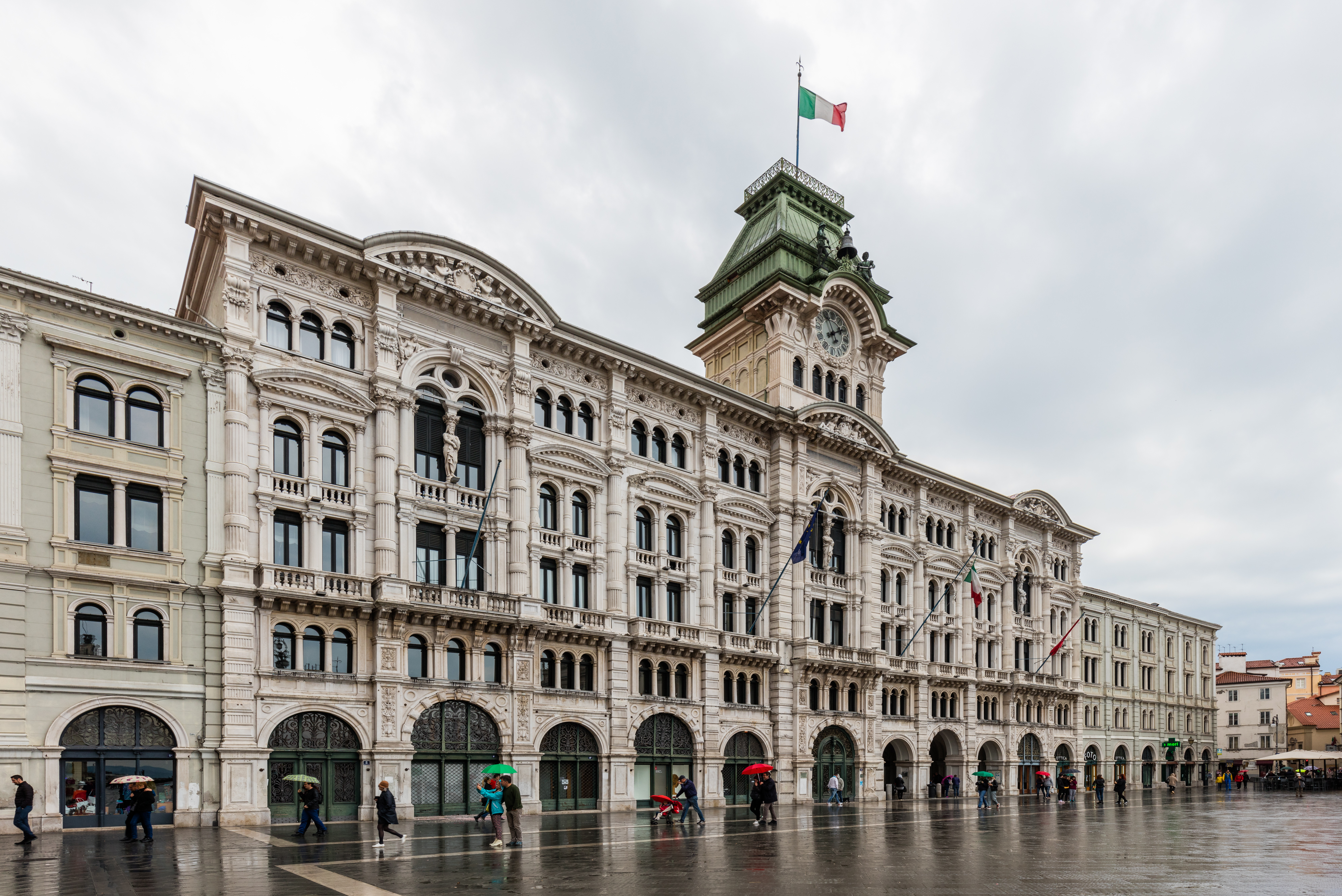
- The main façade of Trieste City Hall overlooking Piazza Unità d'Italia
- Interactive map of the Trieste City Hall area
- Alternative names: Palazzo Municipale

General information
- Status: Completed
- Type: City hall
- Architectural style: Eclectic, Neo-Renaissance
- Location: Piazza Unità d'Italia, Trieste, Friuli Venezia Giulia, Italy, Piazza Unità d'Italia 4
- Current tenants: Municipality of Trieste
- Construction started: 1873
- Opened: 1875; 151 years ago
- Owner: Municipality of Trieste

Design and construction
- Architect: Giuseppe Bruni

Trieste City Hall (Italian: Palazzo del Municipio di Trieste, Slovene: Tržaška mestna hiša) is the seat of the city and commune of Trieste in the Italian region of Friuli Venezia Giulia. Situated on the eastern side of Piazza Unità d'Italia, the building serves as the headquarters of the city's administration and is one of the square's most prominent architectural landmarks. Designed by architect Giuseppe Bruni and completed in 1875 during the Austro-Hungarian period, the city hall is noted for its eclectic Neo-Renaissance design and distinctive central clock tower overlooking the Adriatic waterfront.

== History ==
The building, designed by architect Giuseppe Bruni, was erected between 1873 and 1875, when Trieste was part of Austria-Hungary. Bruni's project had been chosen because it had the advantage to stay within the planned budget and to easily fit the old building previously located there. Construction works were supervisioned by Eugenio Geiringer.

In 1938, Italian dictator Benito Mussolini announced the promulgation of the Italian racial laws from a stage located right in front of the building.

== Description ==
The building is located on the large Piazza Unità d'Italia with its main façade facing the sea. It features an eclectic style.

== Gallery ==
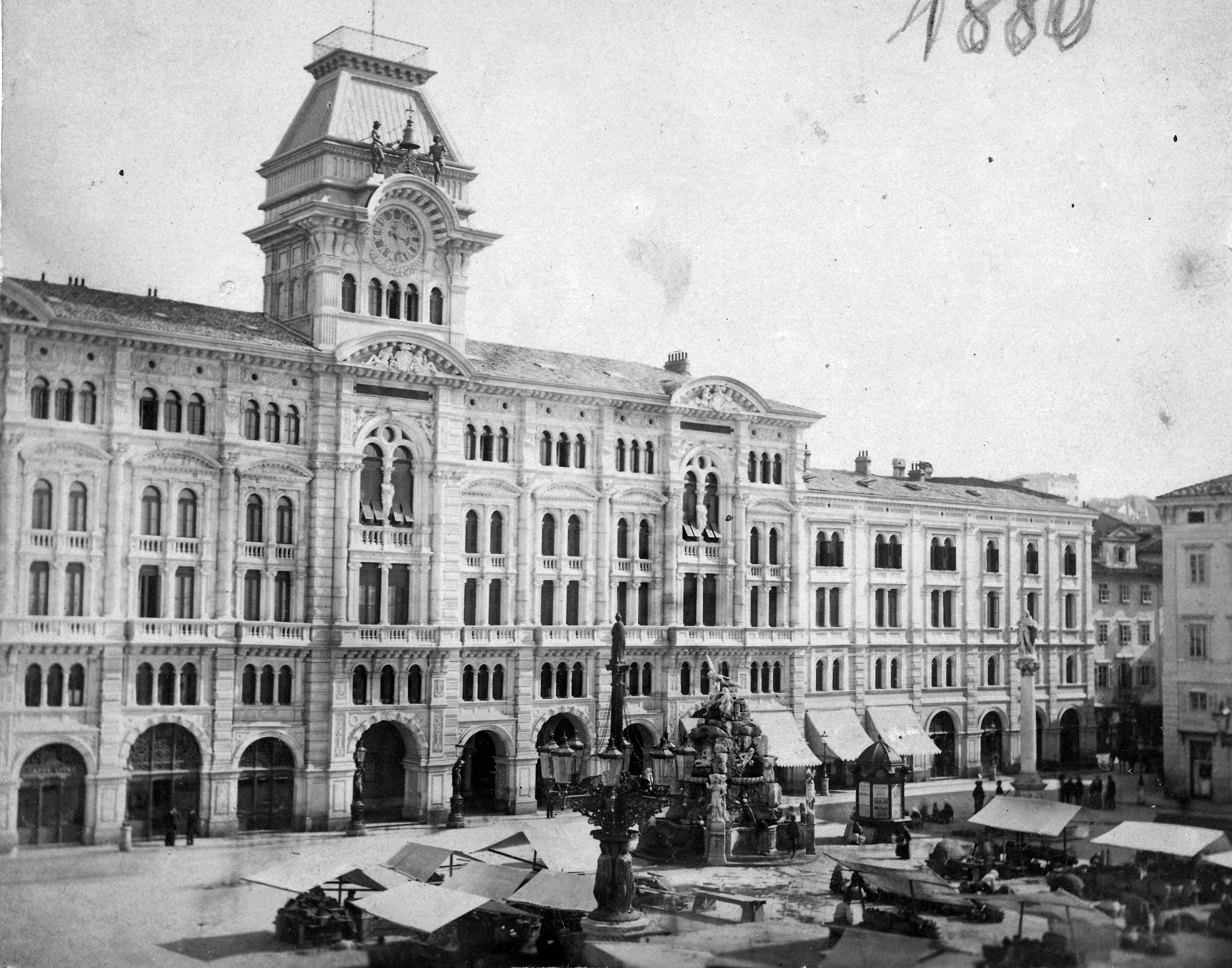
Palazzo in 1880

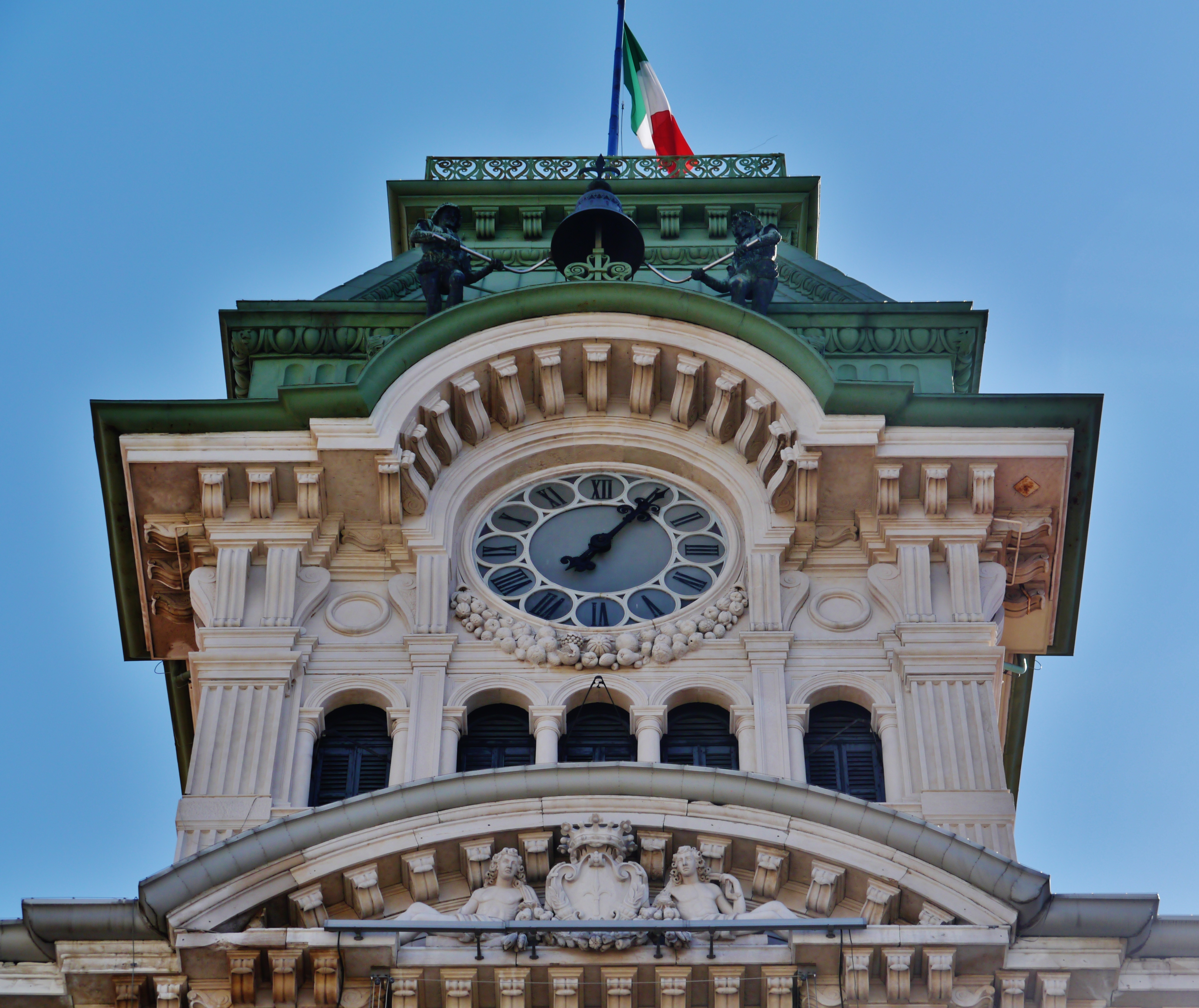
Close-up of clock tower

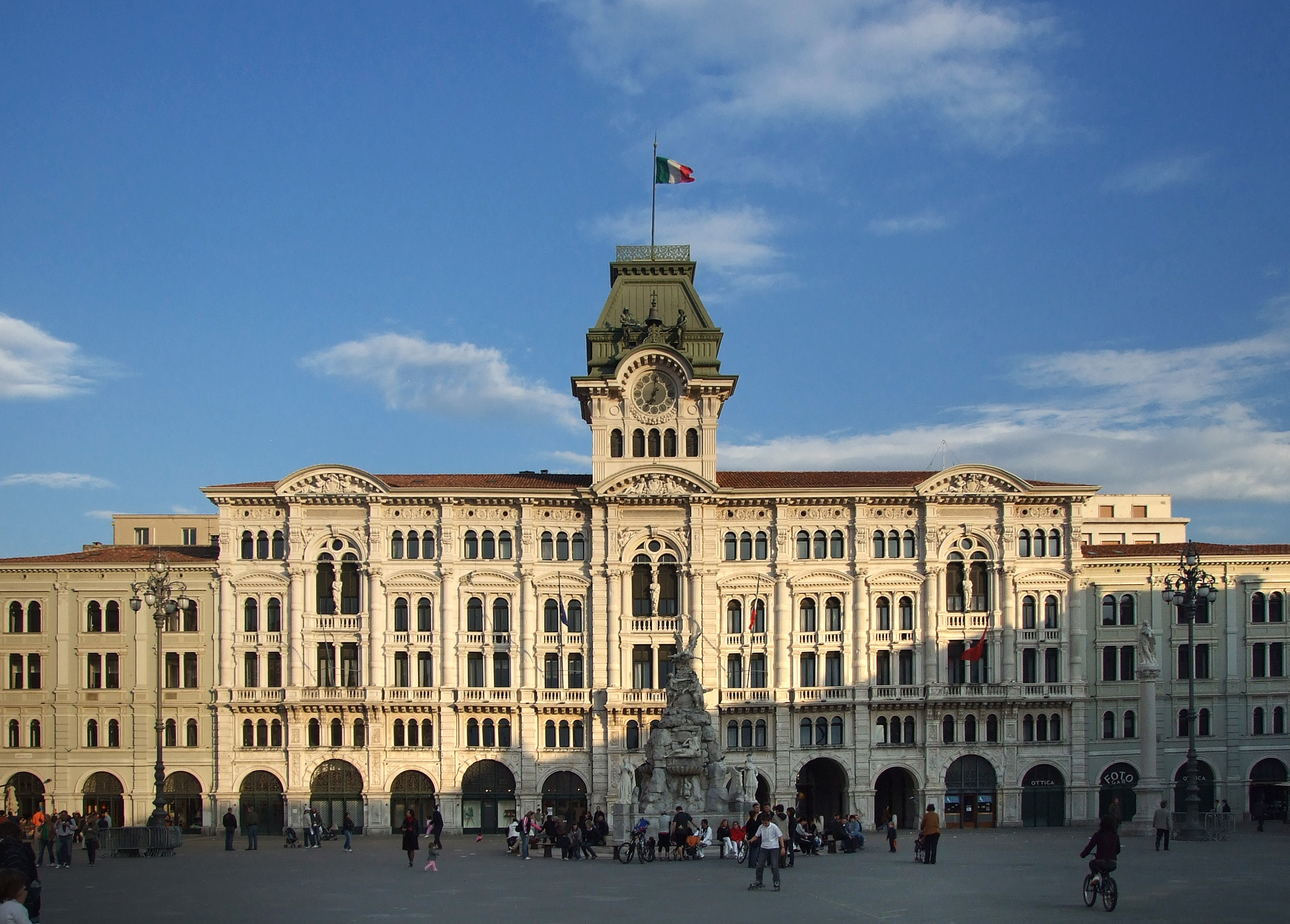
Palazzo in 2009

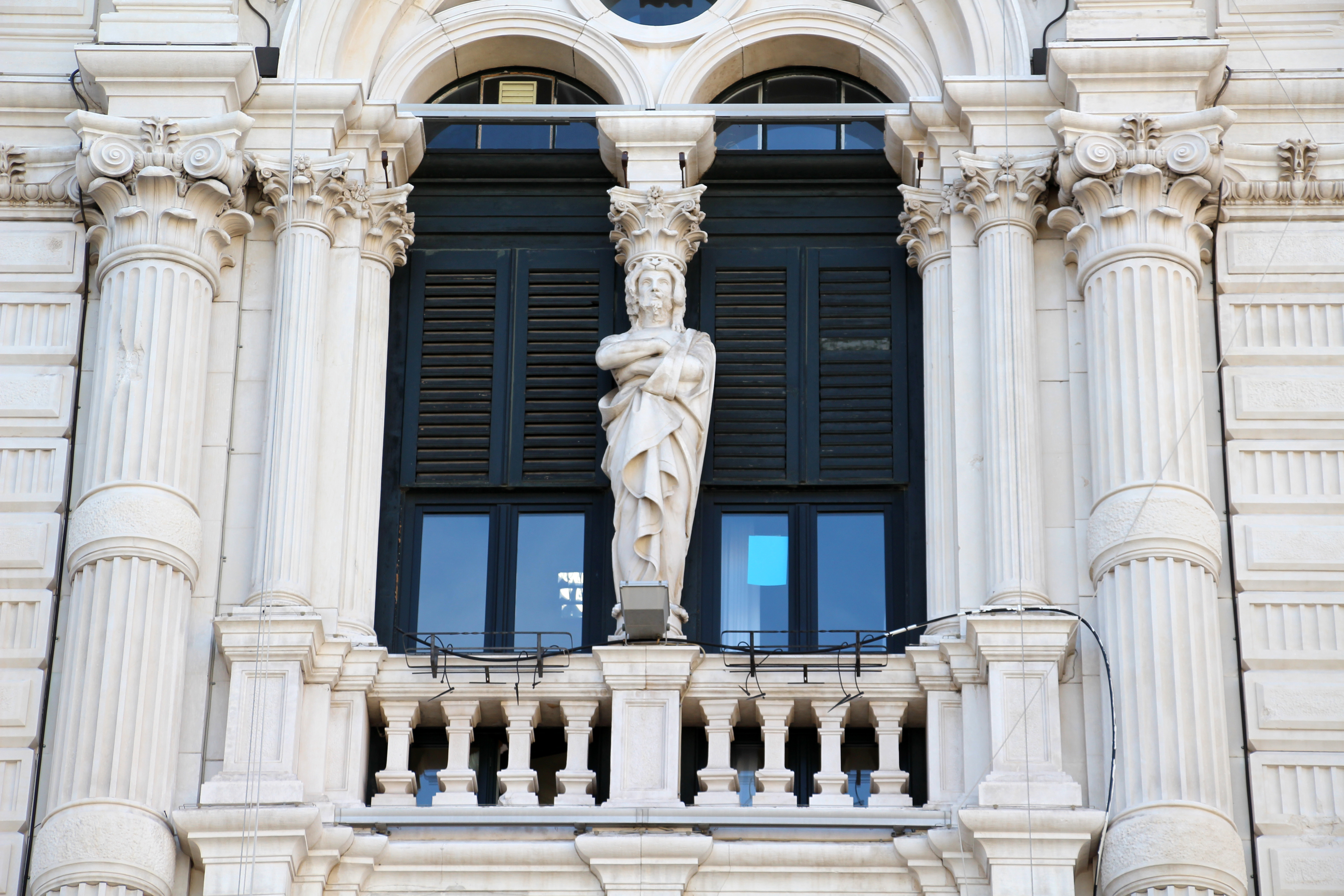
Facade details
