= Palace Modello =

Coordinates: 45.3253°N 14.4436°E

- Palazzo Modello (Italian)
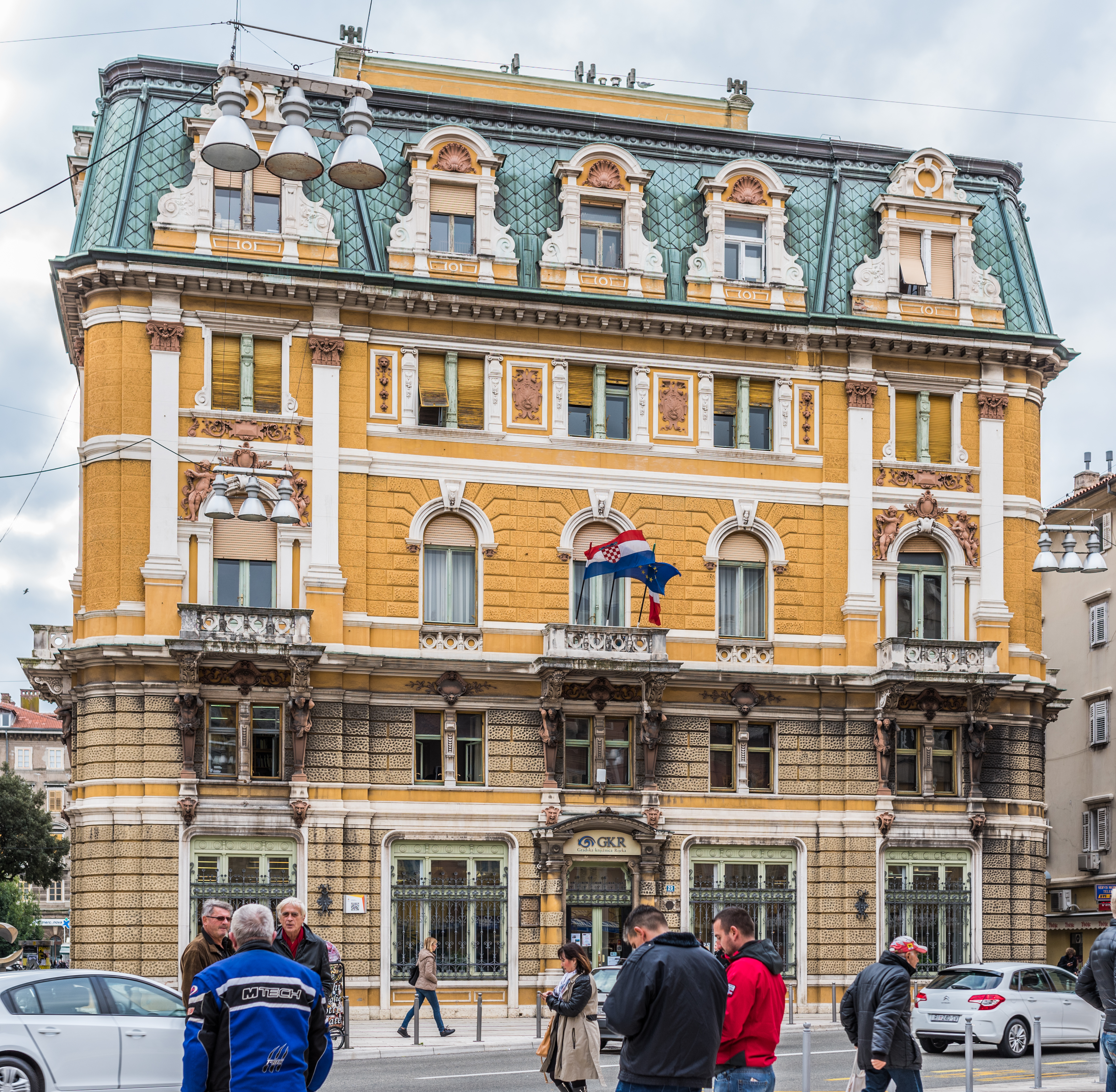
- Facade of Palace Modello from Porto street, Rijeka.
- Interactive map of Palace Modello
- Address: between Porto and Korzo streets Rijeka; Croatia
- Owner: Republic of Croatia; City of Rijeka
- Type: Bank buildings from beginning

Construction
- Opened: 1885
- Architect: Buro Fellner & Helmer

Palace Modello (Croatian: Palača Modello; Italian: Palazzo Modello) is a Baroque Revival building in Rijeka, Croatia. It was built in 1885 on the place of the destroyed and demolished Adamichev (Croatian: Adamićev) theater. The palace was designed by the Viennese buro Fellner & Helmer led by Ferdinand Fellner and Herman Helmer. Building commenced in 1883 by Rijeka Bank and completed in 1885. Modelo Palace is situated within sight of the Croatian National Theatre in honor Ivan Zajc.

The Palace Modello is one of Rijeka's most notable buildings, known for its detailed facade. It is rich in decorative elements in the style of the late renaissance and baroque. Decorative items were made by the Venetian sculptor Ignazio Donegani. The Attractive gala hall, which is now an audience of Italian Cultural Club (Italian: Comunità degli italiani di Fiume) is decorated with magnificent stucco. The public library of Rijeka city is currently operating on the ground floor.

== Gallery ==
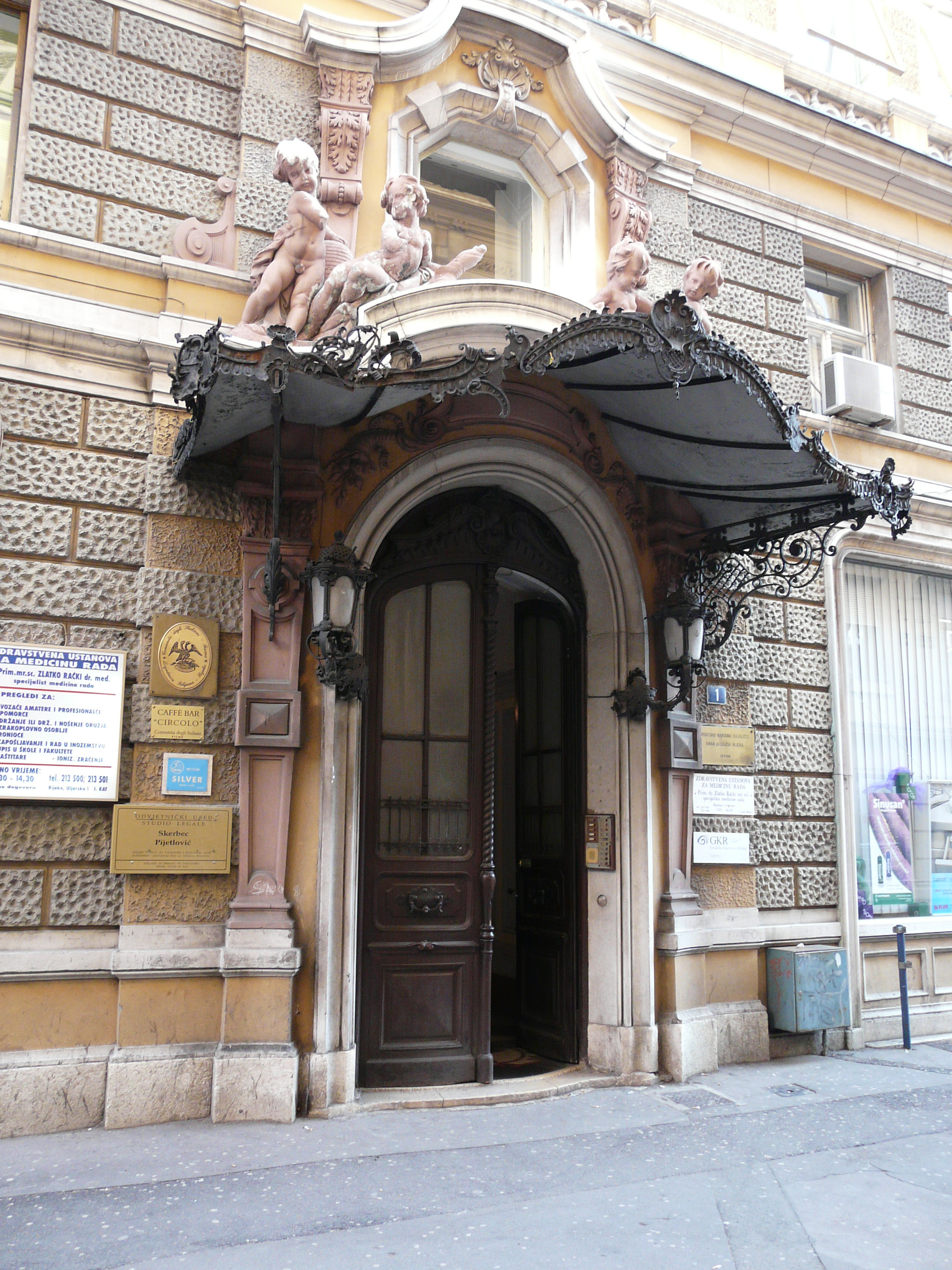
One of the entrances in the palace

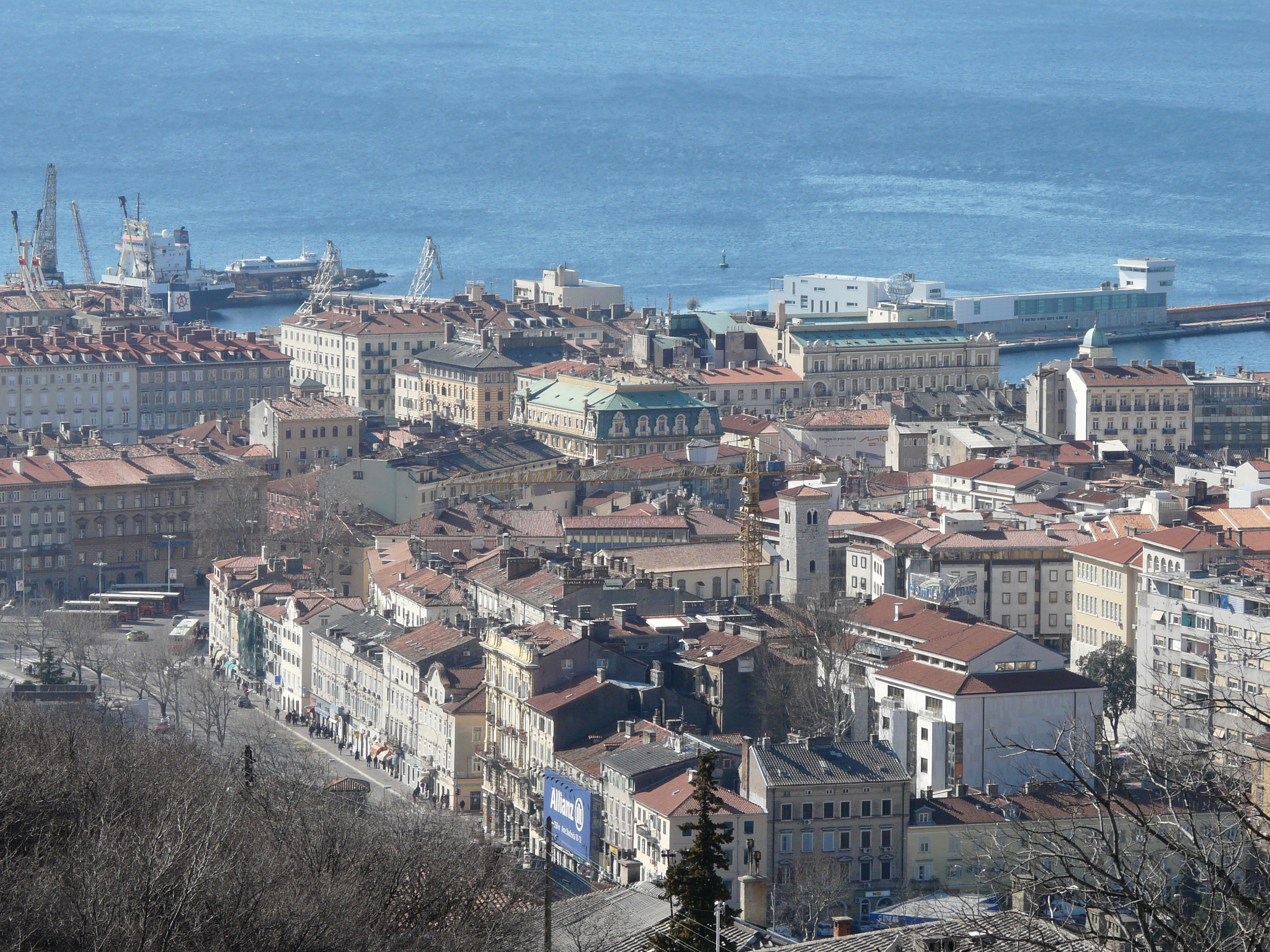
View of Rijeka roofs from Trsat. Palace Modello in the center.

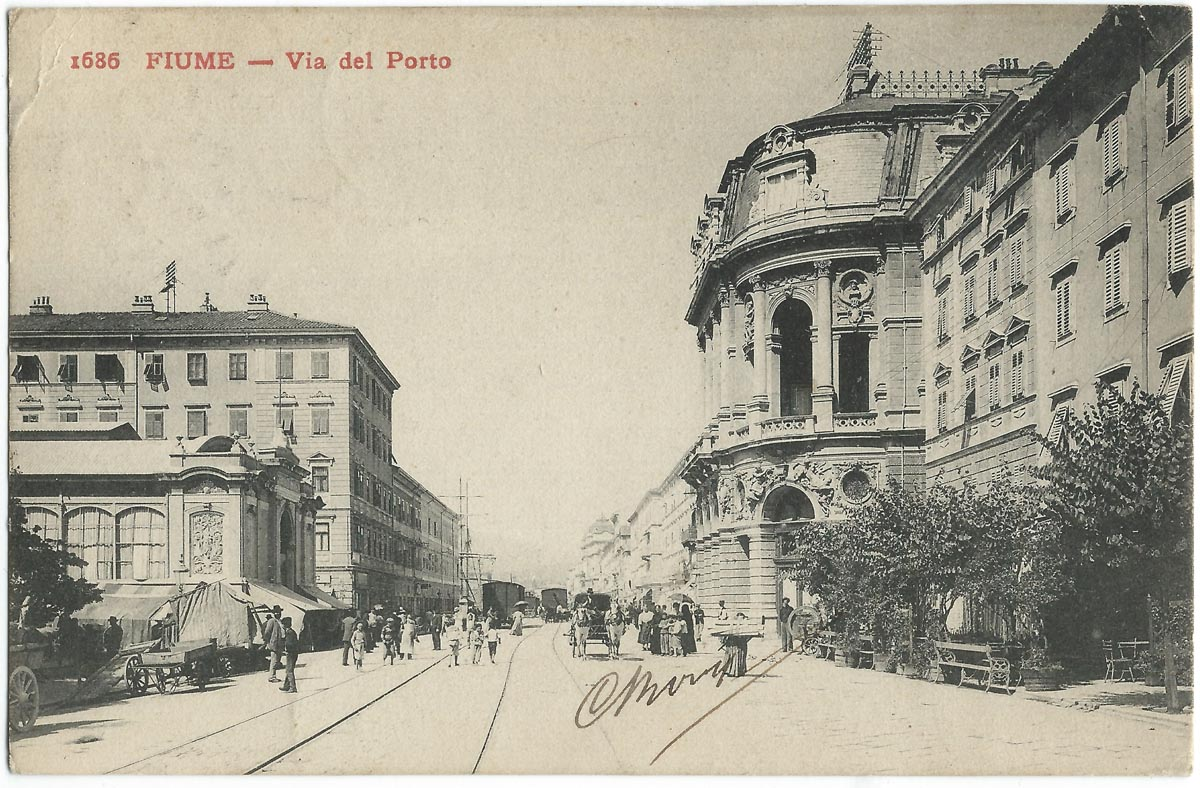
Facade of Palace Modello overlooks Porto street. 19th century.

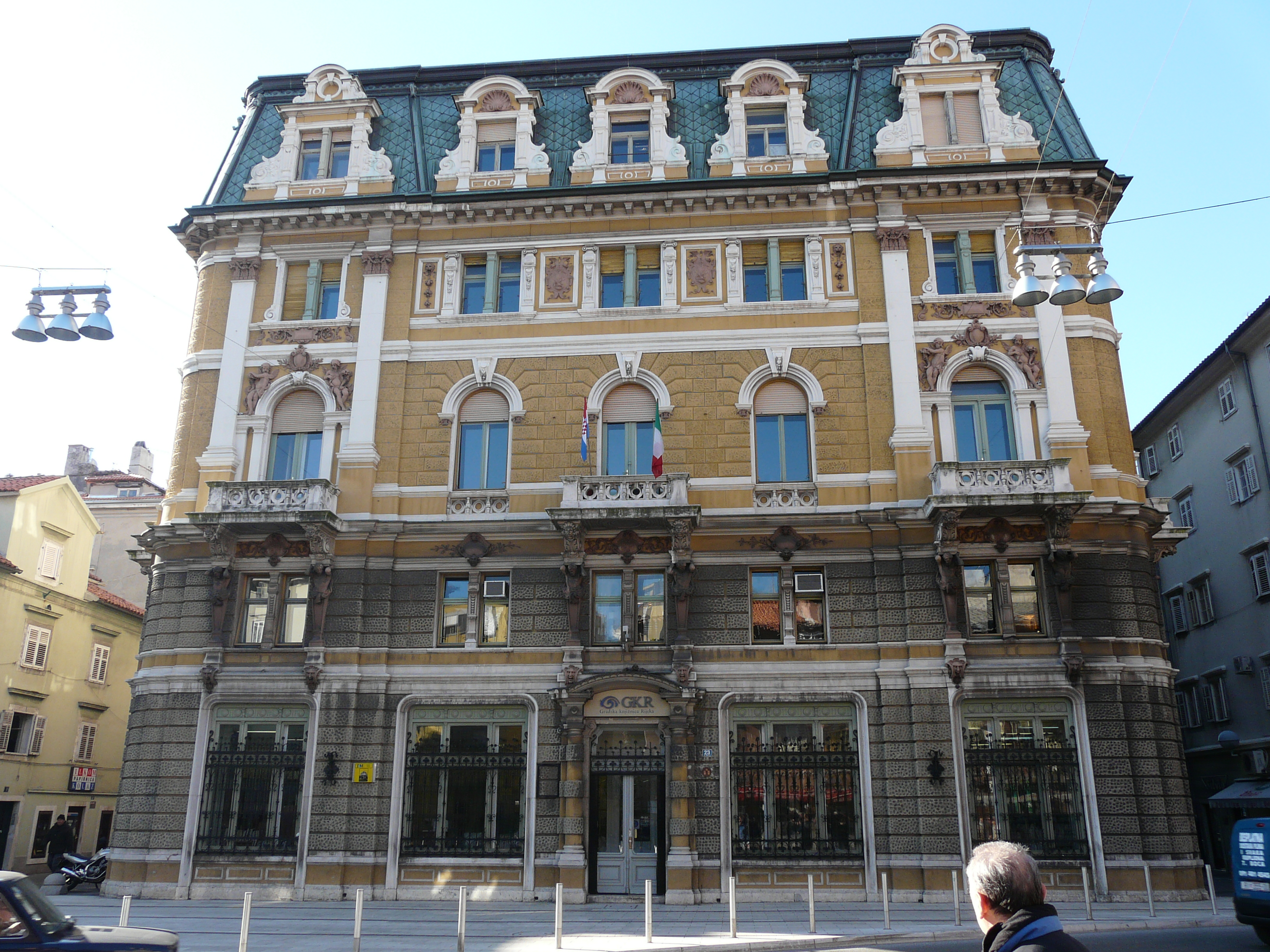
View of Palace Modello from Korzo street.

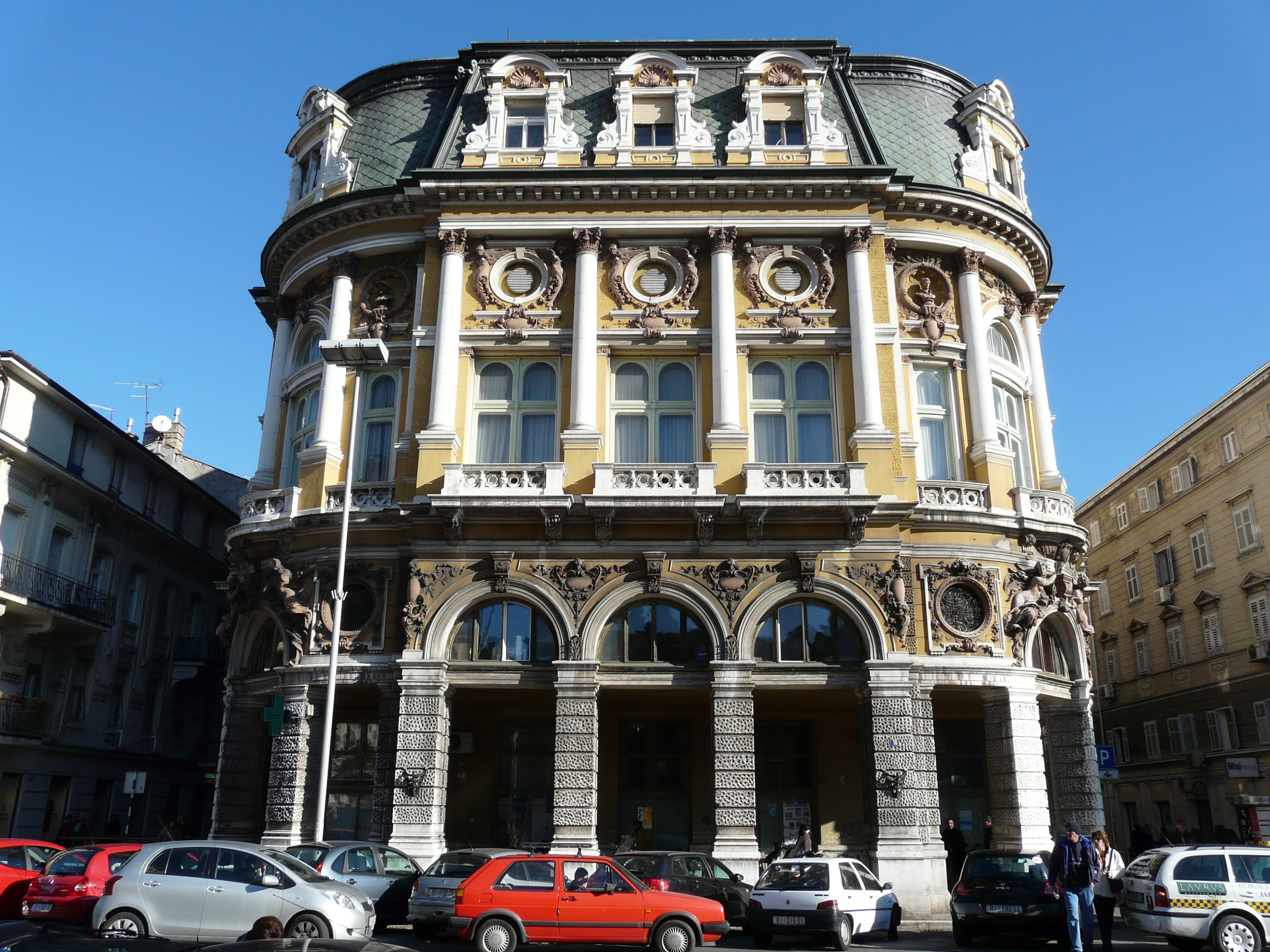
The facade of the Palace Modello from Porto street.

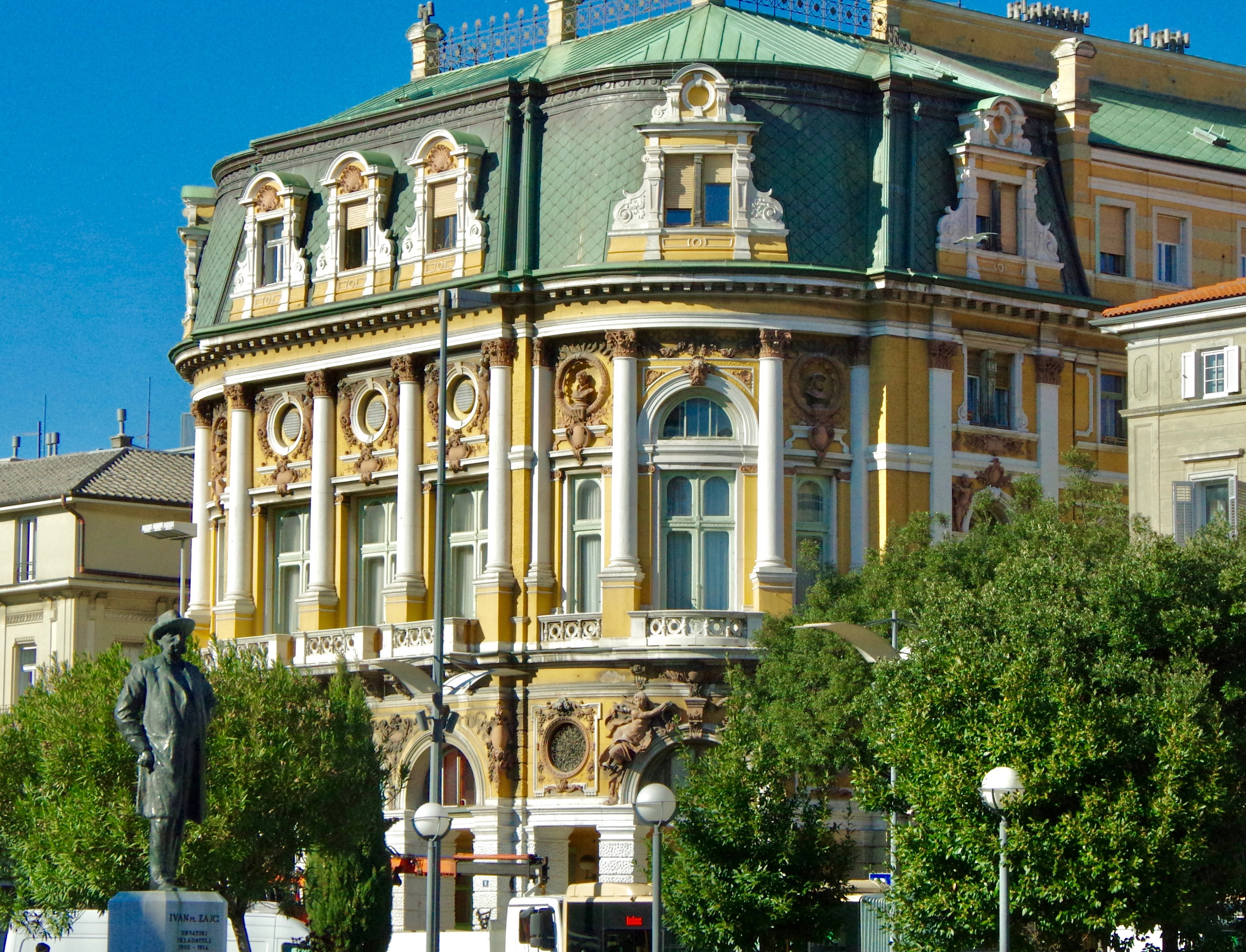
Side facade
