= European Route of Historic Theatres =

Cultural Route

The European Route of Historic Theatres is a holiday route and European Cultural Route, that runs through 120 theatres in 29 European countries. It links cities with important historic theatres from the 16th to 20th centuries.

This cultural route was initiated by the members of the organisation, Perspectiv – Association of Historic Theatres in Europe, which was founded in October 2003 with the aim of preserving the cultural heritage of historic theatres in Europe. The head offices of this association are in the town of Bad Lauchstädt and in Berlin. The project is supported by the Culture program of the European Union.

The European Route of Historic Theatres originally consisted of five individually named routes: the German Route, the Nordic Route, The Channel Route, the Italian Route and the Emperor Route. Each links between 9 and 12 towns and cities with important theatre traditions. In 2014, two more routes were added: the French and Adriatic Routes. As of 2024 a Grand Tour route in Italy and Malta is planned.

== Routes ==
=== Adriatic Route ===
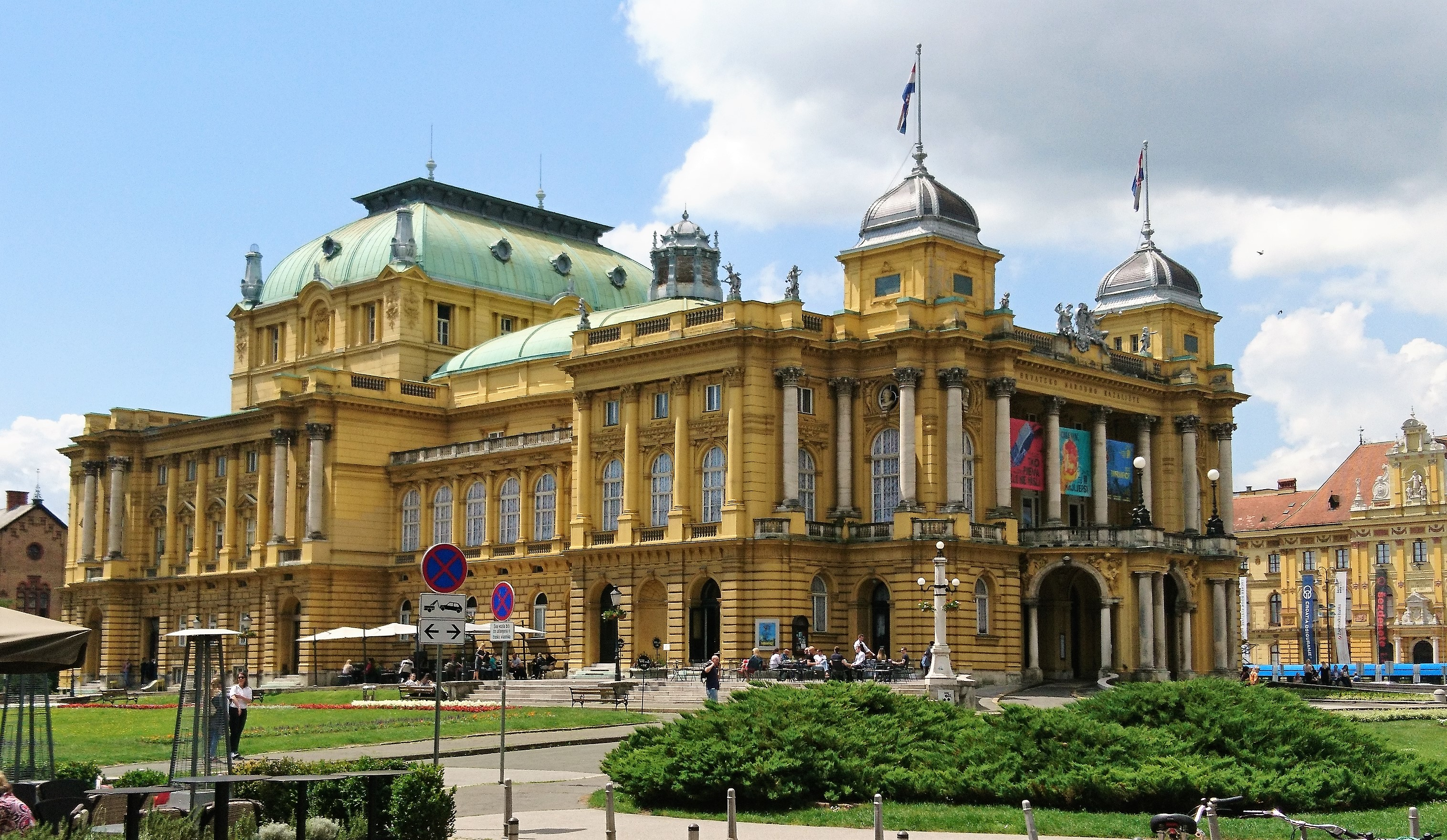
National Theatre in Zagreb

- Belgrade (Serbia) – National Theatre, 1869, rebuilt in 1922 and 1989
- Cetinje (Montenegro) – Royal Theatre Zetski Dom, 1888
- Hvar (Croatia) – Hvar Arsenal, 1612
- Ljubljana (Slovenia) – Ljubljana Slovene National Theatre Drama, 1919
- Maribor (Slovenia) – Maribor Slovene National Theatre, 1919
- Rijeka (Croatia) – Ivan Zajc Croatian National Theatre, 1885
- Sarajevo (Bosnia and Herzegovina) – Sarajevo National Theatre, 1921
- Šibenik (Croatia) – Croatian National Theatre in Šibenik, 1870
- Sombor (Serbia) – Sombor National Theatre, 1882
- Zagreb (Croatia) – Croatian National Theatre in Zagreb, 1860, reopened in a new building in 1895
- Zrenjanin (Serbia) – National Theatre "Toša Jovanović", approx. 1835

=== Alpine Route ===
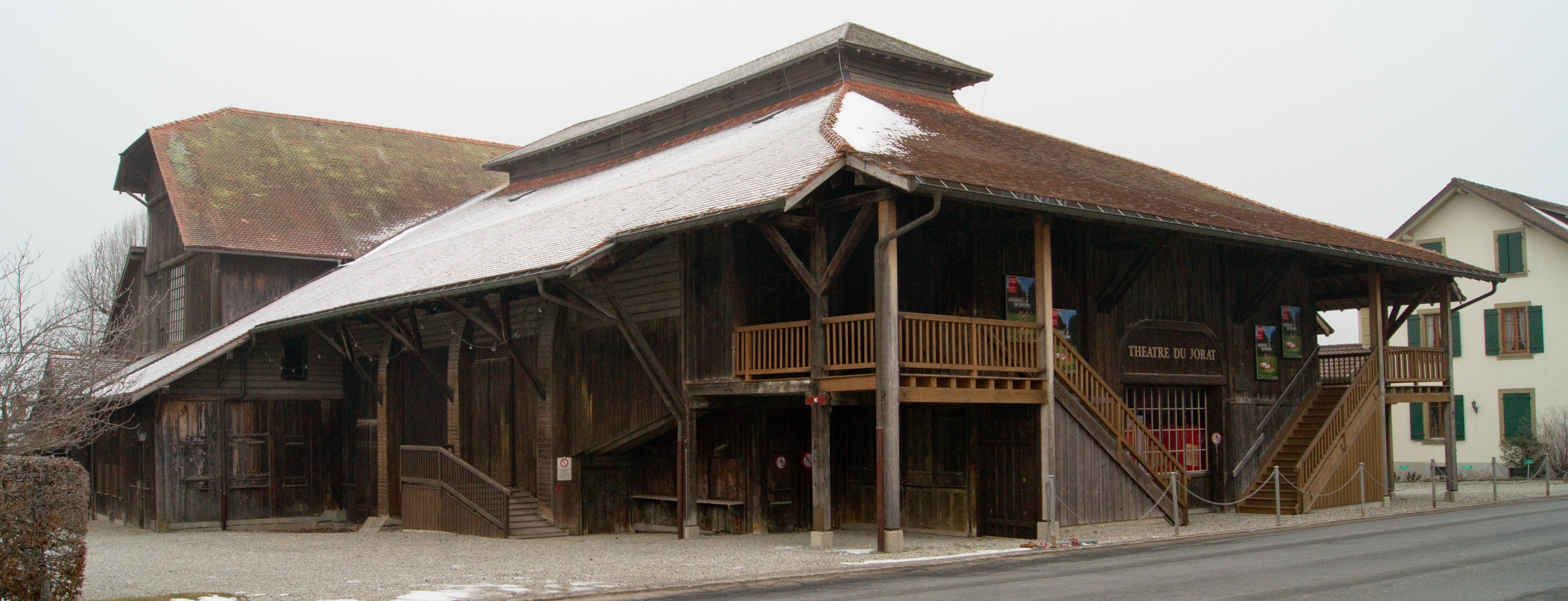
Thêatre du Jorat in Mézières

- Bellinzona (Switzerland) – Bellinzona Public Theatre, 1847
- Flintsbach (Germany) – Volkstheater, 1823
- Mézières (Switzerland) – Théâtre du Jorat, 1908
- Munich (Germany) – Prince Regent Theatre, 1901; Münchner Kammerspiele, 1906
- Ottobeuren (Germany) – Theatre Hall of Ottobeuren Abbey, 1725
- Solothurn (Switzerland) – Solothurn City Theatre

=== Baltic Route ===
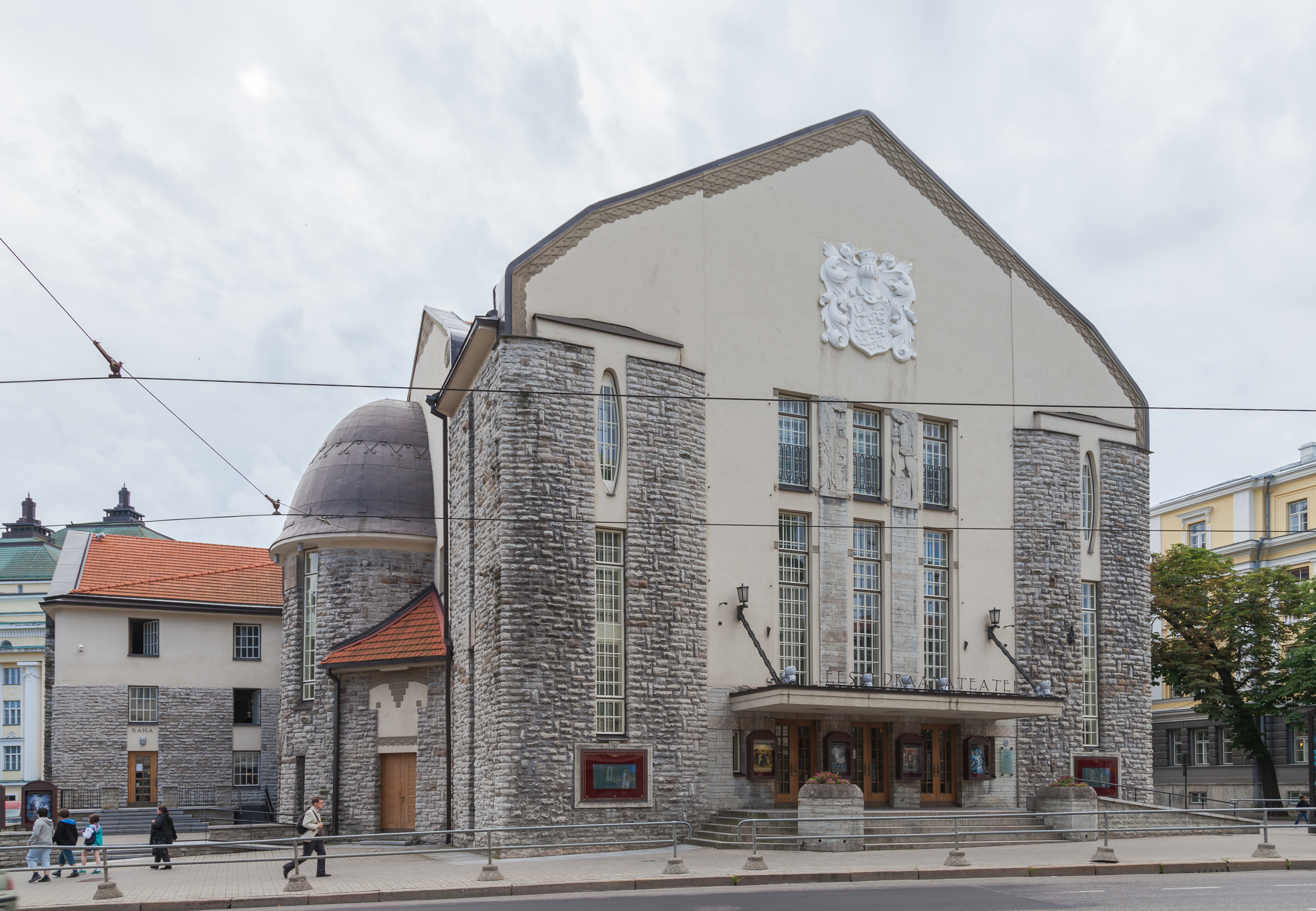
Estonian Drama Theatre in Tallinn

- Cieszyn (Poland) – Adam Mickiewicz Theatre, 1910
- Kraków (Poland) – Juliusz Słowacki Theatre, 1893
- Riga (Latvia) – Latvian National Opera, 1863; Latvian National Theatre, 1902
- Tallinn (Estonia) – Estonian Drama Theatre, 1924
- Tartu (Estonia) – Little house of Vanemuine, 1906
- Vilnius (Lithuania) – Old Theatre of Vilnius, 1913
- Warsaw (Poland) – Stanisławowski Theatre, 18th century, reopened in 2017
- Łańcut (Poland) – Theatre in the Castle Museum, 1792

=== Black Sea Route ===
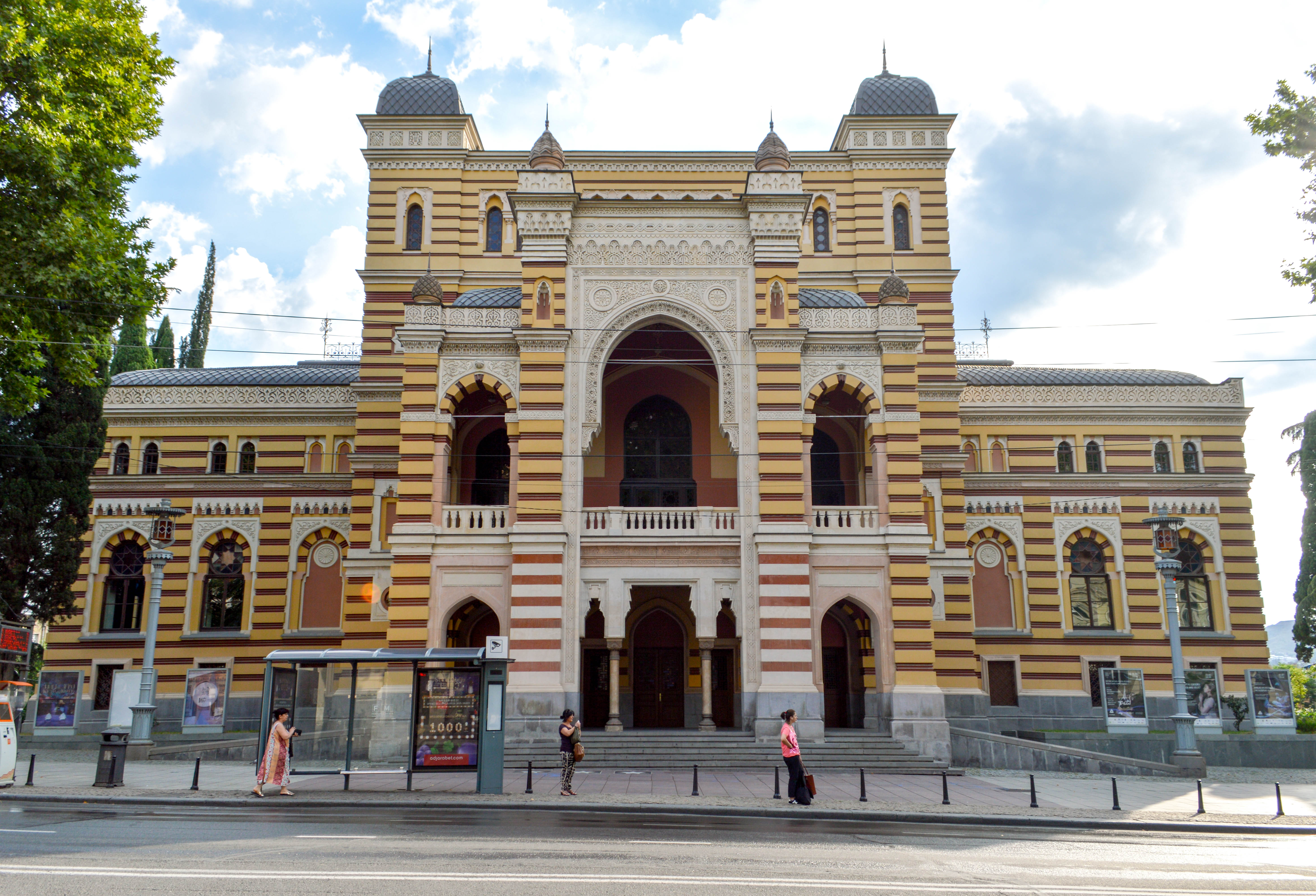
National Opera House in Tbilisi

- Bucharest (Romania) – Odeon Theatre, 1911
- Chernivtsi (Ukraine) – Olha Kobylianska Drama Theatre, 1905
- Iași (Romania) – Vasile Alecsandri National Theatre, 1896
- Odesa (Ukraine) – Odesa Opera and Ballet Theatre, 1887
- Oradea (Romania) – Oradea National Theatre, 1900
- Oravița (Romania) – Mihai Eminesku Theatre, 1817
- Sofia (Bulgaria) – Ivan Vazov National Theatre, 1907
- Tbilisi (Georgia) – Georgian National Opera Theater, 1896

=== Channel Route ===
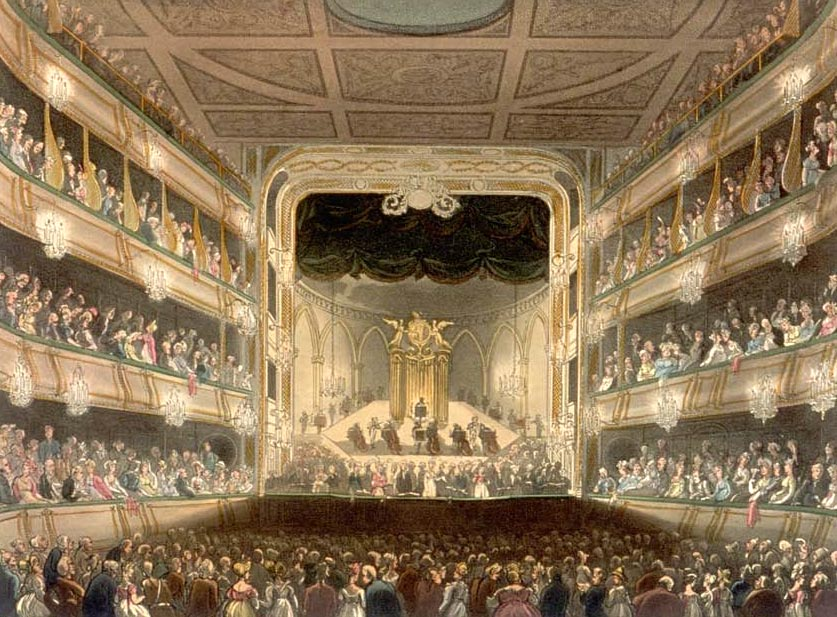
The Royal Opera House (1808 Illustration)

- Chimay (Belgium) – Théâtre du château, built 1861 to 1863 by French architect and stage designer, Charles-Antoine Cambon (1802–1875), based on the first palace theatre at Fontainebleau. → linke to the German Route via Koblenz.
- Ghent (Belgium) – Opera, opened in 1840 as a luxurious opera house financed by industrialists.
- Brussels (Belgium) – Théâtre Royal du Parc, built in 1782 in the English style as an extension of a vauxhall, a pleasure garden with a café. It was erected in the open at the side of the park. Its architect was Louis Montoyer.
- Leiden (Netherlands) – Schouwburg, one of the first public theatres in Holland, built in 1705 by actor, Jacob van Rijndorp, and expanded in 1865 by architect, Jan Willem Schaap.
- Bury St Edmunds (England) – The Theatre Royal, built in 1819 by the architect William Wilkins as a Neoclassicist theatre in the Regency style.
- London (England) – The 1732 Theatre Royal and present Royal Opera House in Covent Garden and the Theatre Royal Drury Lane; the Theatre Royal in Covent Garden was converted in 1848 into an opera house, the building dates to 1858; Royal Drury Lane opened in 1663, the present theatre dates to 1812, and the auditorium to 1922.
- Craig-y-Nos (Wales) – Adelina Patti Theatre, the soprano, Adelina Patti, had her private theatre built in 1891 by architects, Bucknall & Jennings.
- Nottingham (England) – The Malt Cross, a historic theatre and music hall, today a cafe and bar that holds cultural events.
- Richmond (England) – Georgian Theatre Royal, municipal theatre and theatre museum, opened in 1788, closed in 1848 and re-opened in 1963, best preserved theatre from the Georgian period.

=== Emperor Route ===
The Emperor Route was established in 2013 and runs through the Czech Republic (especially Bohemia) and Austria. These two countries were ruled by the emperors from the Habsburg dynasty until 1918, hence the name of this route.

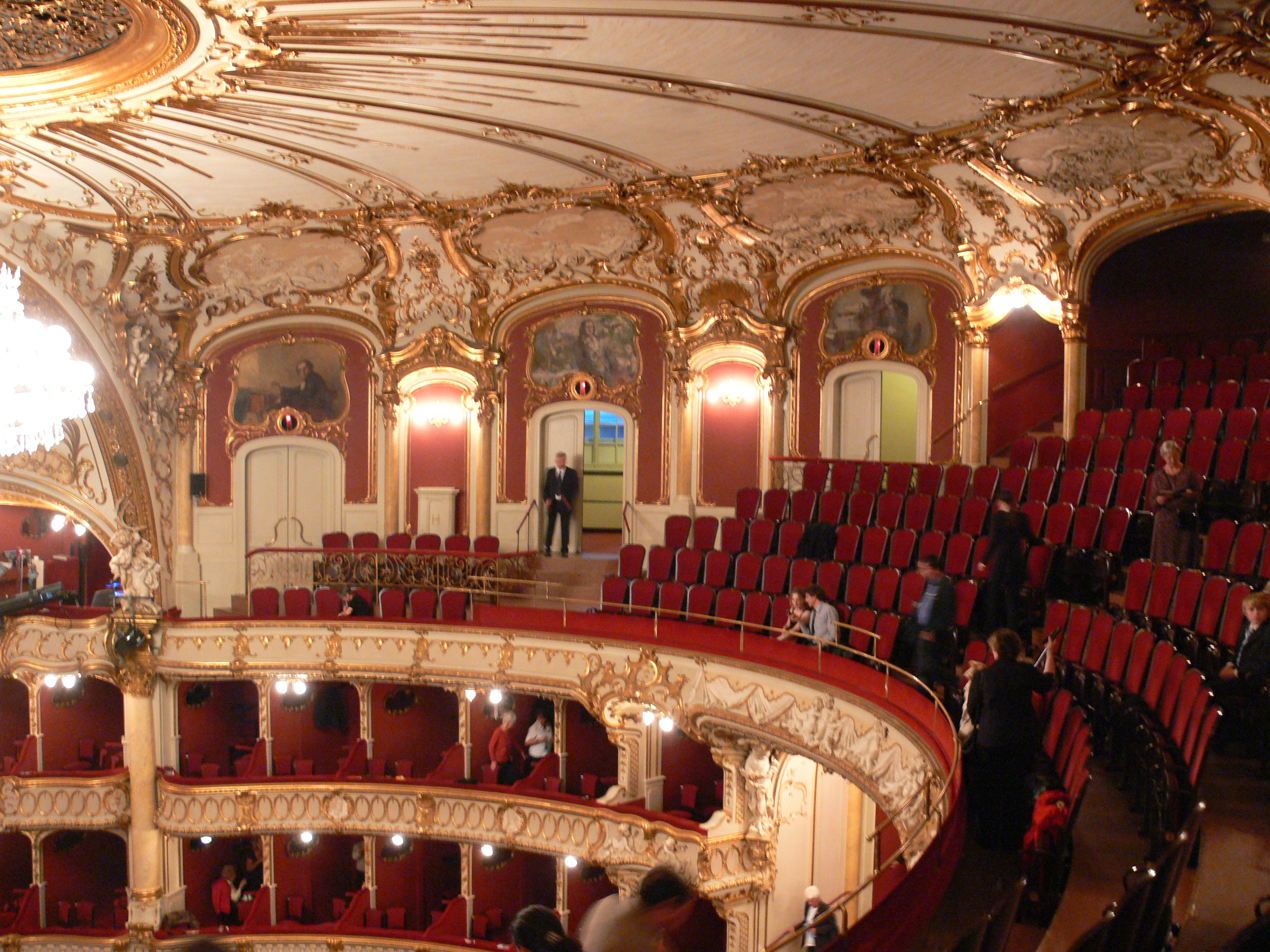
Graz Opera House, galleries

- Graz (Austria) – Graz Opera House, built in 1899 by architects Fellner & Helmer, and the Schauspielhaus Graz (1779/1825/1965), where three eras are united.
- Vienna (Austria) – Theatre an der Wien dating to 1801, where many important events in Austrian theatre history took and still take place.
- Grein (Austria) – Stadttheater Grein (1791), the oldest public theatre in Austria.
- Weitra (Austria) – Castle Theatre, built in 1885, Saaltheater mit Wiener Einfluss.
- Český Krumlov (Czech Republic) – Castle theatre dating to 1768, UNESCO World Heritage Site, fully preserved Baroque theatre.
- Litomyšl (Czech Republic) – Fully preserved castle theatre dating to 1798, integrated into a 1581 Renaissance palace, UNESCO World Heritage Site.
- Kačina (Czech Republic) – 1851 Classicist building, the castle theatre is still equipped with its original stage technology and wings from the 19th century.
- Mnichovo Hradiště (Czech Republic) – The Castle Theatre, site of the Three Emperors' Meeting in the Holy Alliance of 1833, fully preserved.
- Prague (Czech Republic) – The Estates Theatre (1783/1859) represents 200 years of Czech and German theatre history in Bohemia. The world premiere of Mozart's opera Don Giovanni took place here in 1787.

=== French Route ===
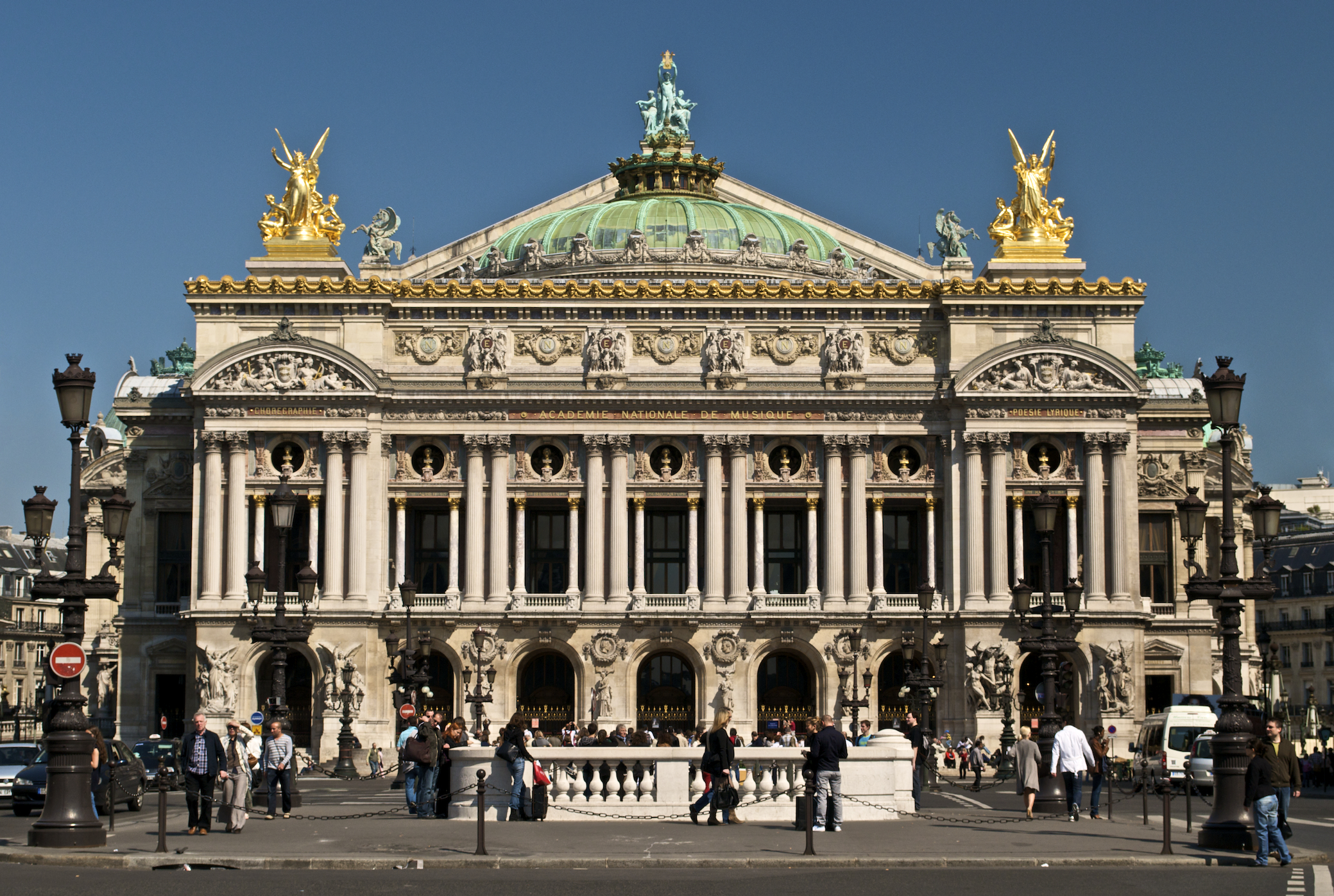
Garnier Opera in Paris

- Bordeaux – Grand-Théâtre, 1780
- Bussang – Théâtre du Peuple, 1895
- Fontainebleau – Fontainebleau Imperial Theatre, 1857
- Le Creusot – Small Theatre of Château de la Verrerie, 1786
- Lyon – Théâtre des Célestins, 1877
- Nohant – George Sand Marionette Theater, 1876
- Paris – Odéon, 1782; Théâtre du Châtelet, 1862; Opéra Garnier, 1875; Théâtre Le Ranelagh, 1900
- Pézenas – Municipal Theatre, 1803
- Versailles – Théâtre Montansier, 1777

=== German Route ===
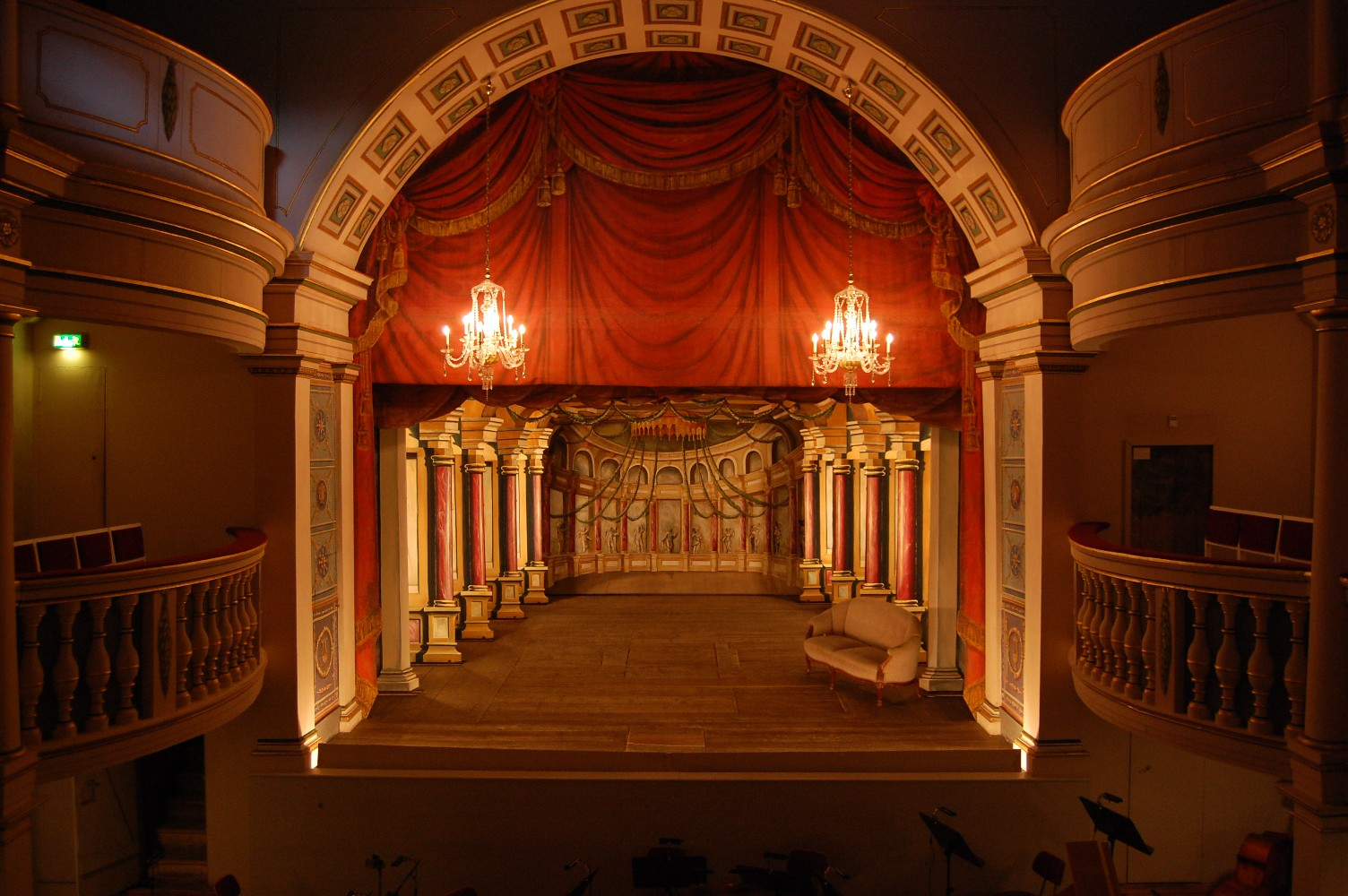
Stage of the Ekhof Theatre

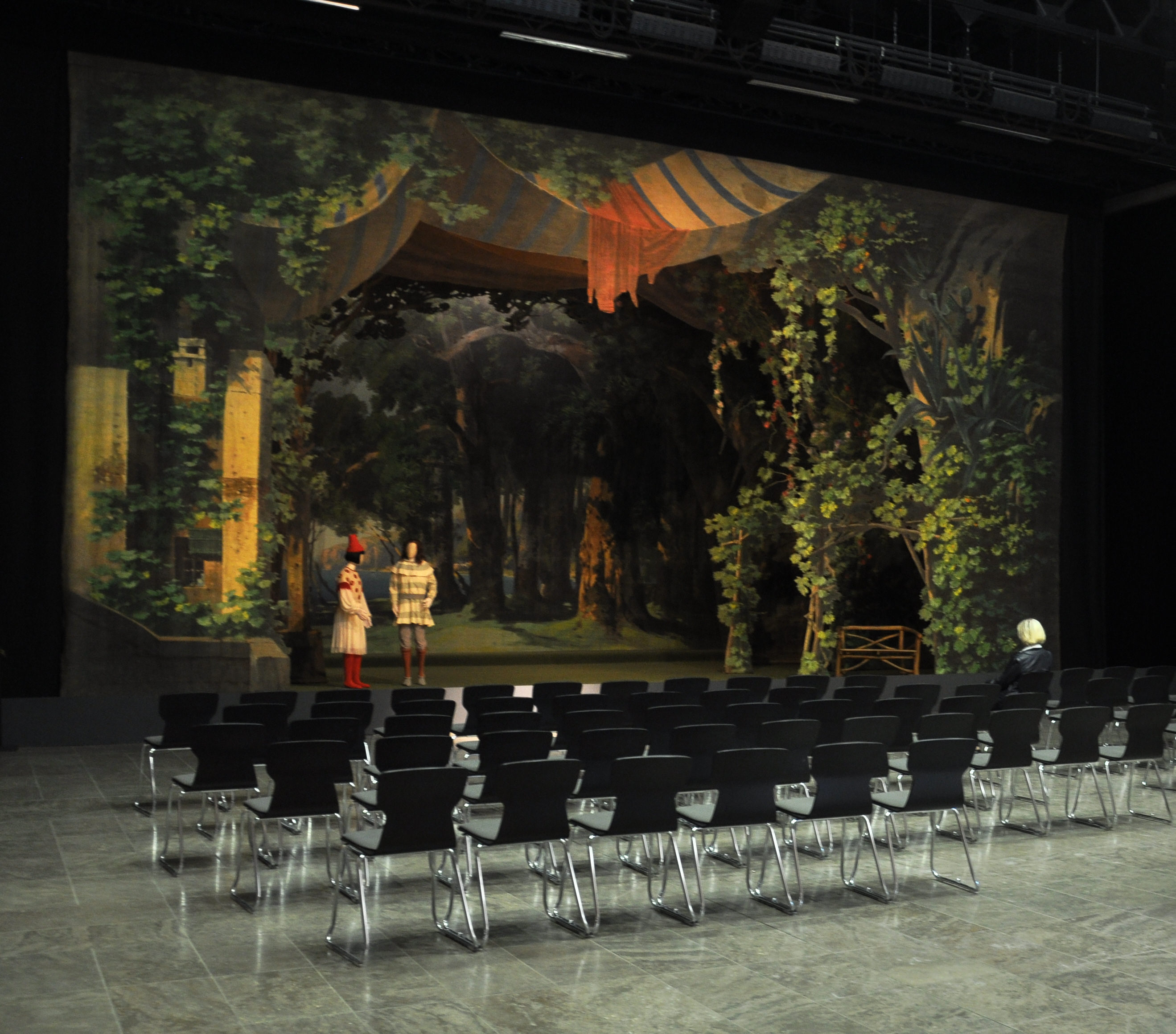
Meiningen Theatre Museum, setting: The Winter’s Tale

- Putbus – Putbus Theatre, opened in 1821 and converted in 1826 into the North German Classicist style, → links to the Nordic Route via Rønne (Bornholm).
- Neubrandenburg – The Schauspielhaus, a baroque timber-framed building with cob brickwork dating to 1793/94, built as a summer venue for the court theatre of Duke Adolphus Frederick IV of Mecklenburg-Strelitz.
- Potsdam – Rococo Theatre in the New Palace in Sanssouci Park, built from 1763 to 1769 under the Prussian king, Frederick II.
- Bad Lauchstädt – Goethe Theatre, Johann Wolfgang von Goethe had this theatre built in 1802 to his concepts as a summer playhouse.
- Großkochberg – The Liebhaber Theatre in Kochberg Castle dating to 1800, former seat of Charlotte von Stein.
- Gotha – Ekhof Theatre, was built from 1681 to 1683 in a corner tower at Friedenstein Castle and may still be seen its original 1775 setting. It is reckoned as the first of the modern German theatres.
- Meiningen – Theatre Museum and Court Theatre, important surviving theatre reform under Duke George II, first court theatre built in 1831, the present one in 1909, architect: Karl Behlert; Theatre Museum (since 1999) with scenery from the reform period.
- Bayreuth – Margravial Opera House, Margravine Wilhelmine had the opera house built in 1746–50, the exterior in the French Classicist style, the interior in the Italian Baroque, designed by Giuseppe Galli da Bibiena, → link to the Emperor Route (from 2011).
- Ludwigsburg – The Palace Theatre in Ludwigsburg Palace. It was built in 1758 by Philippe de la Guêpière for Duke Charles Eugene of Württemberg. In 1812 the auditorium was converted into the Classicist style, was played until 1853 and is still fully preserved today.
- Schwetzingen – Rococo theatre, built in 1752/53 by the architect Nicolas de Pigage, oldest surviving Rangtheater in Europe.
- Hanau – Comoedienhaus Wilhelmsbad, at the former spa of Wilhelmsbad, opened on 8 July 1781, built to plans by Franz Ludwig von Cancrin.
- Koblenz – Koblenz Theatre, Elector and Bishop Clemens Wenceslaus of Saxony had a comedy, opera, ballroom and assembly house built which was inaugurated on 23 November 1787 → link to the Channel Route via Chimay.

=== Iberia Route ===
Theatro Circo in Braga

- Almagro (Spain) – Corral de comedias de Almagro, the last open-air theatre in Spain, 1628, reopened in 1954
- Bilbao (Spain) – Arriaga Theatre, 1890
- Braga (Portugal) – Theatre Circo, 1915
- Burgos (Spain) – Teatro Principal, 1858
- Cadiz (Spain) – Gran Teatro Falla, 1905
- Evora (Portugal) – Teatro Garcia de Resende, 1892
- Faro (Portugal) – Teatro Lethes, 1605, inaugurated as a theatre in 1845
- Lisbon (Portugal) – National Theater of São Carlos, 1793
- Madrid (Spain) – Teatro Español, established in 1585, reopened in a new building in 1895
- Mahon (Spain) – Teatro Principal, one of the oldest opera houses in Spain, 1829
- San Lorenzo de El Escorial (Spain) – Teatro Real Coliseo de Carlos III, one of the oldest preserved covered theaters in Spain, 1772
- Toledo (Spain) – Teatro Rojas, 1879

=== North Italian Route ===
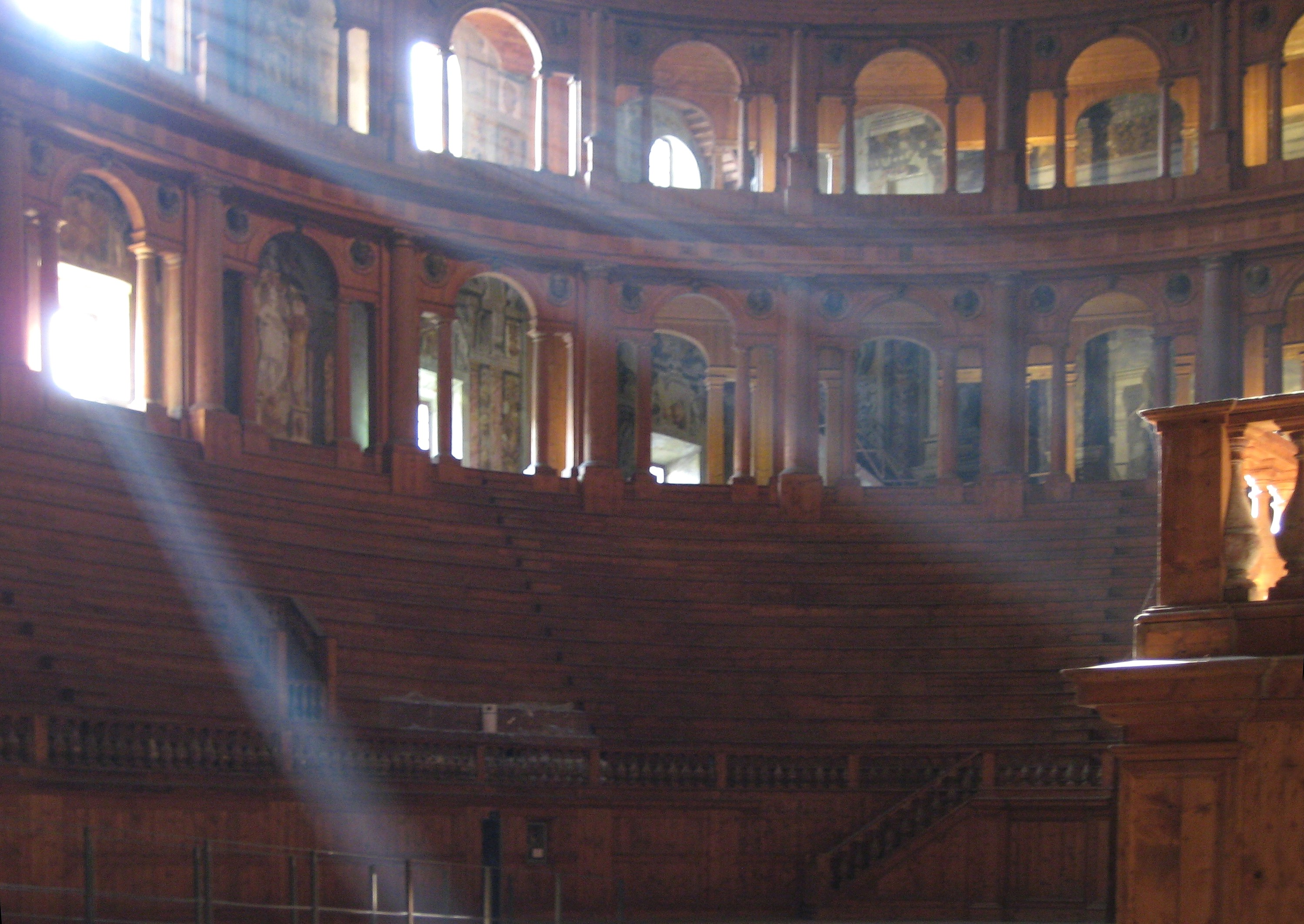
Auditorium of the Teatro Farnese

- Bologna – Municipal Theatre, was opened on 14 May 1763 based on the altered plans of architect Antonio Galli da Bibiena; Theatre of the Villa Aldrovandi Mazzacorati, small theatre in a preserved villa, opened on 24 September 1763
- Carpi – Municipal Theatre, built in 1861, typical Italian box seat theatre
- Cesena – Alessandro Bonci Theatre, Neoclassicist building, built between 1843 and 1846 by architect Vincenzo Ghinelli
- Faenza – Masini Municipal Theatre, internal court of the Piazza del Popolo, built in 1788 by architect Giuseppe Pistocchi
- Mantua – Teatro Bibiena, built from 1767 to 1769 for the Accademia Nazionale Virgiliana to plans by Antonio Galli da Bibiena
- Parma – Teatro Farnese on the Palazzo della Pilotta, built 1617/18 by Giovanni Battista Aleotti
- Sabbioneta – Teatro all'antica, first free-standing theatre of the Modern Era, built from 1588 to 1590 by architect Vincenzo Scamozzi based on the Teatro Olimpico in Vicenza
- San Giovanni in Persiceto – Municipal Theatre, in 1626 a hall was built as a theatre, in 1659 it was converted to a theatre with box seats, in 1790 it was replaced by an auditorium by architect Giuseppe Tubertini
- Vicenza – Teatro Olimpico, the first covered theatre of the Modern Period in Europe, 1580

=== Nordic Route ===
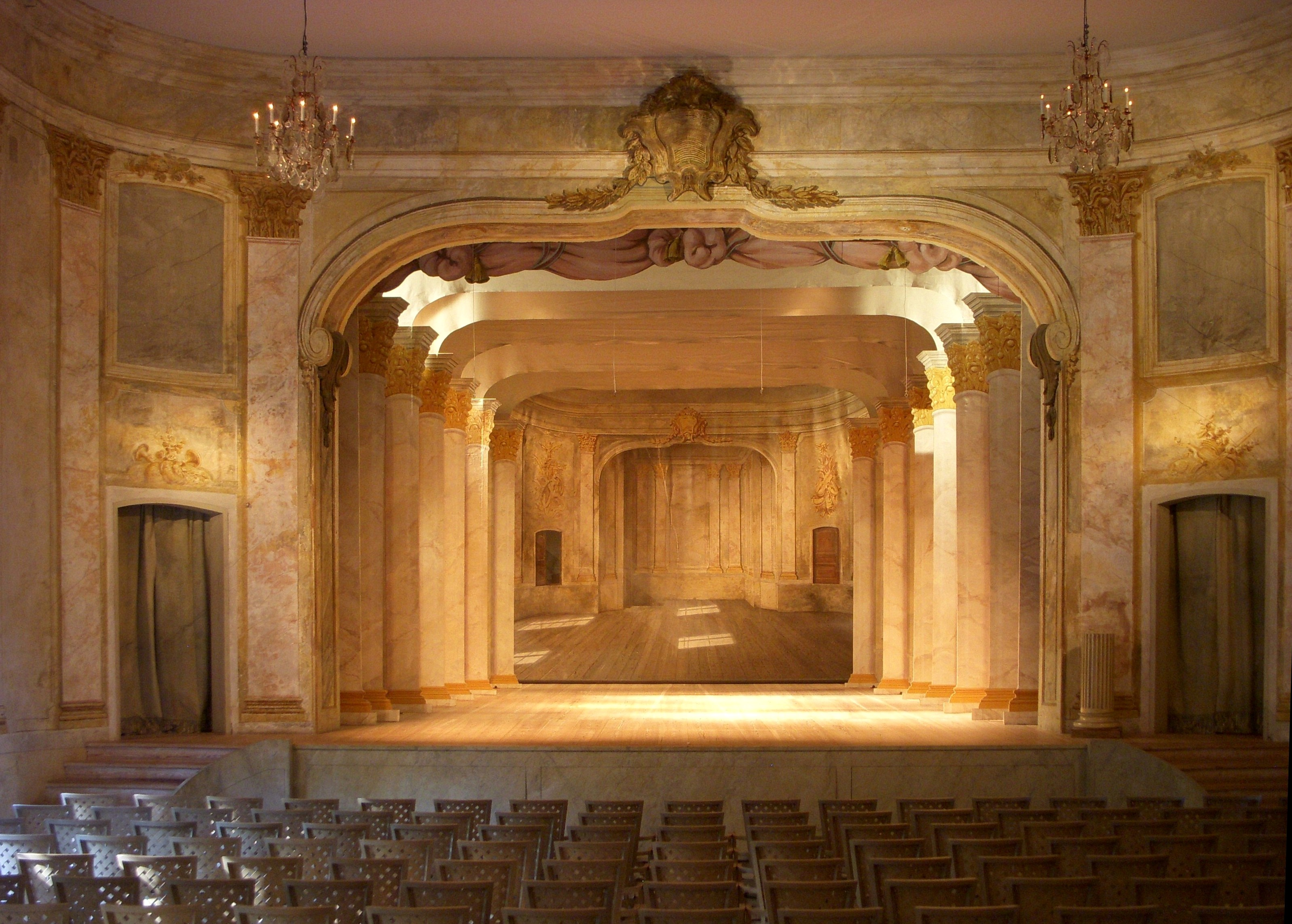
The auditorium and stage in the Confidencen (2011)

- Drottningholm, near Stockholm (Sweden) – Drottningholm Palace Theatre built in 1766 by Carl Fredrik Adelcrantz.
- Solna (Sweden) – Confidencen, the oldest rococo theatre in Sweden is in Ulriksdal Palace. It was built in 1753 by the architect, Carl Fredrik Adelcrantz.
- Mariefred (Sweden) – Gripsholms Slottsteater, 1785.
- Turku (Finland) – Åbo Svenska Teater, 1836/1890s.
- Helsinki (Finland) – Svenska Teatern, 1866.
- Ystad (Sweden) – restored municipal theatre of 1894, large collection of scenery by Swedish theatre artist, Carl Ludvig Grabow.
- Halden (Norway) – Fredrikshald Theatre, built in 1838 to plans by Balthazar Nicolai Garben.
- Aarhus (Denmark) – Helsingör Theatre; the building dates to the year 1817 and was originally in Helsingør. In 1961 it was dismantled and rebuilt at the Den Gamle By Open Air Museum.
- Copenhagen (Denmark) – Court Theatre in Christiansborg Palace, a work by architect, Elias David Häusser, built from 1733 to 1745.
- Hedemora (Sweden) – Teaterladan (The barn theatre), 1826/29.
