= Olha Kobylianska Chernivtsi Drama Theatre =

Drama theatre in Chernivtsi, Ukraine

Olha Kobylianska Chernivtsi Academic Regional Ukrainian Music and Drama Theatre
- Чернівецький академічний обласний український музично-драматичний театр імені Ольги Кобилянської

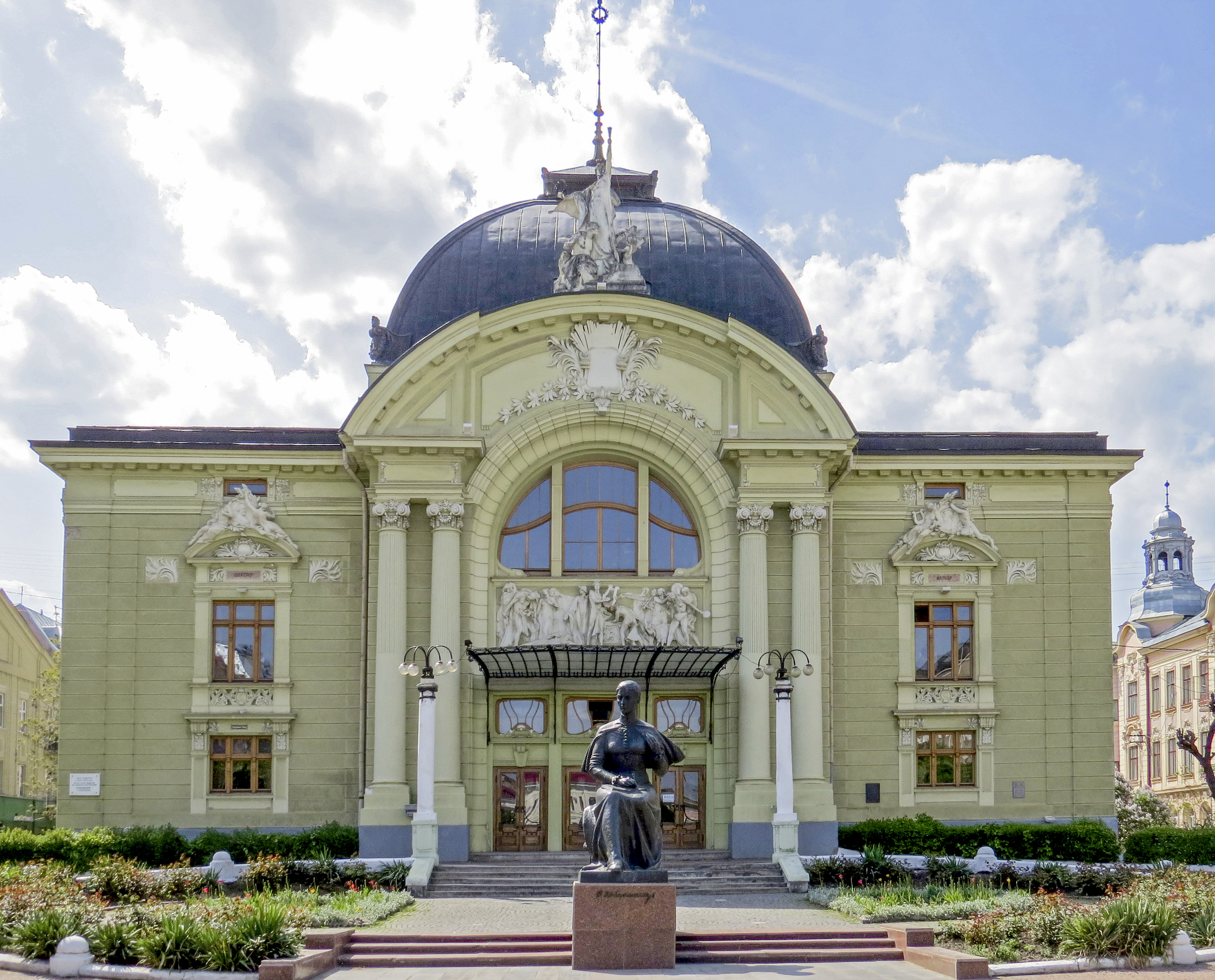
- The Theater as seen from Teatralna Square
- Interactive map of Olha Kobylianska Chernivtsi Academic Regional Ukrainian Music and Drama Theatre
- Former names: Czernowitz Stadttheater (1905–1922), Teatrul Naţional (1922–1940; 1941–1944)
- Address: Teatralna Square 1 Chernivtsi; Chernivtsi Oblast
- Coordinates: 48°17′30.50″N 25°55′51.62″E
- Operator: Department of Culture of Chernivtsi Regional State Administration
- Capacity: 742

Construction
- Groundbreaking: 1 August 1904
- Opened: 3 October 1905
- Architects: Ferdinand Fellner and Hermann Helmer

Website
- http://www.dramtheater.cv.ua/

Immovable Monument of National Significance of Ukraine
- Official name: Український музично-драматичний театр імені Ольги Кобилянської (Olha Kobylianska Ukrainian Music and Drama Theatre)
- Type: Architecture
- Reference no.: 240134

Olha Kobylianska Chernivtsi Academic Regional Ukrainian Music and Drama Theatre (Ukrainian: Чернівецький академічний обласний український музично-драматичний театр імені Ольги Кобилянської), also known as Kobylianska Drama Theatre, is a drama and music theatre located in Chernivtsi, Ukraine. The current building of the theater is a neobaroque architectural monument of national significance, built in 1905 by an Austrian architectural bureau Fellner & Helmer.

In 1940, the theater received its first professional crew. In 1954, it was renamed after a Ukrainian writer and playwright Olha Kobylianska. In 2023, a new workshop chamber stage space of the theater was opened in the building of a historic electrical substation on Lesi Ukrainky Street.

Chernivtsi Music and Drama Theatre is a part of European Route of Historic Theatres.

== History ==
Theatre arts first appeared in Chernivtsi with the annexation of Bukovina by the Habsburg Monarchy at the end of the 18th century. The first theatrical production in the city took place in 1784, when an Italian shadow theater visited the city. At the time, there was no specialized theater space, so performances were held in public places. In 1876, first stationary, wooden theater was built in the city, which served its purpose until it was deemed unsafe in 1904.

In 1897, a special commission tasked with organizing the construction of the theater was formed. Fellner & Helmer Architectural Bureau was commissioned to draft the project. In 1900, Ferdinand Fellner came to Chernivtsi to assist the planning process. Originally, Soborna (Austria) Square was chosen as a location for the theater, but was later changed to Teatralna (Elizabeth) Square. According to the agreement, the project was ready by May 1902. At the same time, the city was not ready, as it did not have the required amount of funds.

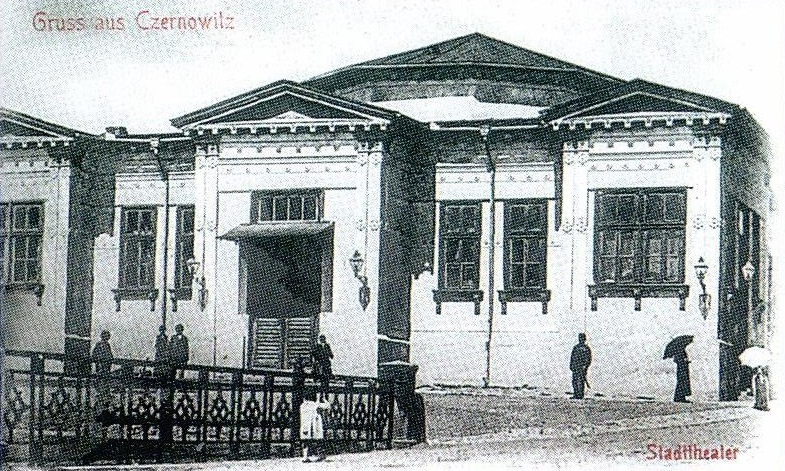
First building of the theater

On 30 May 1904, Hermann Helmer arrived in Chernivtsi, from whom the final version of the project was purchased, with an estimated construction costs of 600,000 kronen. On 1 August 1904, the "first stone" was laid. The construction work was carried out by the Fellner & Helmer bureau, and the works were directly supervised by the vice burgomaster Joseph Gregor.

The grand opening of the new theater took place on 3 October 1905 with a performance of Franz Schöntan play "Maria Theresa". In 1907, a monument to a German poet and playwright Friedrich Schiller was opened in front of the entrance to the building.

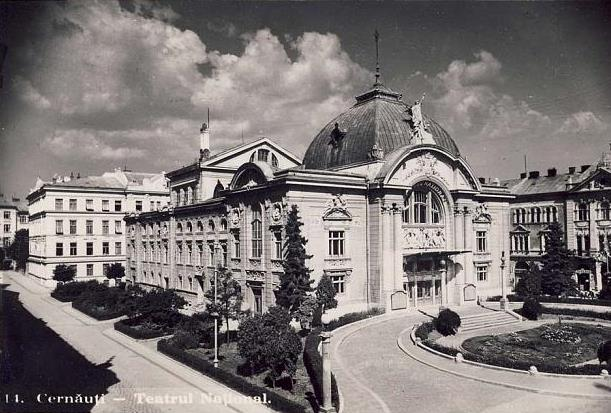
Chernivtsi Theatre during the Romanian rule

After the annexation of Northern Bukovina by Romania in 1918, a campaign against Austrian heritage began. In January 1922, organized by the local administration, a group of young Romanian chauvinists disrupted a performance of an Austrian actor Aleksandër Moisiu, who was touring in Chernivtsi. The youths tore down the German inscriptions, hung up the Romanian tricolor, and forced the actors and the audience to move into the building of the Chernivtsi Music Society. At the same time, the local authorities used the incident to take the building away from the city community. On 1 February 1922, the theater was transformed into "Teatrul Național". In addition, the local German community was forced to dismantle the Schiller monument, which was moved with a funeral procession to the territory of the German People's House.

On 7 August 1940, the Chernivtsi Oblast of the Ukrainian SSR was formed. In December 1940, by the decision of the Council of People's Commissars of the Ukrainian SSR, the creative team of the Kharkiv State Theatre of the Revolution was permanently relocated to Chernivtsi. On 14 January 1941, the theater premiered a play based on the drama "The Forest Song" by Lesya Ukrainka. The theater ended its first season in Chernivtsi on May 28 with the premiere of the play "Stolen Happiness" by Ivan Franko.

In 1954, the theater was named after a Ukrainian writer Olha Kobylianska and a monument to her was erected in front of the building. During 1977–1980, the building underwent renovation. On 2 August 1980, a new monument by sculptors Anatolii Skyba and Mykola Myroshnychenko was installed.

In 2003, "Golden Applause of Bukovyna" yearly comedy festival was founded. In 2005, marking the 100th anniversary of the theater a commemorative silver coin depicting the theater was released by the National Bank of Ukraine.

In 2023, a new workshop stage, oriented at smaller scale experimental plays, was opened in the nearby building of the Austrian era electrical substation. Later that year a small "panorama stage" was opened on the third floor of the theater. In 2023, the theater reported attendance of forty-one thousand.

== Architecture ==
Chernivtsi Theatre is a three-story baroque revival building and the dominant element of an architectural ensemble of city's Teatralna Square. The avant-corps of the building has four decorative columns and ends with a pediment on which a relief shield of the city coat of arms is installed. The portal of the theater is decorated with a sculpture of the Greek goddess Melpomene, the main entrance is decorated with a composition with a high-relief of Apollo surrounded by characters from antique cultures. The building is covered with a complex multi-gable roof, which looks like a dome topped by a spire.

Above the front windows are relief images of William Shakespeare and Richard Wagner, framed by muses. Busts of prominent German dramatists are installed in niches on the side elevations, along with stucco moldings in the form of coats of arms of Austrian cities. On the north (right) side, busts of Ludwig van Beethoven, Joseph Haydn, Johann Wolfgang von Goethe and Taras Shevchenko are placed; from the south (left) side, busts of Wolfgang Amadeus Mozart, Friedrich Schiller, Franz Schubert and Alexander Pushkin (removed in 2022). Busts of Shevchenko and Pushkin were installed during the second half of 20th century.

The three-panel front door leads to an oval vestibule, which contains white marble stairs to the second and third floors. The interior is composed of preserved original decorations in the baroque style, made in white and gold colors. The auditorium consists of a parterre, 35 balconies and an amphitheater.

In 1902, while the city government was unable to pay for the construction of the theater, the Fellner & Helmer bureau used the project to construct a theater in the city of Fürth in Bavaria, leaving two cities with nearly identical theaters.

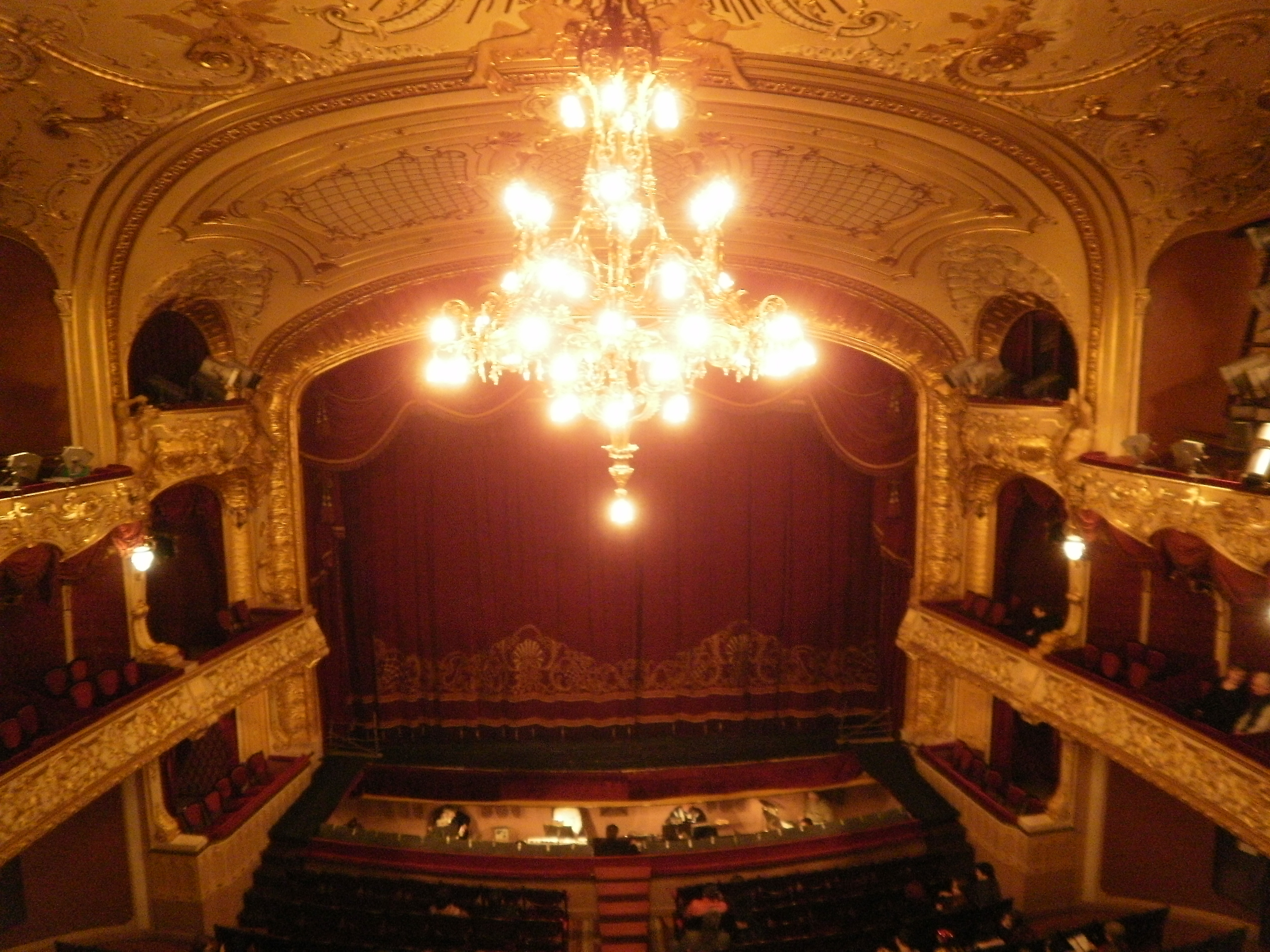
Auditorium

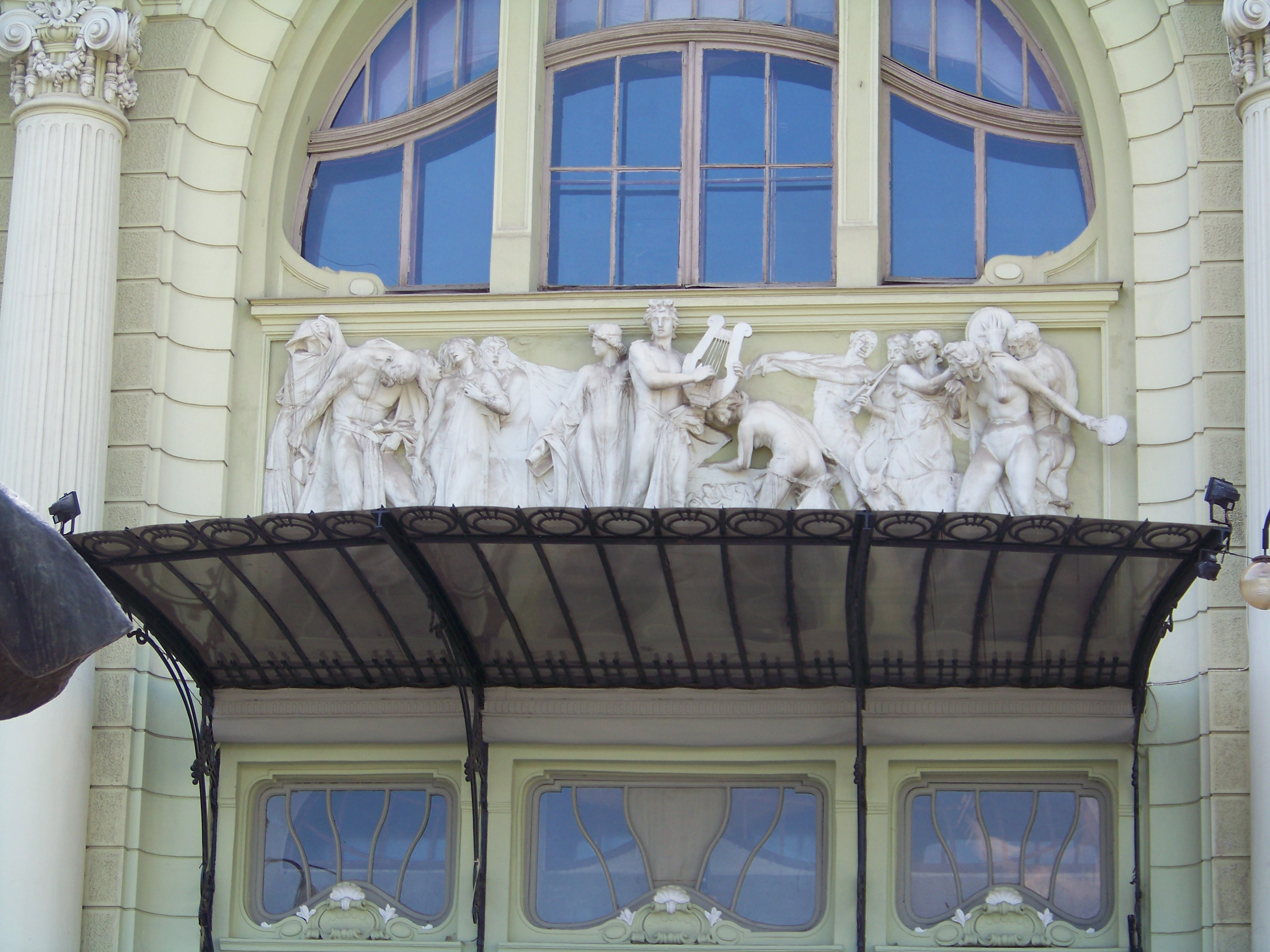
High-relief depicting scenes of ancient mythology

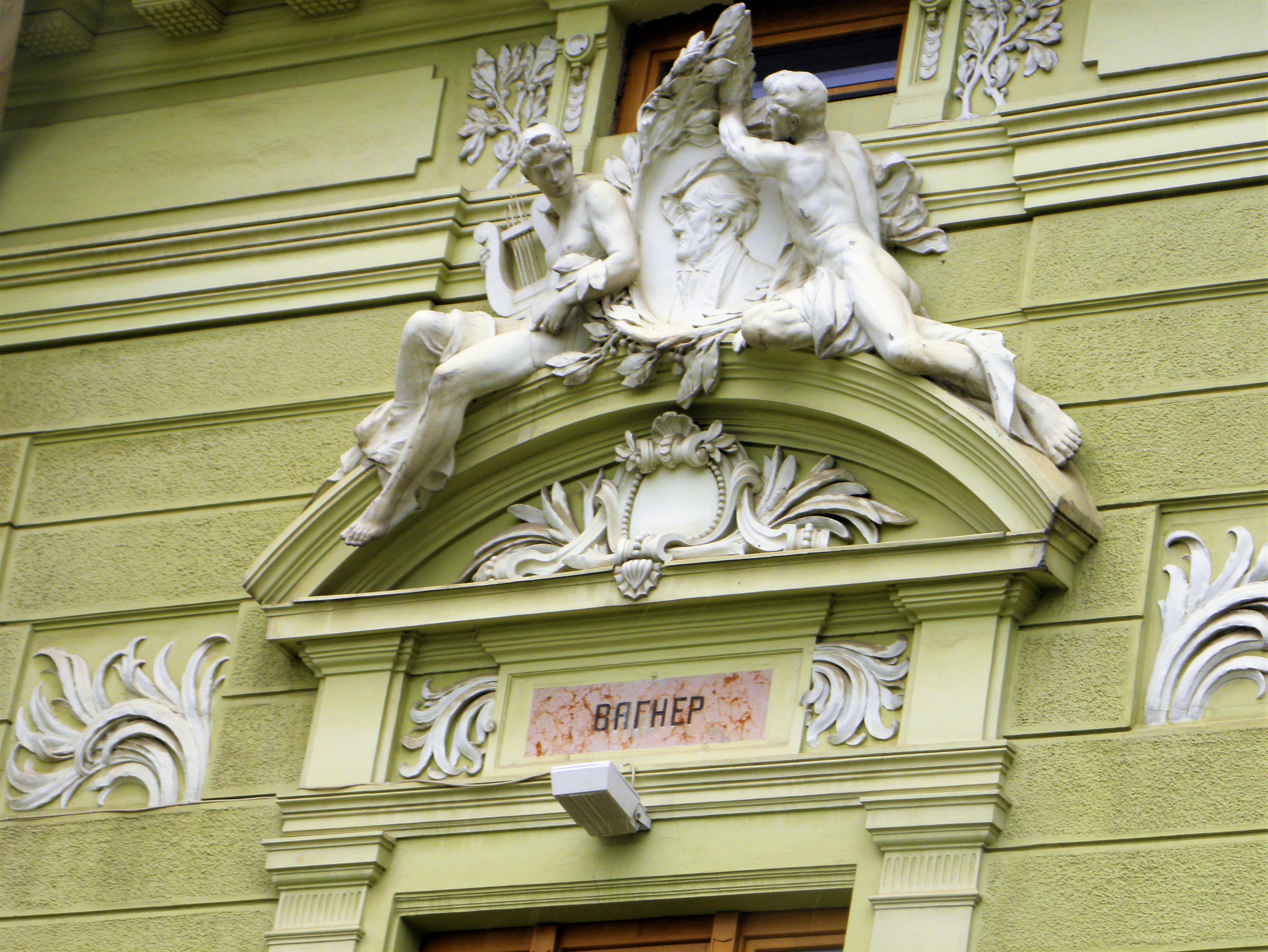
Relief image of Richard Wagner

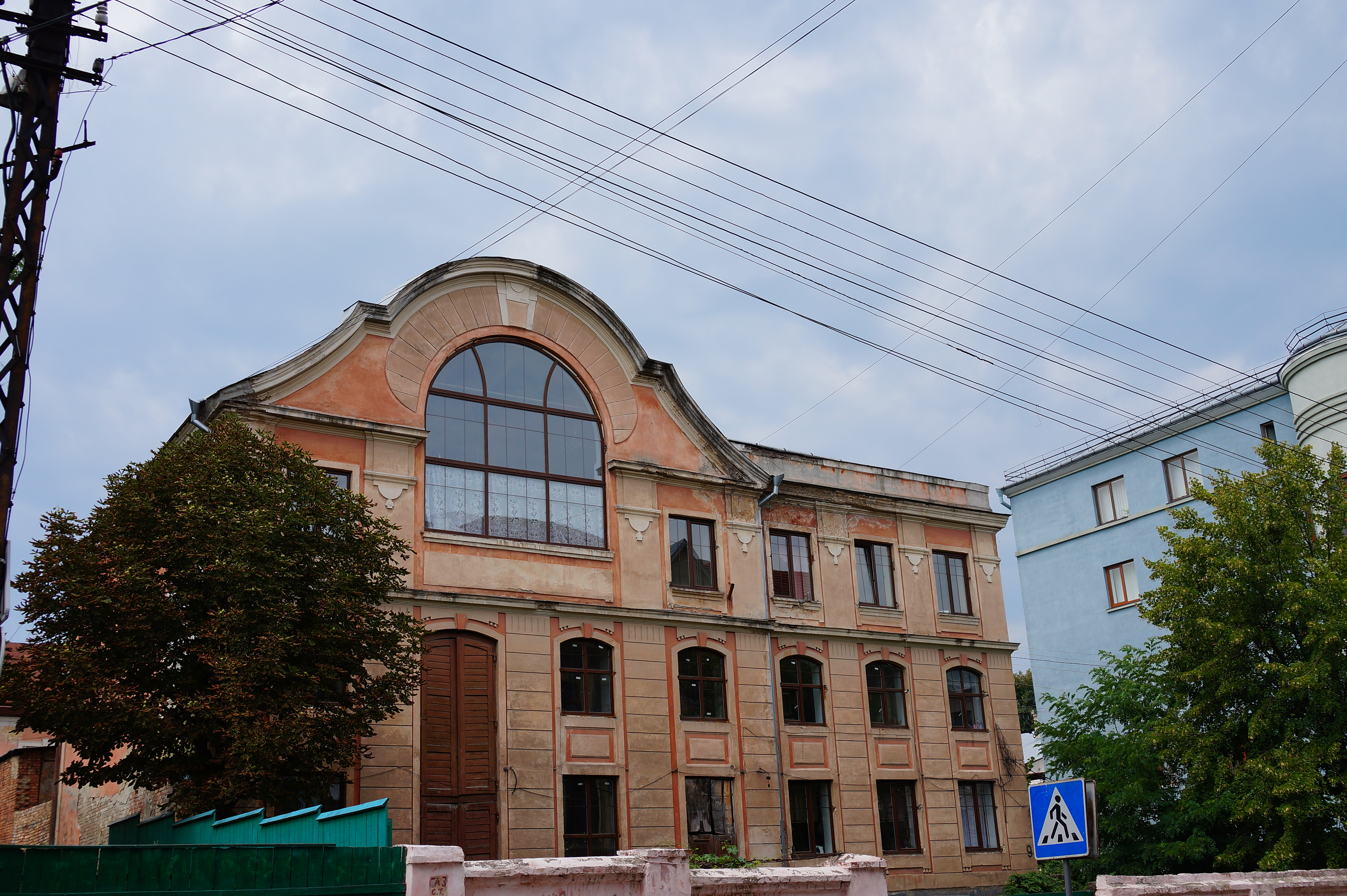
Building housing the workshop stage of the theatre

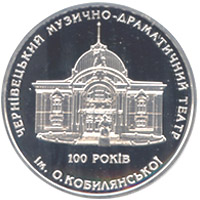
Memorial coin depicting the theatre

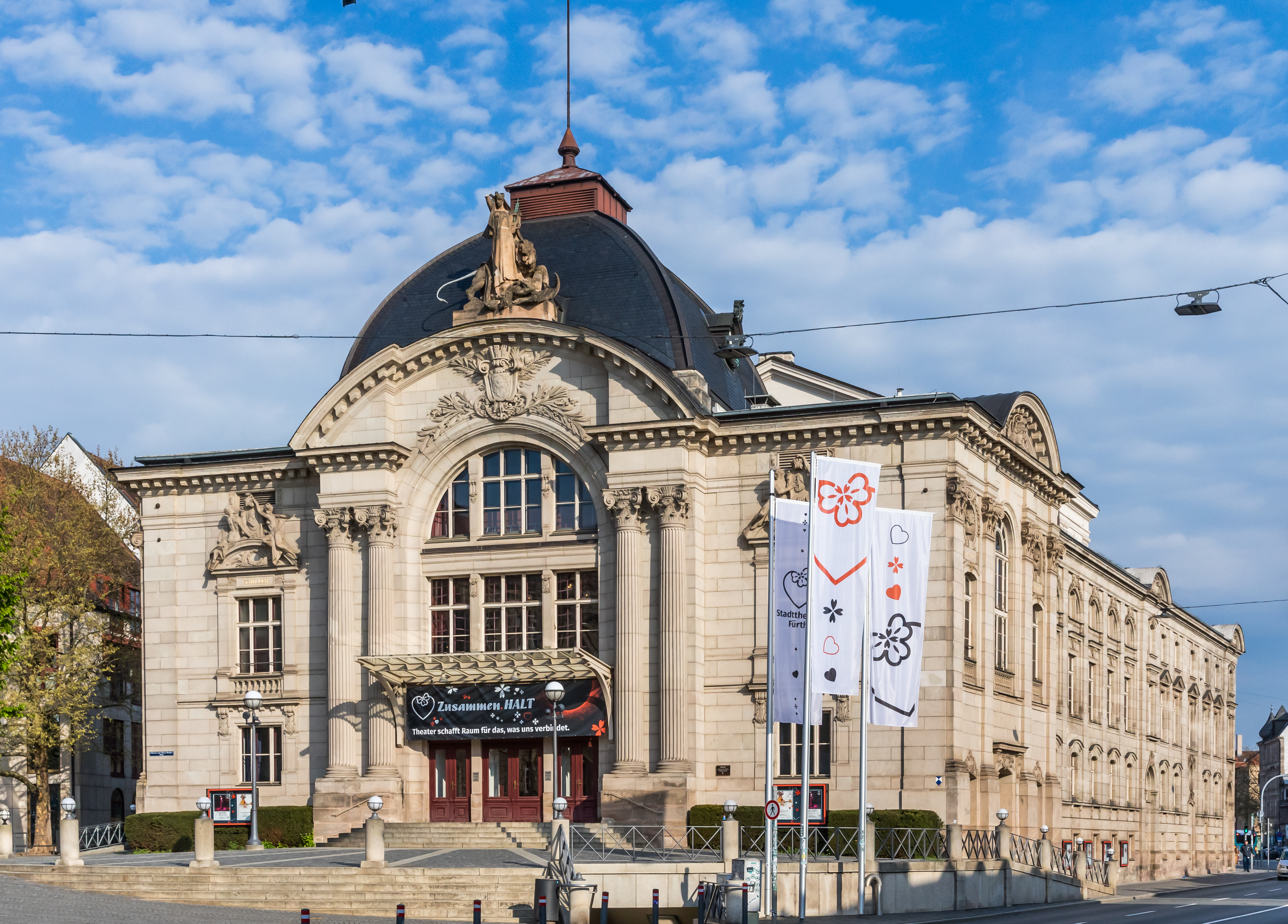
City Theatre in Fürth, Germany

== Sources ==
- Dienes, Gerhard M.: Fellner & Helmer. Die Architekten der Illusion. Theaterbau und Bühnenbild in Europa. Graz. 1999.
- Fassel, Horst: Vom Wandertheater zum Stadttheater. Deutschsprachiges Theater in der Moldau/Bukowina von 1848-1918. In: Fassel, Horst; Ulrich, Paul S.: „welt macht theater“. Deutsches Theater im Ausland vom 17.-20. Jahrhundert. Funktionsweisen und Zielsetzungen, Band 1. Berlin. 2006.
- Georg Drozdowski: Zur Geschichte des Theaters in der Bukowina. In: Buchenland. 150 Jahre Deutschtum in der Bukowina (= Veröffentlichungen des Südostdeutschen Kulturwerks, Band 16). Munich. 1961.
- Lang, Raimund: Czernowitz. Ein historischer Stadtführer. Vienna. 1995.
