= Adam Mickiewicz Theatre, Cieszyn =

Theatre in Cieszyn, Poland

Adam Mickiewicz Theatre in Cieszyn
- Teatr im. Adama Mickiewicza w Cieszynie
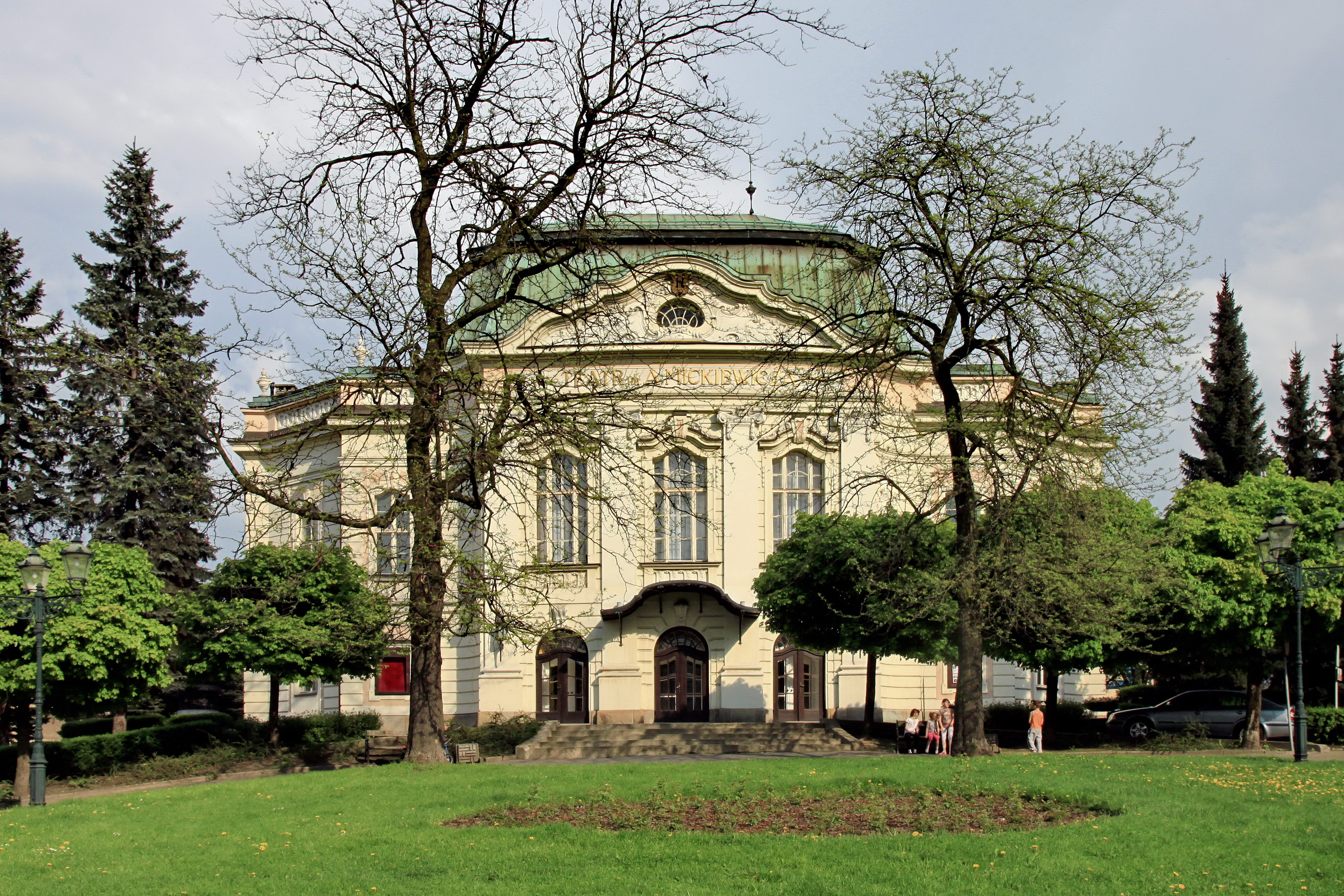
- Adam Mickiewicz Theatre in Cieszyn
- Interactive map of Adam Mickiewicz Theatre in Cieszyn
- Address: Teatralny Square 1 Cieszyn; Poland
- Coordinates: 49°45′00″N 18°37′49″E
- Owner: City of Cieszyn
- Capacity: 630
- Type: Dramatic theatre

Construction
- Opened: 1910
- Architects: Ferdinand Fellner, Hermann Helmer

Website
- Official website

Adam Mickiewicz Theatre (Polish: Teatr im. Adama Mickiewicza) is a theatre at the Theatre Square of the Old City in Cieszyn, Poland.

== History ==
The idea of building a theatre was put forward in spring 1902. A group of wealthy citizens of Cieszyn met at the German House to follow the initiative of a member of the city council, Franz Bartha, and set up the Theatre Construction Society (German: Der Theater-Bau-Verein). The board of the association comprised several persons: F. Bartha (chairman), Thomas Lenoch, Leopold Widenka and Johann Struhal. A vice mayor, later mayor Rudolf Bukowski was also elected to become a member of the department. After the association was set up, fund-raising was initiated among local wealthy Germans. 35% of the amount needed was raised, so the next steps were taken - a plot of land was chosen: a central location at the spot of the former barracks. A design was prepared by Viennese architects - Ferdinand Fellner and Hermann Helmer, who already designed 48 theatres in, inter alia, Vienna, Berlin, Toruń and Łańcut. Construction of the theatre was carried out by the company of Eugen Fulda from Cieszyn supported by an entrepreneur based in Berlin and Vienna, Hugo Baruch, experienced in constructing theatre stages and a still operating Viennese company Pittel & Brausewetter.

Construction works were finished in 1909, and the theatre was opened as Deutsches Theater [German Theatre] (the German sign was removed from the façade in October 1930). The theatre had 770 seats and standing places (currently 630 seats), a rotating stage, an iron anti-fire curtain, a boiler room and a power station, a decoration and costume depot, a ballet hall and wardrobes.

The ceremonial opening took place on 24 September 1910, when a play by Franz Grillparzer, Waves of Sea and Love was produced. The performance was prepared by Oskar Gärtner, the theatre manager. On the occasion of the opening of the theatre it was stressed that the new theatre was meant to be German and not a single word in Polish should ever be uttered on its stage. Shortly after the event this statement became completely disavowed. Ten years after the opening the role of the management of artists was carried out by the German Theatre Association (German: Teschner Theater-Verein, created from the Theatre Construction Association) and the Polish Theatre Association. On 14 December 1920 the first Polish play, a comedy by Aleksander Fredro, Zemsta, was performed by the Juliusz Słowacki Theatre from Kraków. An equally important event was a production of the opera Halka by Stanisław Moniuszko on 6 January 1923. The opera was performed by the Polish Theatre from Katowice.

During World War II the first renovation since the opening of the theatre took place: a rotating stage and an iron curtain were installed, seats in the entire auditorium were replaced (including installation of seats on the second gallery where so far there had been only standing places). For some time the theatre housed a vocational school and a ballet school. After three seasons actors were drafted to the army and actresses were engaged in army works.

In 1945 the Ministry of Culture and Art created an institution called the Polish Theatre in Cieszyn, the first principal of which became Mr. Stanisław Kwaskowski. On 18 October 1945 an opening spectacle took place to inaugurate the creation of the new institution - by Aleksander Fredro entitled: Pan Jowialski. From December 1945 to April 1961 the theatre operated as the second stage of the Polish Theater in Bielsko-Biała - the theatre presented all the productions that the theatre in Bielsko had in its repertoire. In 1961 the theatre was handed over to the authorities of Cieszyn and since that time it has been organisationally subordinated to the Municipal House of Culture in Cieszyn. In 1965 another overhaul connected with the modernization of the stage and anti-fire facilities took place; gilding in the auditorium was refreshed as well.

A new opening of the theatre took place on 4 December 1965. It was celebrated by a production of The Haunted Manor by Stanisław Moniuszko performed by Bytom Opera.

Another milestone for the theatre proved to be a two-year general overhaul in 1977–1979. In the course of the overhaul the following works were undertaken: replacement of the roof cover, installation of new window frames and doors, reconstruction of the oak entrance door, replacement of the heating system, installation of new technical equipment, replacement of electric wiring, reconstruction of the stucco of the foyer, the auditorium and staircases, installation of new upholstery of seats. On this occasion a sculptor from Cieszyn, Jan Herma, sculptured for the theatre bass reliefs of Helena Modrzejewska, Stanisław Moniuszko and Wojciech Bogusławski.

After completion of the renovation, the theatre was handed over to the administration of the Polish Theatre in Bielsko-Biała. At that time the theatre was called the State Polish Theatre Bielsko-Cieszyn of Adam Mickiewicz. The ceremonial opening of the redecorated theatre took place on 5 November 1979. The event was celebrated by a performance of Pan Tadeusz.

Since 1993 the Theatre of Adam Mickiewicz has been managed by the city authorities of Cieszyn.

== Architecture ==
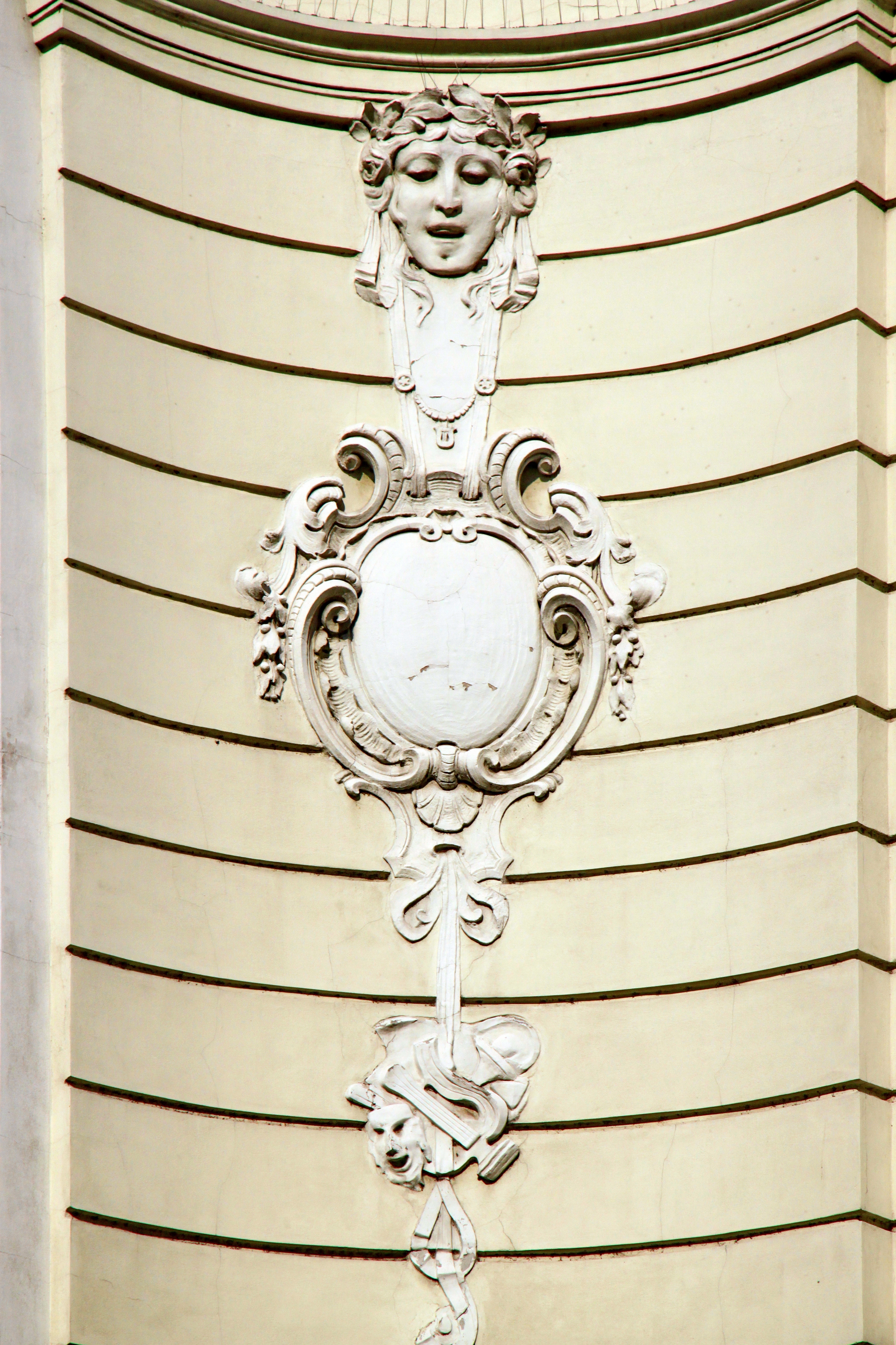
Detail of the bas-relief on the theatre façade

A five-story building of a cubic capacity of 16,944 m^{3} (598,400 cu ft) designed for 770 seats, constructed in the style of late Viennese Baroque. The façade is distinguished by a seven axes main façade with a triangle projection. Vertical divisions of the façade are emphasized by flat listens. A ledge, in its projection part, is finished by a pediment with a “kidney window” and a bas-relief in the shape of leaves, tree branches and decorative motives in rocaille style. Over the window, there is an attribute of Apollo - a bas-relief in the shape of a lire braided with a twig.

The building is covered by a high mansard roof with dormers and a turret. The vestibule is entered by three semi-circular portals over which windows were located and decorated by lintels of windowsills and dripstones. Over the central portal leading to the theatre a metal marquise is placed.

The interior of the theatre is dominated by three colours: white, gold and red. The first and the second floor is led to by staircases located at the sides of the oval vestibule. A ticket office is designed opposite to the entrance. Behind it there is a corridor surrounding the auditorium located on the ground floor into which ten doors lead. The corridor leads also to the theatre back end: depots, wardrobes, the flat of the guard and a doctor's room.

On the first floor there is a foyer with crystal chandeliers, from which one can go to ten box seats and a balcony of the auditorium. Stucco in the shape of leaves, shells and peacock tails located mainly on the ceiling and the frame of the stage. In front of the stage there is an orchestral moat, which can obscure the floor. The portal of the stage is decorated by a mask of Melpomene, and the ceiling is enriched by forged-in metal and plated ceiling.

In the lobby of the theatre there is a plaque that commemorates the initiators of the construction of the theatre - Franz Barth and Johann Struhal.

The following Viennese artists were responsible for decorating: Heinrich Hendner (stucco work), Friedrich Volkel (sculptures), Josef Kotts, Paul Niedoba (artistic painting), Eduard Riese (artistic metalwork), Ferdinand Moser (stage decoration).

The theatre had excellent acoustics - a whisper from the stage was heard in the ninth row on the second balcony, where sound catchers in the shape of a shell were placed. The point of the best audibility was determined on the fifth row of the ground floor.

== Activities ==
The theatre runs culture management activities. It offers performances of: theatre companies, musical companies, opera companies, operetta companies, ballet companies, folkloric companies, recitals, entertainers groups, music bands and cabarets. Frequent events taking place in the theatre are: presentations of amateur troupes, symposia, youth meetings, jubilee celebrations, school talent shows, theatre and film make-up and theatre workshops with a master.

One of the recurring events in the theatre since 1989, is the International Theatre Festival At the Border (currently Without Borders), which was organized by the Association of Polish-Czech-Slovak Solidarity.

== Trivia ==
In 1969 An Appeal to the audience of Adam Mickiewicz Theatre in Cieszyn was published, with original “comments on using the theatre”. They were created by The Theatre Lovers Section and the then Director - Jan Foltyn:

1. Punctuality is a sign of culture. Entering the audience after a beginning of a performance is not allowed. The late must wait in the corridor until a break. Leaving the audience during a performance should also be reduced to instances of illness, and escaping at the end of a performance, when artists are thanked and given flowers, should not take place. Garments shall be returned only after the lights go on.
2. Entering the theatre without a ticket is treated similarly to travelling by train or bus without paying a fare.
3. A well-behaved spectator shall not eat during a performance, make noises with wrappings, treat others with candies, talk, whisper and even hum or speak loudly.
4. So far smoking is allowed in the lobby on the ground floor and at the buffet on the first floor. On the stairs, in the corridors and in the toilets smoking is not allowed. (Non-compliance shall be penalised by mandates).
5. All instances of prank and hustle by the young at the stairs and corridors are prohibited.
6. Booked tickets should be purchased at least 4 days before a performance (...). One should also purchase tickets for the second balcony, where the price is lower, and visibility and acoustics in such a small theatre are good as well.
7. Giving tickets (especially the ones from companies) for plays for adults to children is pointless, since the young shall not be allowed inside.

From 2 to 7 May 1974, inside the theatre Andrzej Wajda was shooting his film entitled The Promised Land. "For the purpose of the film seats were removed and replaced by chairs. Also, a classic prompter's box was installed. Small theatre shells with candles were created (this is how a theatre used to be illuminated), door handles were replaced."

On 31 May 1991, in the course of the second edition of the International Theatre Festival At the border an unusual event took place related to the production of The Brothers Karamazov prepared by a Czechoslovak theatre from Ústí nad Labem. In the course of the performance the director of the theatre got a phone call from the Border Guard in Cieszyn. The question was:

Is it true, that at the moment a performance is in progress with the participation of Czech actors?

The director was informed that two individuals claiming to be actors were detained for illegal crossing of the border. It was promptly discovered that, indeed, two actors who were about to appear of the stage were missing. Thanks to the goodwill of the commanding officer of the Border Guard and the intervention of the festival organizers - the members of the Association of Polish-Czech-Slovak Solidarity, the actors were brought to the theatre and they participated in the performance. It turned out that the actors became victims of their own ignorance related to crossing the border in Český Těšín. The actors were staying on the Czech side of the Olza River and decided to walk from their hotel to the theatre (the remaining part of the theatre group went by bus). They did not take into account the fact that there would be a long queue to the border checks (reaching the railway station in Český Těšín). The actors did not have enough time to queue and the queuers, the so-called ants (persons dealing with carrying alcohol and cigarettes from the Czech Republic), did not let them go forward. The determined actors decided to cross the river by foot and were detained by the Polish Border Guard. The performance was finished successfully, while the audience was completely unaware of the entire event.

In front of the theatre there are two trees, monuments of nature – Gleditsia triacanthos.
