= Teatro Alessandro Bonci =

Civic opera house in Cesena, Italy

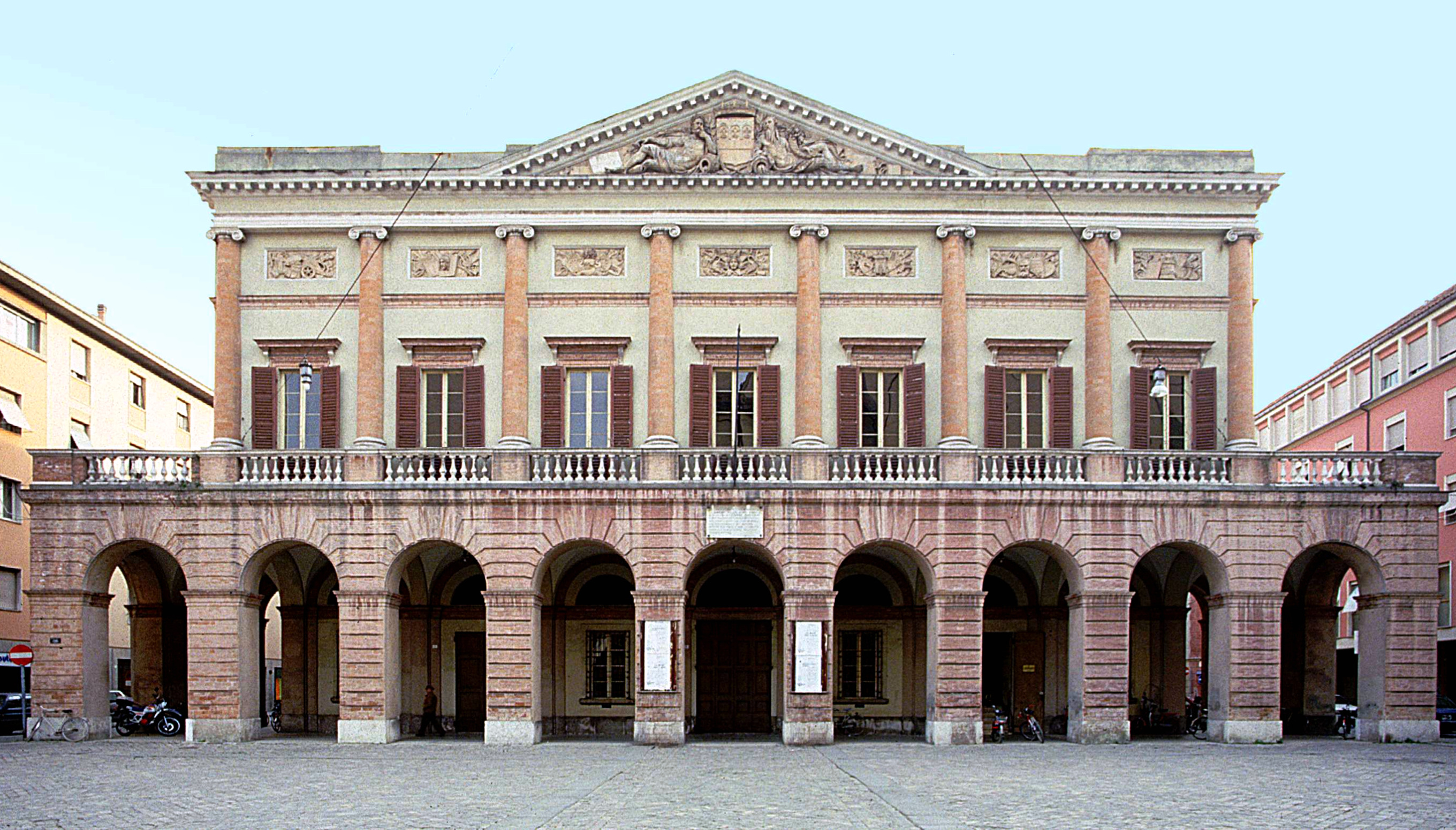
Teatro Comunale Alessandro Bonci

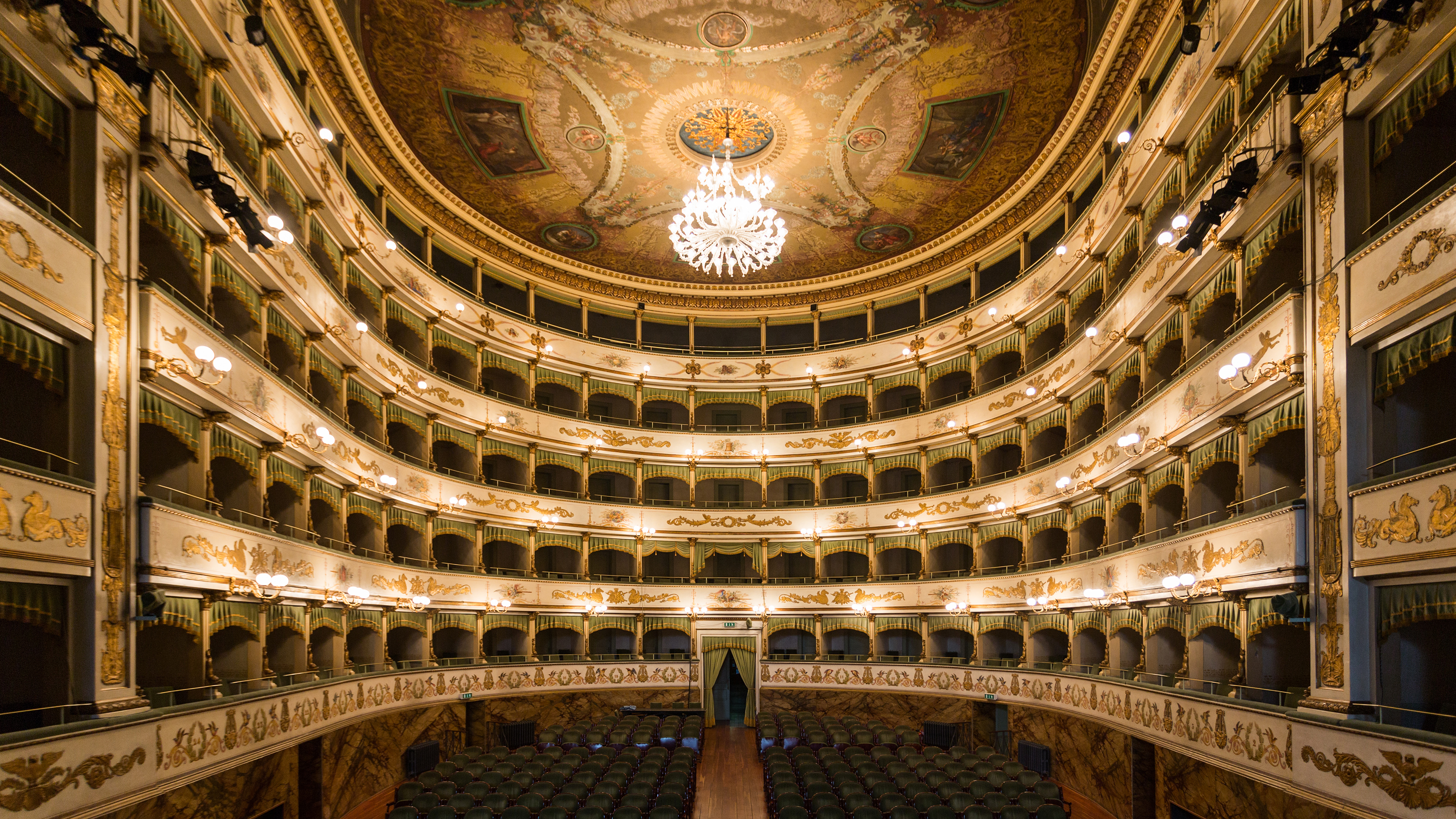
Interior view

The Teatro Comunale Alessandro Bonci (Alessandro Bonci Theatre) is an opera house in Cesena, Italy.

== History ==
The Bonci Theatre was built on the site of the old Spada Theatre starting in August 1843 on a design by the architect Vincenzo Ghinelli. It was opened on 15 August 1846 with a performance of Maria di Rohan by Gaetano Donizetti, featuring the soprano Teresa De Giuli Borsi and the tenor Gaetano Fraschini, followed by the ballet Beatrice di Gand, starring dancer Fanny Elssler. It distinguished itself with dramatic and lyric opera productions, a fact confirmed by the presence of leading performers of the period. It was dedicated to the tenor from Cesena Alessandro Bonci after his performances of 1904 and 1927. Bonci was born in Cesena on 10 February 1870.

The theater is a member of the Italian route section of the European Route of Historic Theatres.

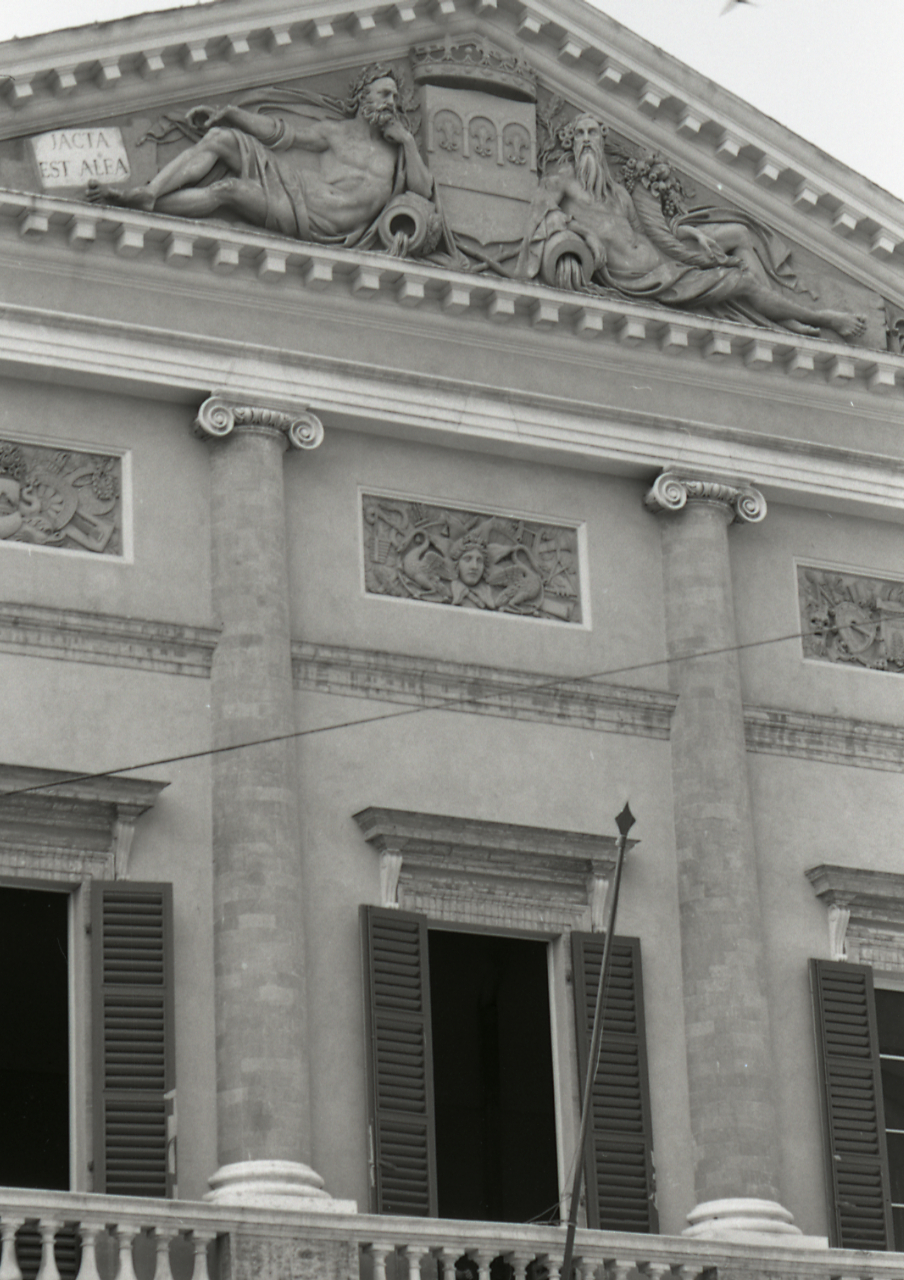
Detail of the facade in a 1972 photo by Paolo Monti
