= Teatro Lethes =

Theatre in Faro, Portugal

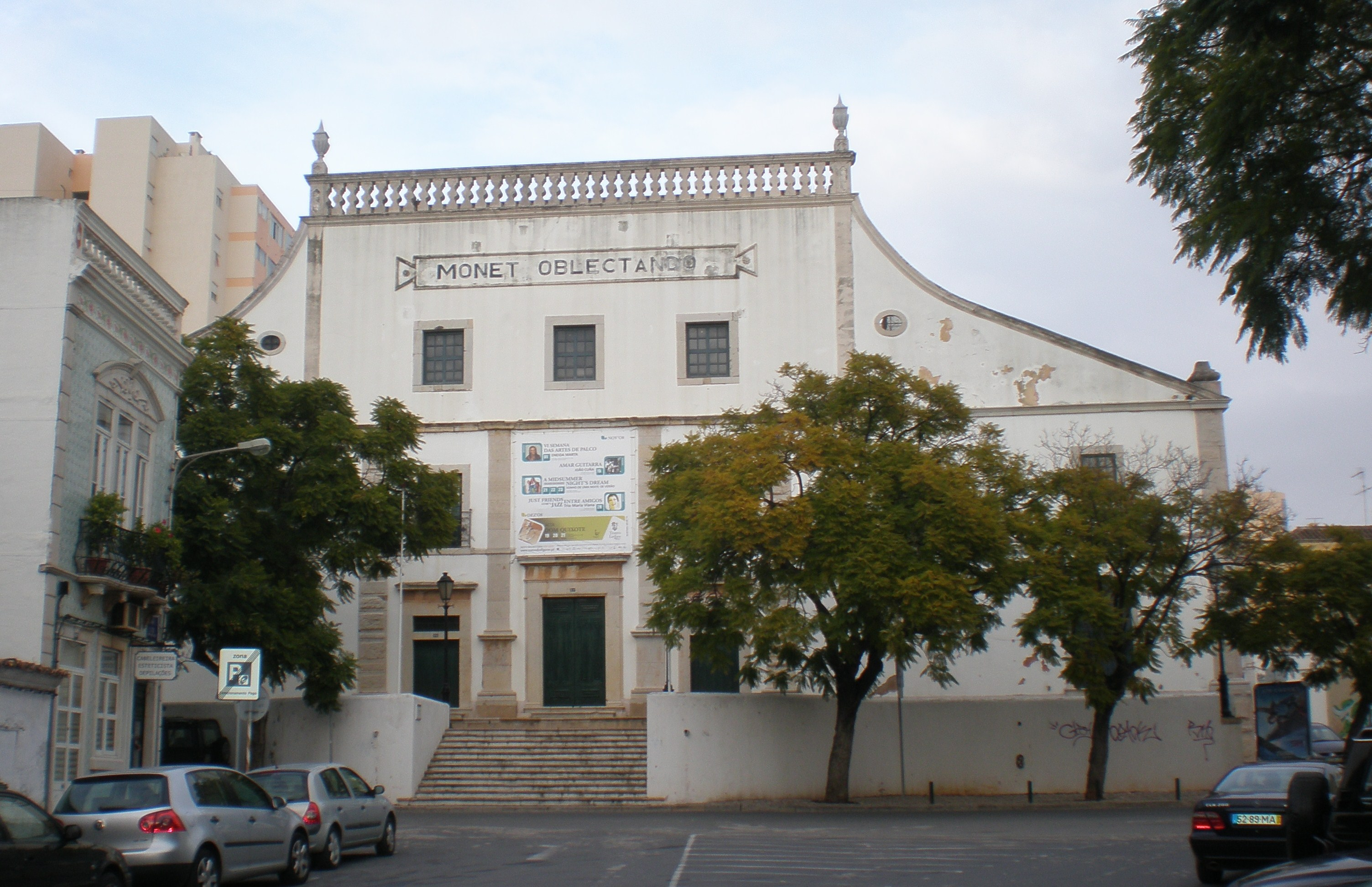
- Interactive map of Teatro Lethes
- Address: Faro, Portugal; Portugal
- Coordinates: 37°01′06″N 07°55′54″W

Construction
- Opened: 4 April 1845

Teatro Lethes, or Teatro Letes, is a theatre, with adjacent buildings, located in the city of Faro in the Algarve region of Portugal. The building dates back to 1605, having first been a Jesuit college. It was inaugurated as a theatre in 1845.

== Early history ==
The original building, approved in 1599 when the Jesuits settled in Faro and constructed by 1605, was the Colégio de Santiago Maior da Companhia de Jesus, a Jesuit college founded by the Bishop of the Algarve, Fernando Martins Mascarenhas. In 1759, after the banishment of the Jesuits from Portugal and confiscation of their assets, the college closed its doors and the buildings initially became part of the Royal Treasury. In 1807 during the French invasion of Portugal under General Jean-Andoche Junot, the former college was used to house French soldiers, and was badly desecrated in the process. The skeleton of a Napoleonic soldier was later found walled up inside the theatre.

== Conversion to a theatre ==
Occupied by the Order of the Carmelites until 1834, the property was sold in 1843 at public auction to Lázaro Doglioni, an Italian doctor from Venice, who had publicly expressed his intention to build a theatre in Faro similar to the Teatro Nacional de São Carlos in the Portuguese capital of Lisbon and La Scala in Milan. Doglioni had been travelling from Italy to England in 1804 when he was shipwrecked off Cape St. Vincent and decided to stay in Portugal. After restructuring, the Teatro Lethes was inaugurated on 4 April 1845, on the occasion of the birthday of Queen Maria II. It was given the name of Lethe, one of the five rivers of the underworld of Hades in Greek mythology. The Latin inscription on the building's facade, monet oblectando, can be translated as "it instructs with amusement". The theatre was inherited by Doglioni's nephew, Justino Cúmano, who expanded it around 1860 to increase its capacity. On 11 September 1898, the first Theatrograph (early film projector) show in Faro was given there.

== 20th century ==
Between 1906 and 1908 the theatre underwent further renovation, to improve acoustics and comfort. However, its popularity began to decline at the beginning of the 1920s, culminating in closure in 1925. In 1951, the Cúmano family sold the building to the Portuguese Red Cross. Subject to successive restoration work, the management of the theatre was, in October 2012, passed to the Algarve Theatre Company (ACTA), which both presents shows and uses the building for receptions. Looked at today, the central part of the theatre from the front was the Jesuit college's church and the two side structures were part of the college facilities. Inside, it retains the structure of a theatre of the 19th century with both stalls and boxes.

Teatro Lethes has been classified as a Building of Public Interest since 1993.

== Miscellany ==
The theatre was the site of a tragic event when a ballerina committed suicide while on stage, apparently because of unrequited love.
