= Teatre Principal de Maó =

Coordinates: 39°53′17″N 4°15′48″E

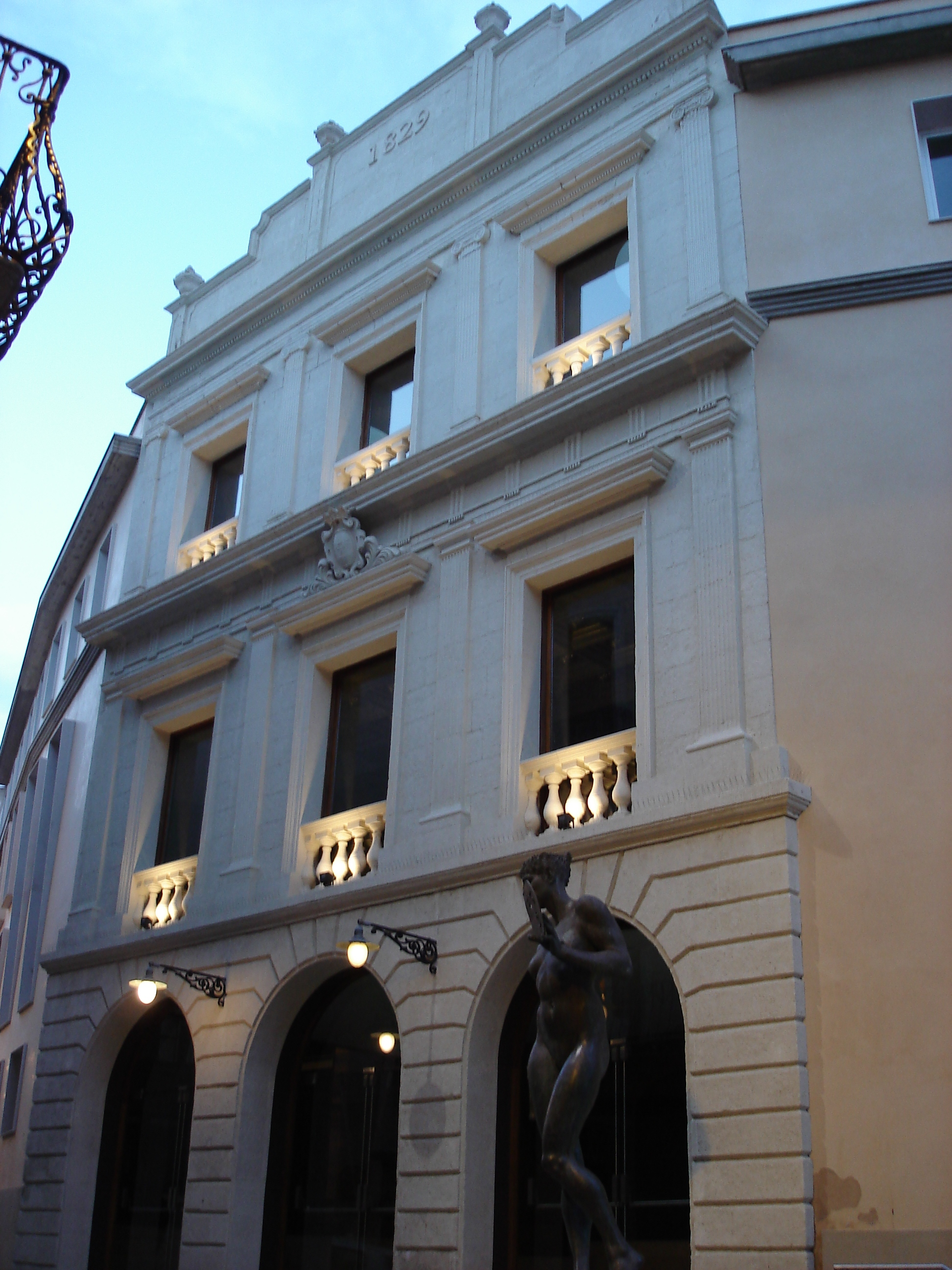

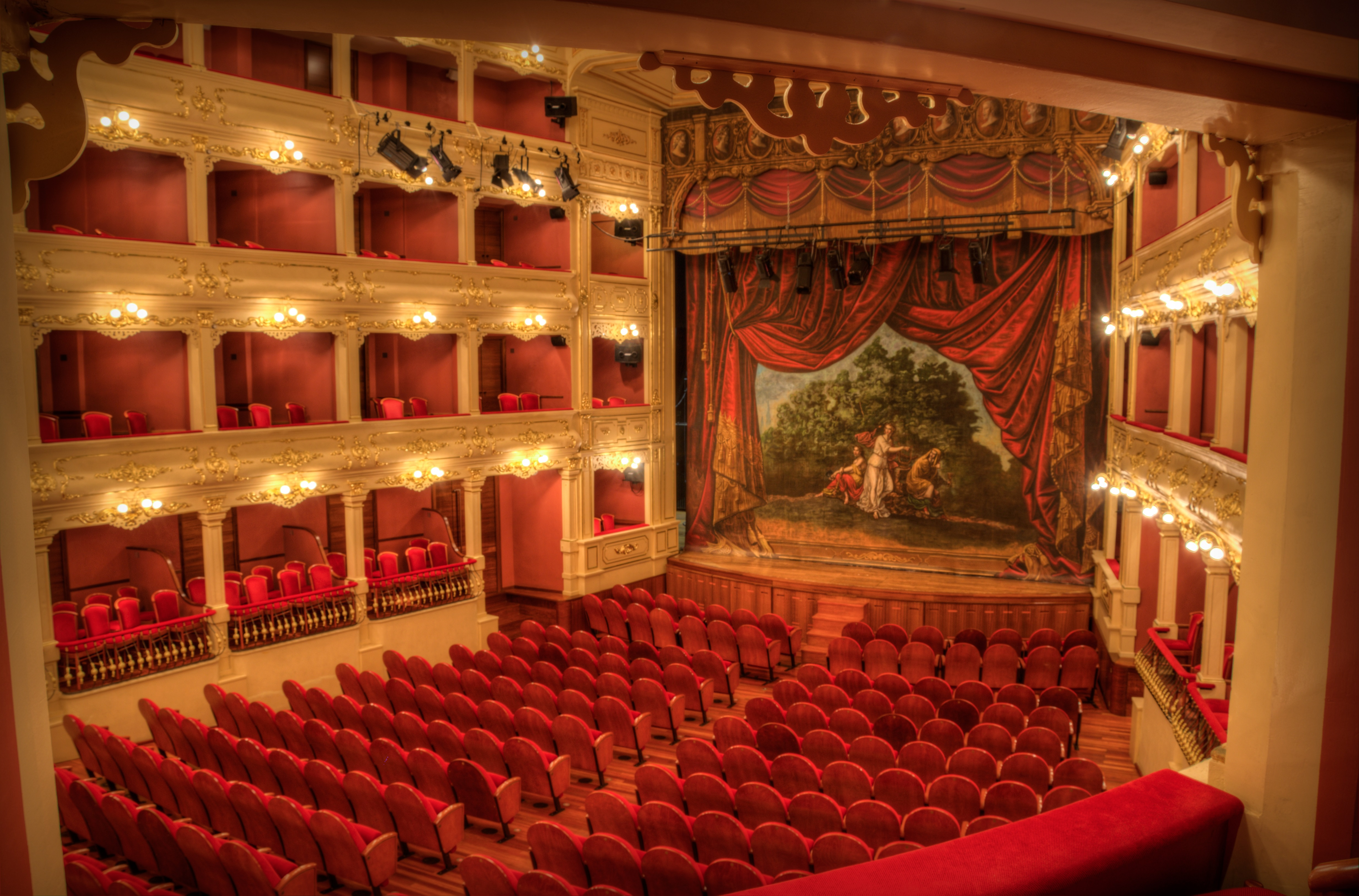
Sala del Teatro Principal de Mahón

Teatre Principal de Maó (Catalan) or Teatro Principal de Mahón (Spanish) is an opera house located in the Spanish city of Mahón, the capital of the island of Menorca.

The Principal, as is known colloquially, is one of the oldest opera houses in Spain. It was built in 1829, to a design by Giovanni Palagi, according to the Italian standards of 18th century opera, and opened on 15 December 1829. Every year, The Principal hosts Opera Week, an event where important opera figures who sing the bel canto repertoire perform. The theatre is also an important focus of Menorcan culture.
