= Stadttheater Grein =

Coordinates: 48.227351°N 14.854833°E

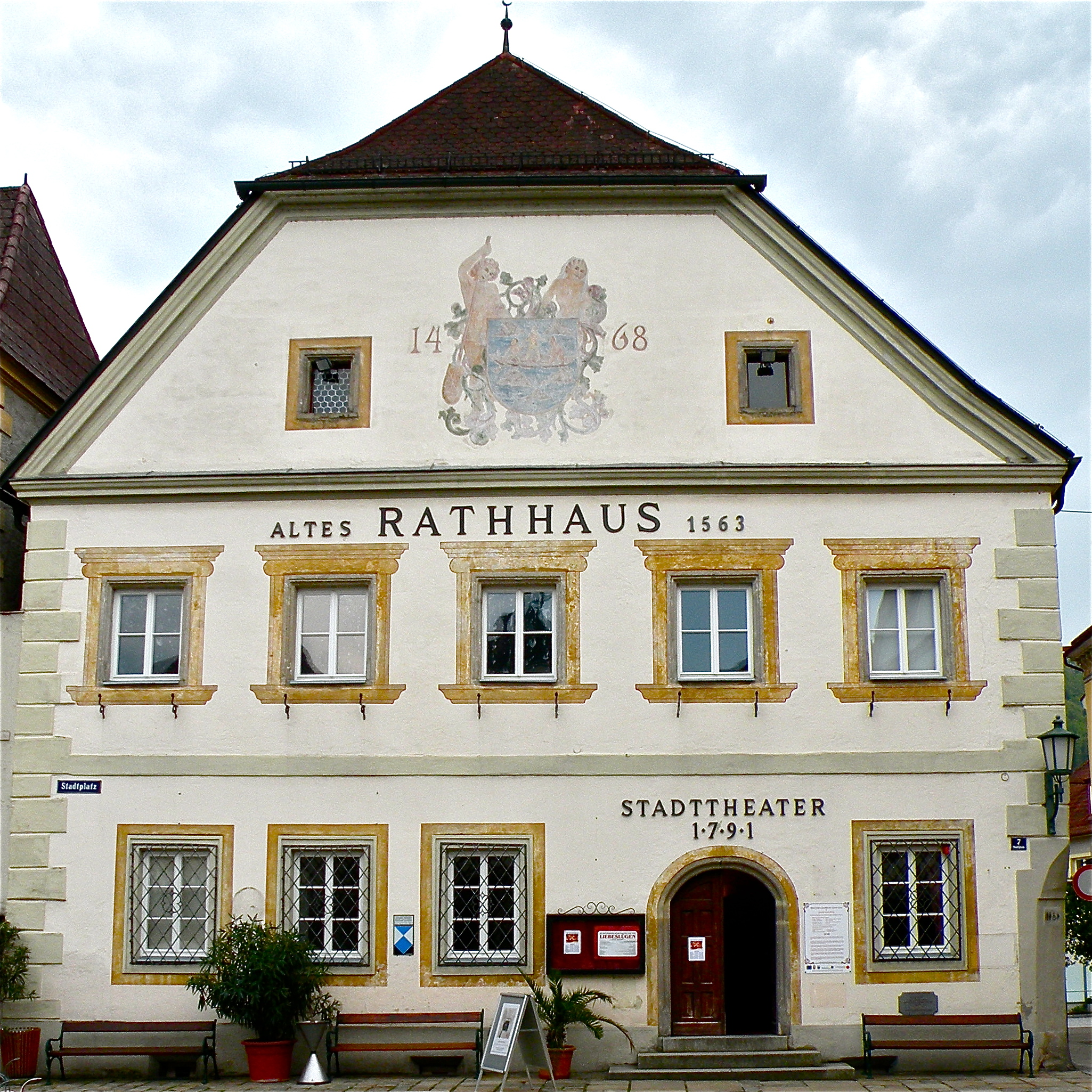
An image of Stadttheater Grein

Stadttheater Grein is a theatre in Austria.
