= Ferdinand Fellner =

Austrian architect

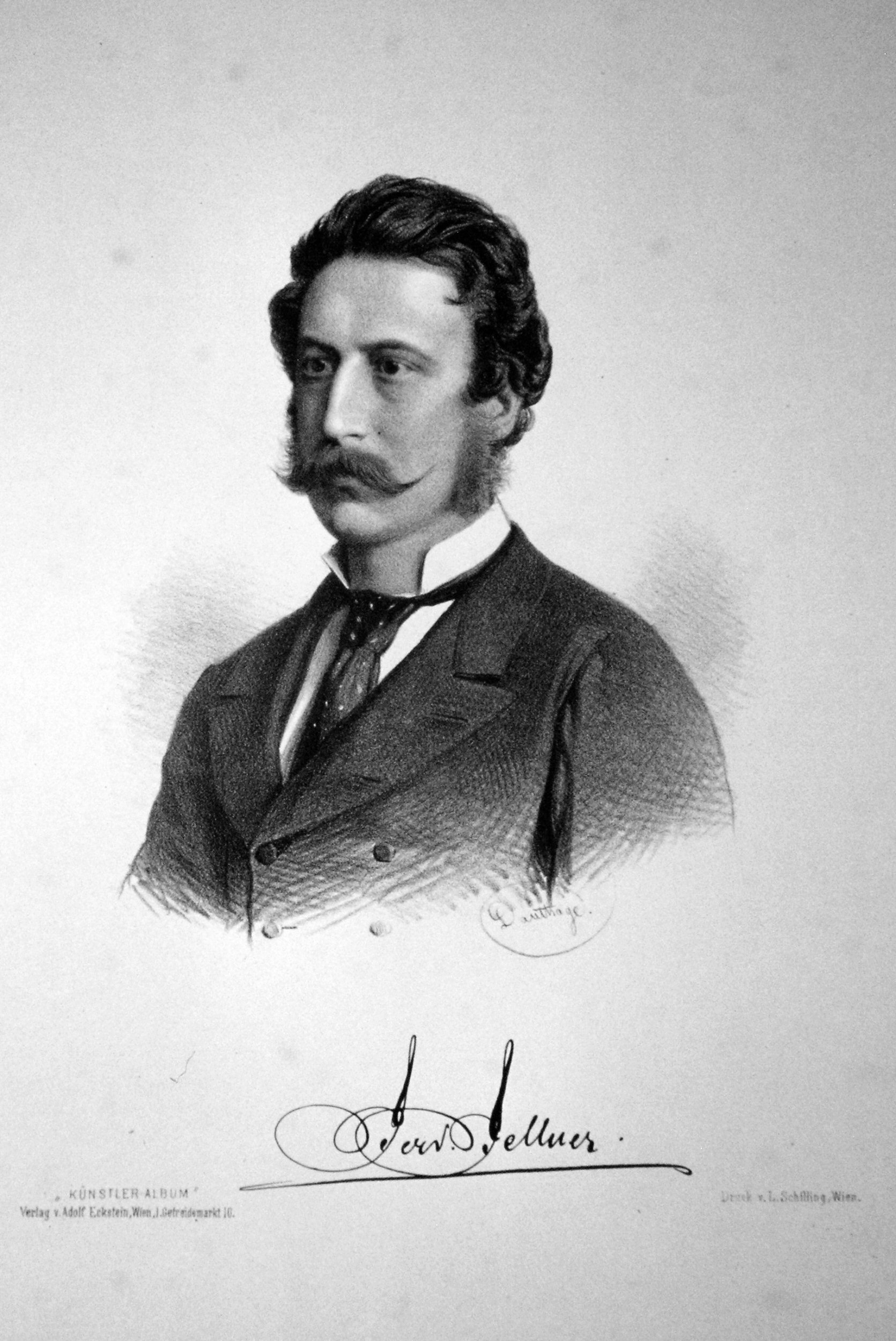
- Born: 19 April 1847; Vienna, Austria
- Died: 22 March 1916 (aged 68); Vienna, Austria
- Occupation: Architect

Ferdinand Fellner (19 April 1847 – 22 March 1916) was an Austrian architect.

== Biography ==
Fellner joined his ailing father's architecture firm at the age of nineteen. After his father's death he founded the architecture studio Fellner & Helmer with Hermann Helmer in 1873.
