= Hermann Helmer =

German-Austrian architect

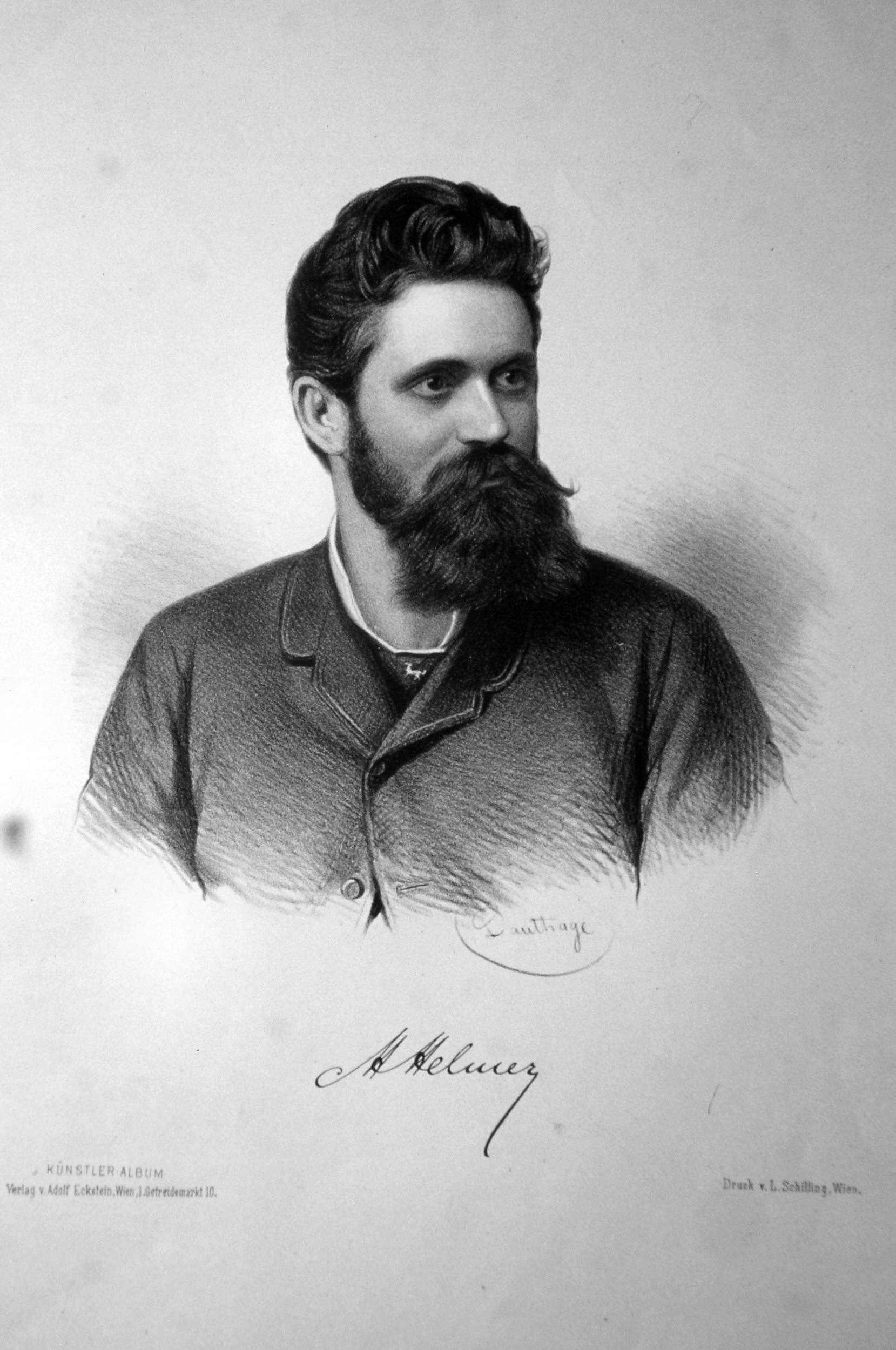
- Born: 13 July 1849; Harburg, Kingdom of Hanover
- Died: 2 April 1919 (aged 69); Vienna, Republic of German-Austria
- Occupation: Architect

Hermann Gottlieb Helmer (13 July 1849 – 2 April 1919) was a German architect who mainly worked in Austria.

== Biography ==
After completing an apprenticeship as a bricklayer, and some further education he joined the architecture firm of Ferdinand Fellner Sr. After his death he founded the architecture studio Fellner & Helmer together with his son Ferdinand Fellner in 1873.

== See also ==
- Croatian National Theatre, Varaždin
