= Scenic design and sets in commedia dell'arte =

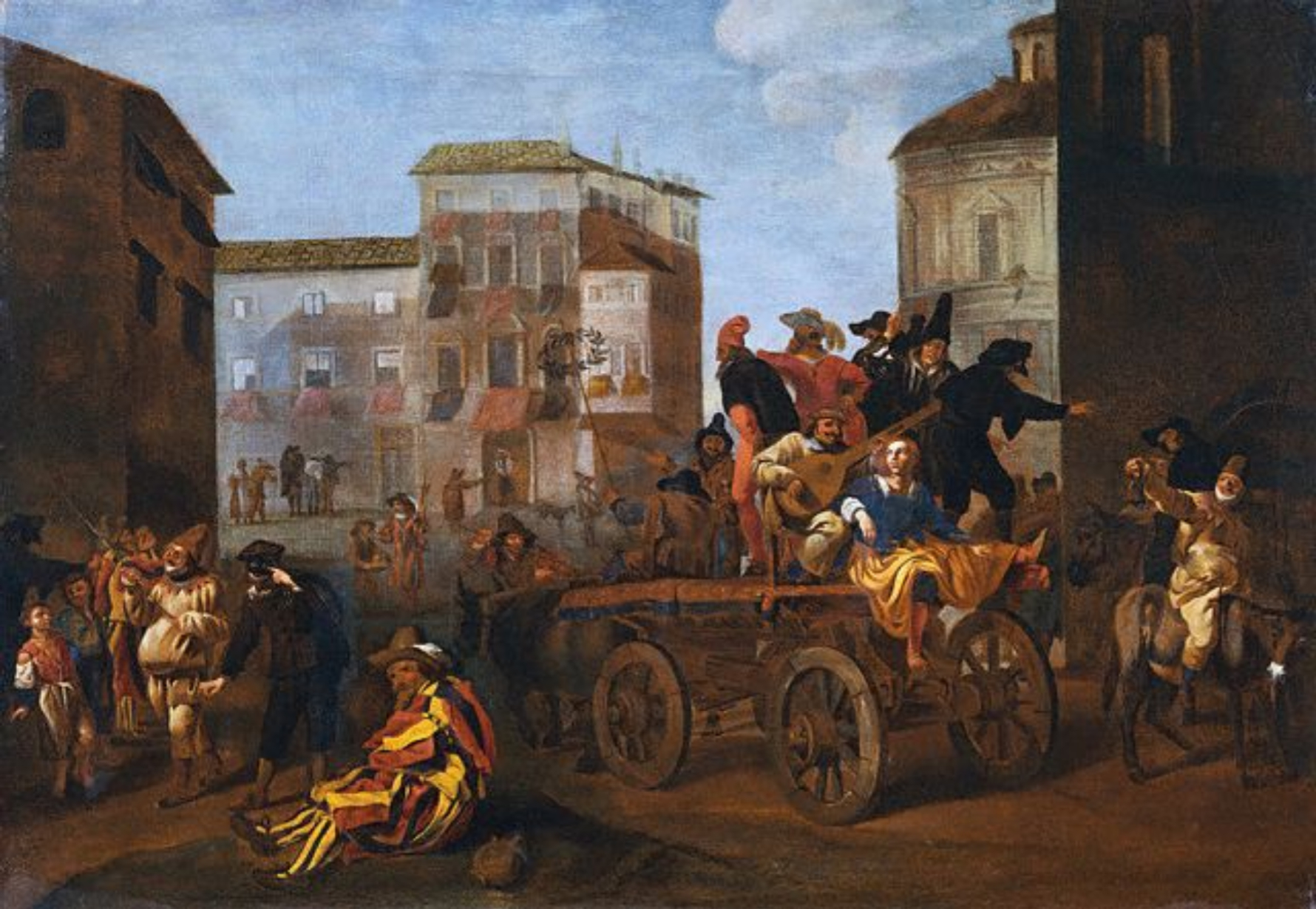
This is an example of one of the many depictions of Commedia dell'Arte actors performing on the street.

There is evidence of indoor and outdoor stages used for Commedia dell'Arte with a variation of scenic design. While we know for a fact that Commedia dell'Arte Troupes did perform in indoor spaces, there is no real evidence of use for outdoor spaces aside from depictions of various artists.

== Indoor Stages ==
The building of new theaters during the Renaissance came from the attempts of rich scholars to rediscover the classical theatre of Greece and Rome. Some theaters were built in the homes of the lesser gentry in Italy while some were built in public spaces such as apothecary shops and local inns. Other public places that were commonly used for performances were "stanzas" which were multi purpose meeting rooms. The theaters built in these public buildings were used for longer amounts of time and were more available for public performances.

All of these indoor spaces had the facilities for scenery and design, mostly perspective scenery. They also had scene changing equipment and special effect machines which Commedia dell'Arte companies did not need but when it was available, would make use of it.

Italian theaters developed slowly throughout the Renaissance helping with Commedia dell'Arte Troupes, although the developments were mostly thanks to the Opera. By 1637, theaters in Venice had evolved into having a pit, box, gallery, and proscenium arch. Traveling Commedia dell'Arte Troupes used theaters where they found them, sometimes would help create them, and sometimes would have to make do without them.

=== Examples of indoor stages ===
==== Baldracca ====
In 1547, the Medici built a public theatre, the Baldracca, as a venue for professional entertainers traveling to the city.

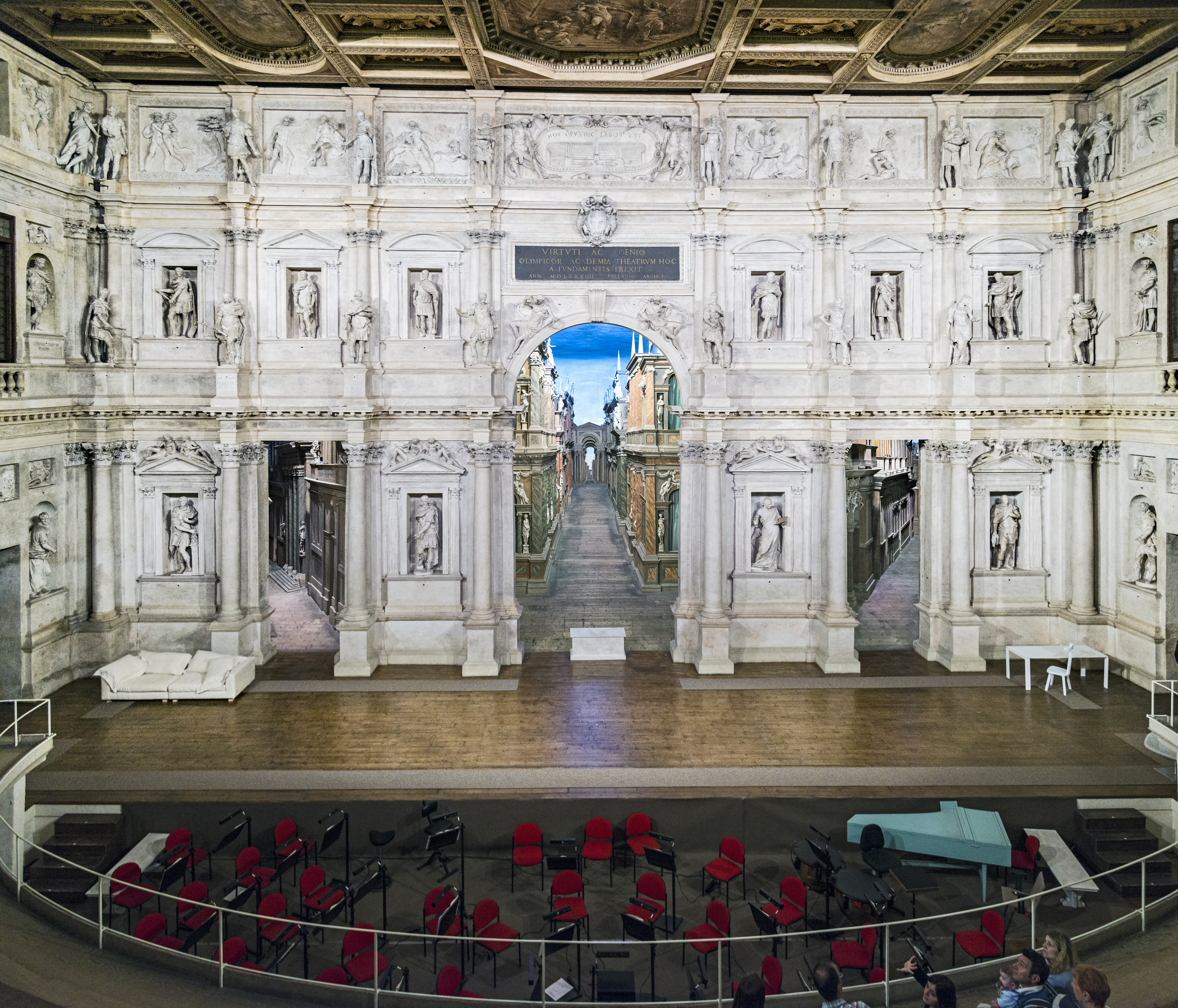
Teatro Olimpico

==== Teatro Olimpico ====
Teatro Olimpico is Europe's oldest existing post-Roman theatre and it was built for the academy at Vicenza in 1584 for a production of the Greek tragedy, Oedipus the King. As said earlier, this theatre was built in an attempt to revive classical theatre and the interesting thing about this theatre is that the set was built permanently and specifically for Oedipus, no other set can be built there. The scenic design in Teatro Olimpico is a good example of the kind of designs which were used during this time. Because Oedipus is a tragic play the set is built with classical architecture. Also common at the time, the set is designed in forced perspective.

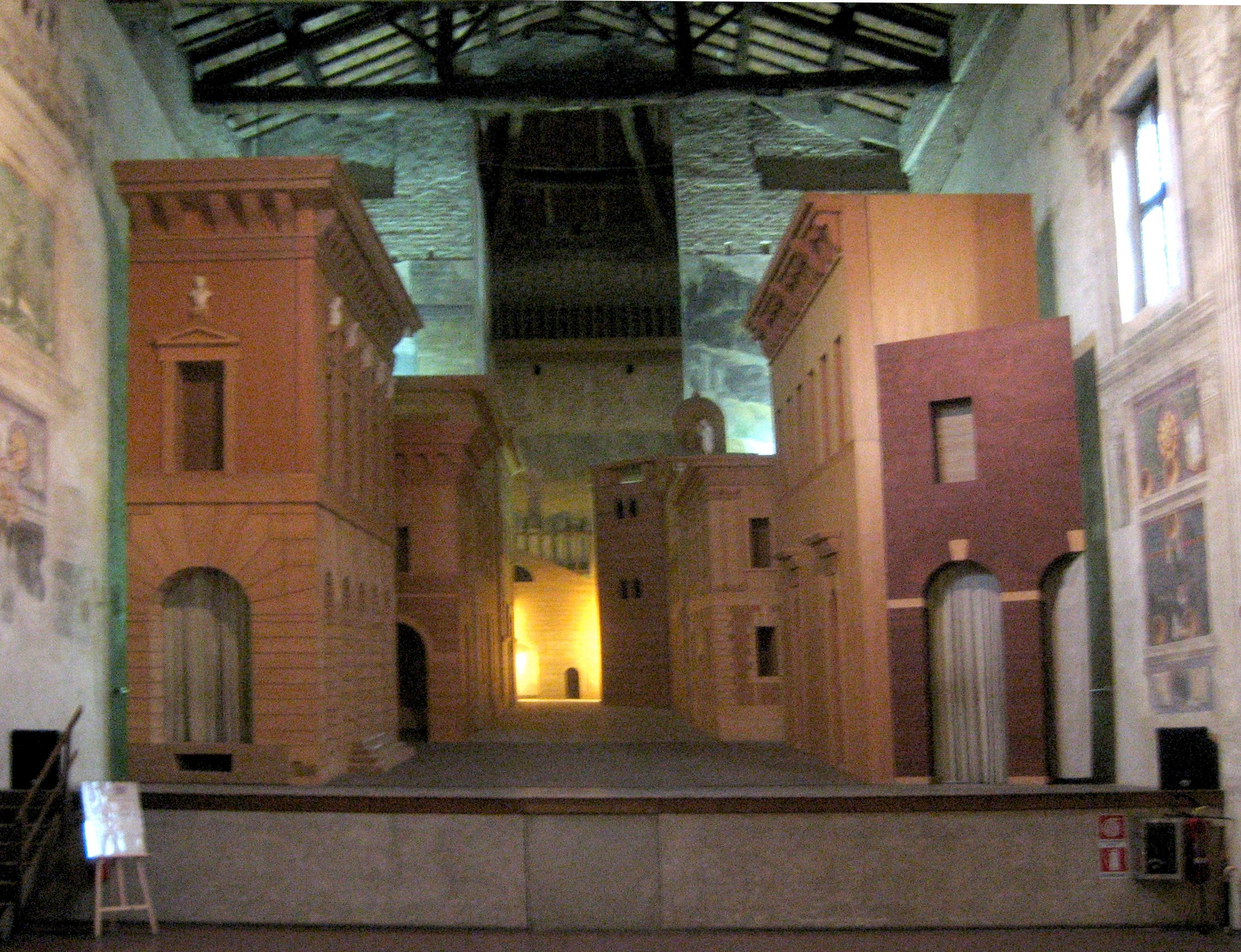
Teatro all'Antica at Sabbioneta

== Outdoor Stages ==
Commedia dell'Arte has been depicted as actors in masks performing on temporary stages in market squares in woodcuts, paintee sides of the stage. Simple curtains often are depicted hanging behind the actors sometimes painted try to convince audience members to go see it.
