= Teatro all'Antica =

Coordinates: 44°59′56″N 10°29′21″E

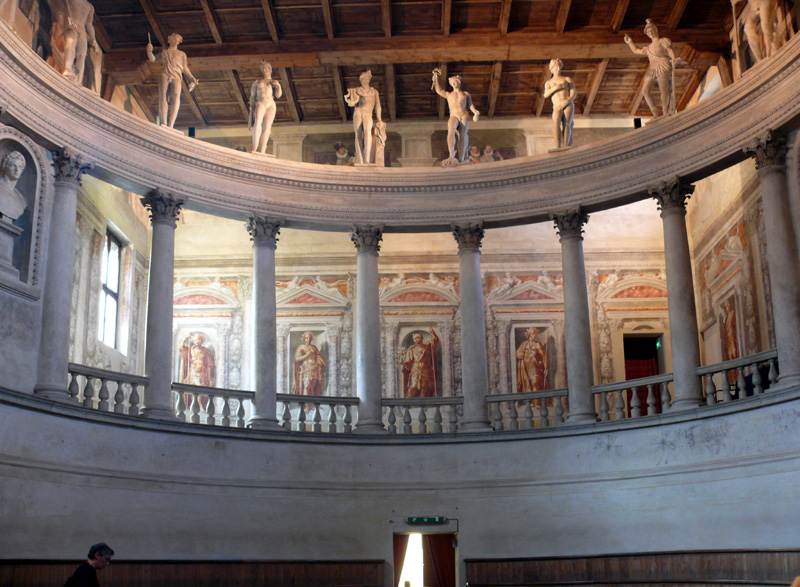
View from the stage towards the gallery above the seating area.

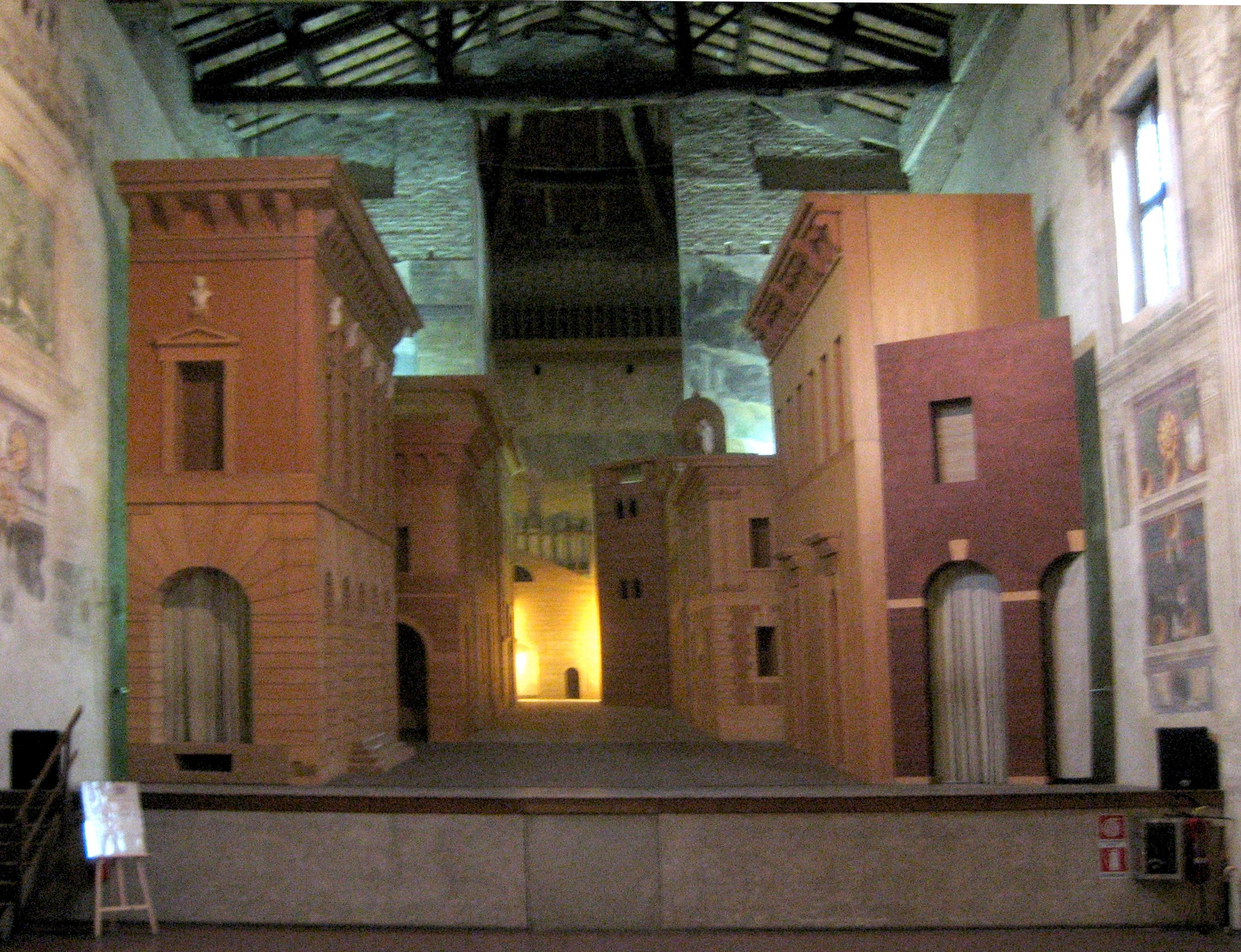
The stage of the Teatro all'Antica, viewed from the seating area. The perspective scenery is a modern reconstruction of Scamozzi's original work.

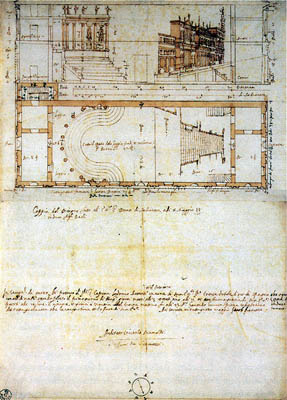
Vincenzo Scamozzi's elevation (top) and floor plan (below) for the Teatro all'Antica.

The Teatro all'Antica ("Theater in the style of the ancients") is a theatre in Sabbioneta, northern Italy; it was the first free-standing, purpose-built theater in the modern world. The Teatro all'Antica is the second-oldest surviving indoor theater in the world (after the Teatro Olimpico in Vicenza), and is, along with that theater and the Teatro Farnese in Parma, one of only three Renaissance theaters still in existence.

== History ==
The theater was constructed in 1588 and 1590 by the celebrated Vicentine architect Vincenzo Scamozzi under a commission from Duke Vespasiano I Gonzaga, as part of Gonzaga's effort to turn his tiny Ducal seat into an idealized classical city. The importance that theater had come to hold, as a sign of the civilized society that the Duke was trying to create, is indicated by the prestigious location that was reserved for the theatre in the principal street of the town, the Via Giulia, and by the fact that a separate building was erected to hold the theatre. This prestige location had a cost, however, in the form of a cramped and narrow setting that could be successfully converted into a theater only by the considerable ingenuity of one of the Renaissance's most gifted architects.

The influence of the Teatro Olimpico upon the Teatro all'Antica is evident in a number of features—most notably in the colonnade at the rear of the seating area and in the set designs. Such influences are to be expected; Scamozzi had overseen the construction of the Teatro Olimpico following the death of the great Andrea Palladio, who had laid out its original design. In particular, Scamozzi had been responsible for the remarkable perspectives which form the onstage scenery at the Teatro Olimpico.

However, the Teatro all'Antica was a much different theatre, in part because of the different building in which it was placed, and in part because Scamozzi had learned important lessons as a result of his labours at the earlier theatre. The theatre building is roughly three times as long as it is wide, whereas the space occupied by the Teatro Olimpico is approximately square. The longer, narrower structure of the theatre building meant that Scamozzi was unable to build the seating area in the form of the semicircle that had been seen by Palladio as the ideal form for an audience, based on the model of ancient Roman theatres. Where the wide, shallow space available in the converted building that was used to house the Teatro Olimpico had forced Palladio to stretch the ideal semicircle into an ellipse, the opposite change was forced upon Scamozzi in Sabbioneta, and the seating area was transformed into a horseshoe.

As well, Scamozzi abandoned completely the elaborate and classically inspired scaenae frons that in many ways is the defining feature of the Teatro Olimpico. The removal of this rigid stage backdrop, which had forced him to build seven separate street scenes in order that all audience members could see at least one part of the scenery, made it possible to construct a single perspective view of a single street scene. Scamozzi's plans for this trompe-l'œil scenery are clearly visible in the upper-right corner of his plans for the theatre. The illusion of great distance was achieved by rapidly diminishing the size of the false-front buildings over a compressed distance. As an integral part of the illusion, the floor level rose rapidly to allow the buildings to shrink vertically, and the two sides of the street closed in on each other sharply. These two features of the set design can be seen, respectively, on the upper right-hand side and lower right-hand side of Scamozzi's plans. Given the narrowness of the seating area, a single perspective was sufficient for all audience members.

In the 17th century, Scamozzi's original scenery was removed and replaced by a new system with sliding wings. However, his original plans—which are shown above—were preserved in the archives at the Uffizi in Florence, making it possible, in the twentieth century, for new scenery to be rebuilt based on the original plans and added to the theatre.

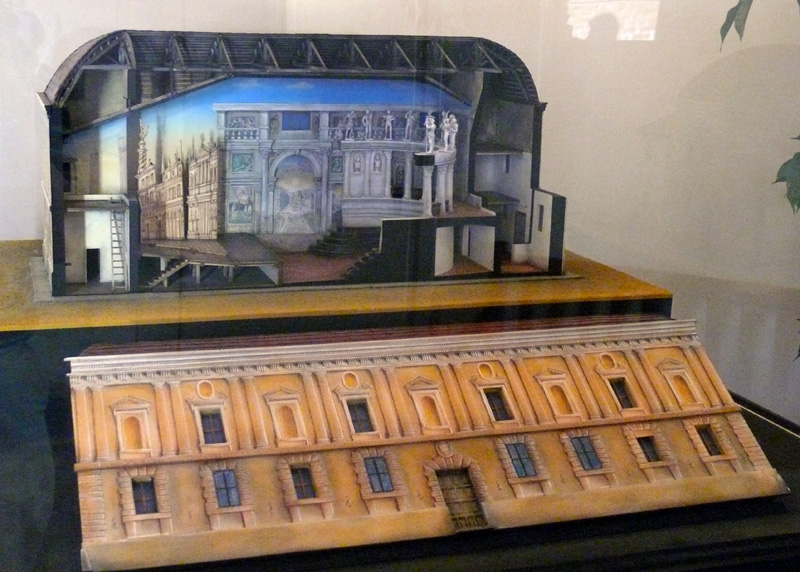
This scale model of the Teatro all'Antica is located inside the theatre.
