= Teatro Farnese =

Theatre in Parma, Italy

Coordinates: 44°48′16.9″N 10°19′33.0″E

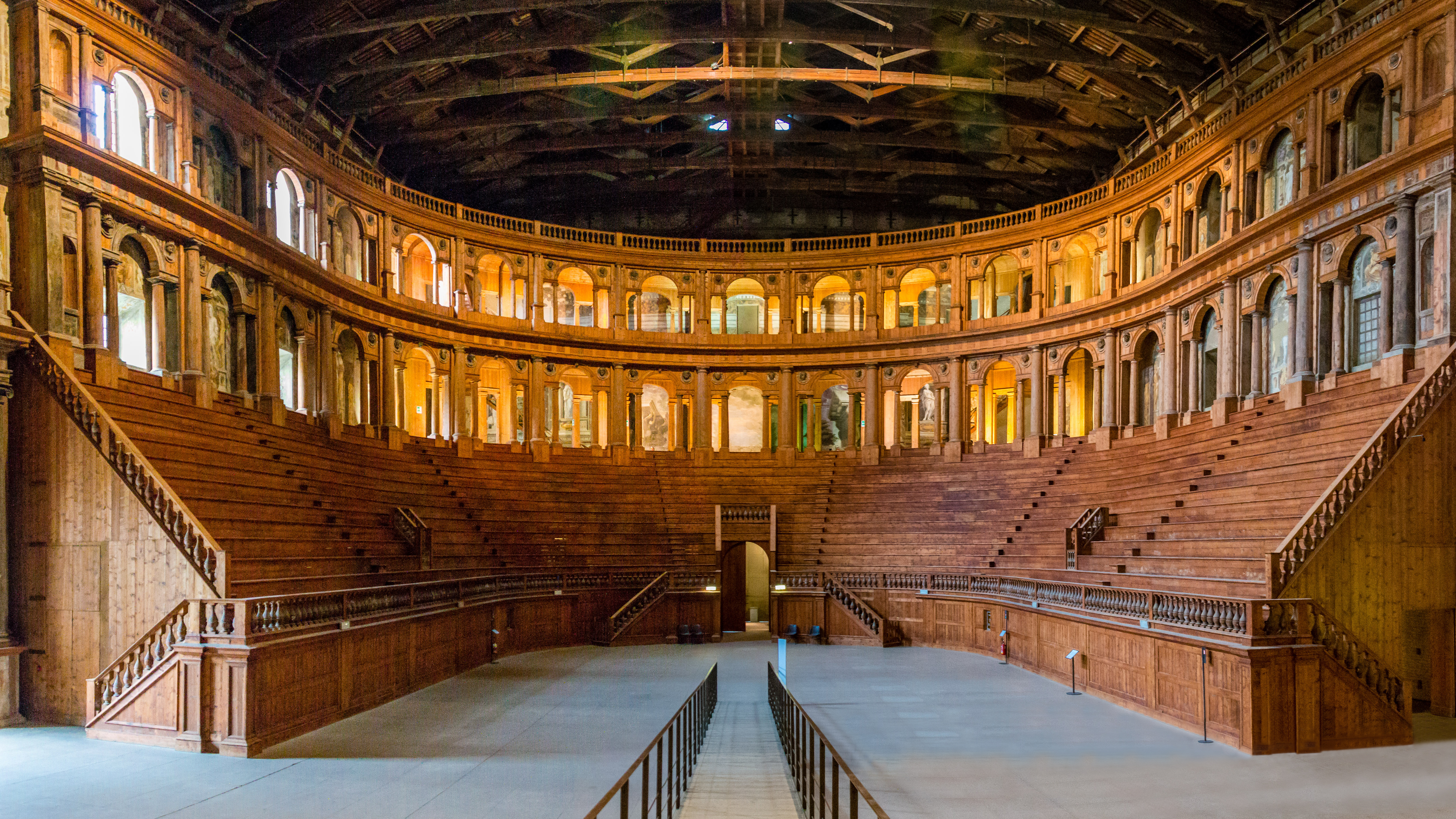
Teatro Farnese in Parma

Teatro Farnese is a Renaissance theatre in the Palazzo della Pilotta, Parma, Italy. It was built in 1618 by Giovanni Battista Aleotti. The idea of creating this grand theater came from the Duke of Parma and Piacenza Ranuccio I Farnese. It was part of the complex of the Ducal Palace of Parma. The theatre was almost destroyed by an Allied air raid during World War II (1944). It was rebuilt and reopened in 1962.

It is, along with the Teatro all'antica in Sabbioneta and the Teatro Olimpico in Vicenza, one of only three Renaissance theaters still in existence.

Some claim this as the first permanent proscenium theatre (that is, a theatre in which the audience views the action through a single frame, which is known as the "proscenium arch").
