= Siparium =

Curtain Used in Roman Theatre

In Roman theatre, a siparium was a curtain stretched on the scaenae frons, the back wall of the stage. Human figures were presented on the siparium. When a play started, the siparium was lowered so it would be visible to the audience. At the end of a play, it would be raised again.
