= Scaenae frons =

Architectural background of a Roman theatre stage

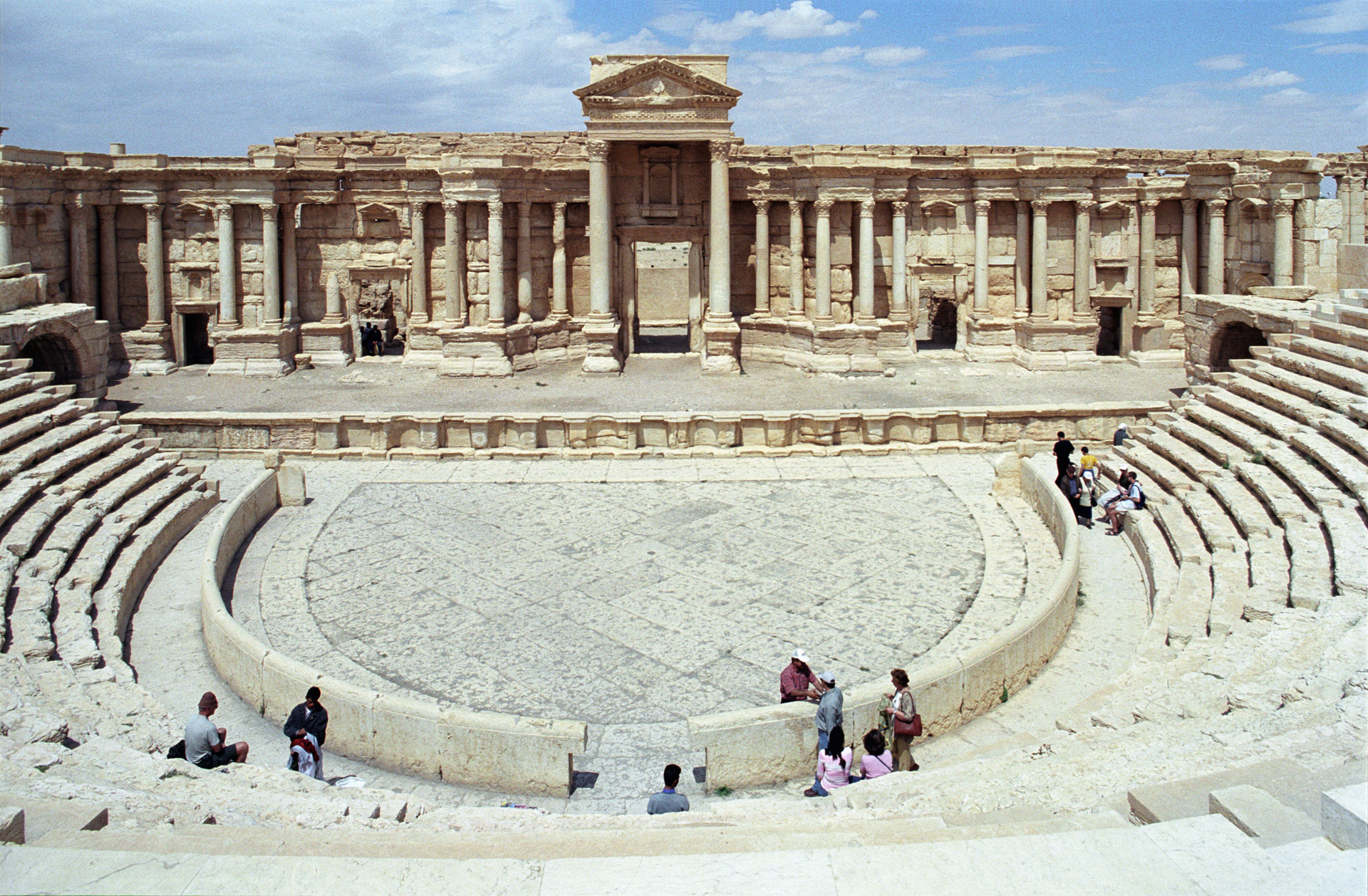
Scaenae frons of the Roman Theatre at Palmyra, before the apparent recent destruction by ISIL

The scaenae frons (Classical Latin: [ˈs̠käe̯näe̯ frõːs̠]) is the elaborately decorated permanent architectural background of a Roman theatre stage. The form may have been intended to resemble the facades of imperial palaces. It could support a permanent roof or awnings. The Roman scaenae frons was also used both as the backdrop to the stage and behind as the actors' dressing room. Largely through reconstruction or restoration, there are a number of well-preserved examples.

This form was influenced by Greek theatre, which had an equivalent but simpler skene building (meaning "tent", showing the original nature of it). This led to the stage or space before the skene being called the proscenium. In the Hellenistic period the skene became more elaborate, perhaps with columns, but also used to support painted scenery.

The Roman scaenae frons was also used both as the backdrop to the stage and behind as the actors' dressing room. It no longer supported painted sets in the Greek manner but relied for effect on elaborate permanent architectural decoration. This achieved a Baroque effect also seen in large nymphaea and library facades, often with an undulating facade, pushing forward and then retreating. All the significant examples date from the Imperial period; the Theatre of Pompey in Rome, completed in 55 BC, was the first stone theatre and probably launched the style.

== Description ==
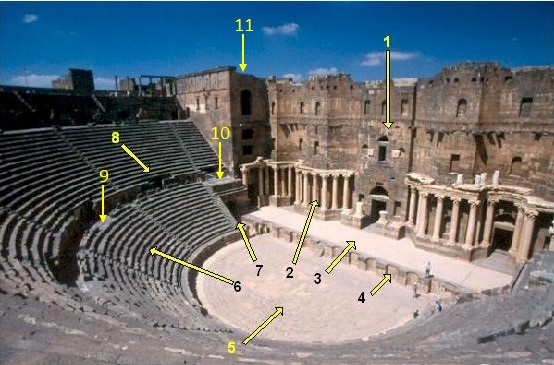
Roman theatre view: 1) Scaenae frons 2) Porticus post scaenam 3) Pulpitum 4) Proscaenium 5) Orchestra 6) Cavea 7) Aditus maximus 8) Vomitorium, Roman theatre of Bosra, Syria

Normally there are three entrances to the stage (Palmyra has five) including a grand central entrance, known as the porta regia or "royal door". The form may have been intended to resemble the facades of imperial palaces. The scaenae frons is often two and sometimes three stories in height and was central to the theatre's visual impact for this was what was seen by a Roman audience at all times. Tiers or balconies were supported by an exuberant display of columns, normally in the Corinthian order, often originally including many statues in niches. A siparium was stretched on the scaenae frons.

In smaller theatres it could support a permanent roof, enclosing the whole theatre, and in larger ones awnings over the whole or parts of the theatre, perhaps secured to masts rising above it, for which there is some evidence.

An inscription in the entablature above the lowest columns often recorded the emperor and others who had helped to fund the construction. A feature often found in the Western Empire, but less so in the Greek-speaking areas, was the row of curved recesses in the face of the front of the stage, as at Sabratha and Leptis Magna.

=== Renaissance ===
The roofed Renaissance Teatro Olimpico ("Olympic Theatre") in Vicenza, northern Italy (1580–1585, designed by Andrea Palladio) includes a fully decorated scaenae frons and gives a good general impression of what the Roman ones would have looked like in their original state, though it is in stucco over a wood framework. The theatre is also famous for the trompe-l'œil scenery, designed by Vincenzo Scamozzi, behind the scaenae frons, which gives the appearance of long streets receding to a distant horizon; it is not clear how much this reflects ancient practice. This was intended to be temporary in 1585, but remains in excellent condition.

== Surviving examples ==
Some well-preserved examples (mostly including some restoration or reconstruction) include:

List
City (Roman name)	City (modern name)	Country	Coordinates	Notes References	Photographs
Sabratha	Sabratha	Libya	32.805371°N 12.485165°E	Restored theatre at Sabratha before WW2, now "the most illuminating preserved example of the scaenae frons".	Theatre at Sabratha
Emerita Augusta	Mérida	Spain	38.915346°N 6.338643°W	Theatre of Emerita Augusta	Theatre of Emerita Augusta as viewed from the upper seats
Palmyra		Syria	34.550768°N 38.268761°E	Roman Theatre at Palmyra	The Roman Theatre at Palmyra
Gerasa (1 of 2)	Jerash	Jordan	32.276789°N 35.889155°E		South Theatre at Gerasa
Gerasa (2 of 2)	Jerash	Jordan	32.282604°N 35.892341°E		North Theatre at Gerasa
Philippopolis	Plovdiv	Bulgaria	42.14678°N 24.75094°E	Plovdiv Roman theatre	
Bostra	Bosra	Syria	32.517650°N 36.481426°E	Roman Theatre at Bosra, see also photo above	Theatre at Bostra
Leptis Magna	Khoms	Libya	32.638399°N 14.290620°E		Theatre at Leptis Magna
Aspendos	Serik, Antalya	Turkey	36.938944°N 31.172296°E	Overall probably the best preserved Roman theatre, but the scaenae frons has lost its decoration, including many statues.	Theatre at Aspendos
Hierapolis	Pamukkale, Denizli	Turkey	37.925°N 29.125833°E	In antiquity the impressive scanae frons had columnades running on three levels and the lateral towers. The first storey was restored in 2010–2012 by Italian architects.	Theatre at Hierapolis
Aurasio	Orange	France	44.13587°N 4.80886°E	The Roman theatre of Orange is a UNESCO World Heritage Site, together with other Roman buildings of the city. Stripped of its decoration.	Orange
Acinipo		Spain	36.831855°N 5.240466°W		Theater of the Roman ruins Acinipo
Volaterrae	Volterra	Italy	43.403611°N 10.86°E		Theatre at Volterra

== See also ==
- Siparium
- List of Roman theatres
