= Teatro Olimpico =

Historic 16th-century theatre in Vicenza, Italy

Coordinates: 45°33′00″N 11°32′57″E

UNESCO World Heritage Site
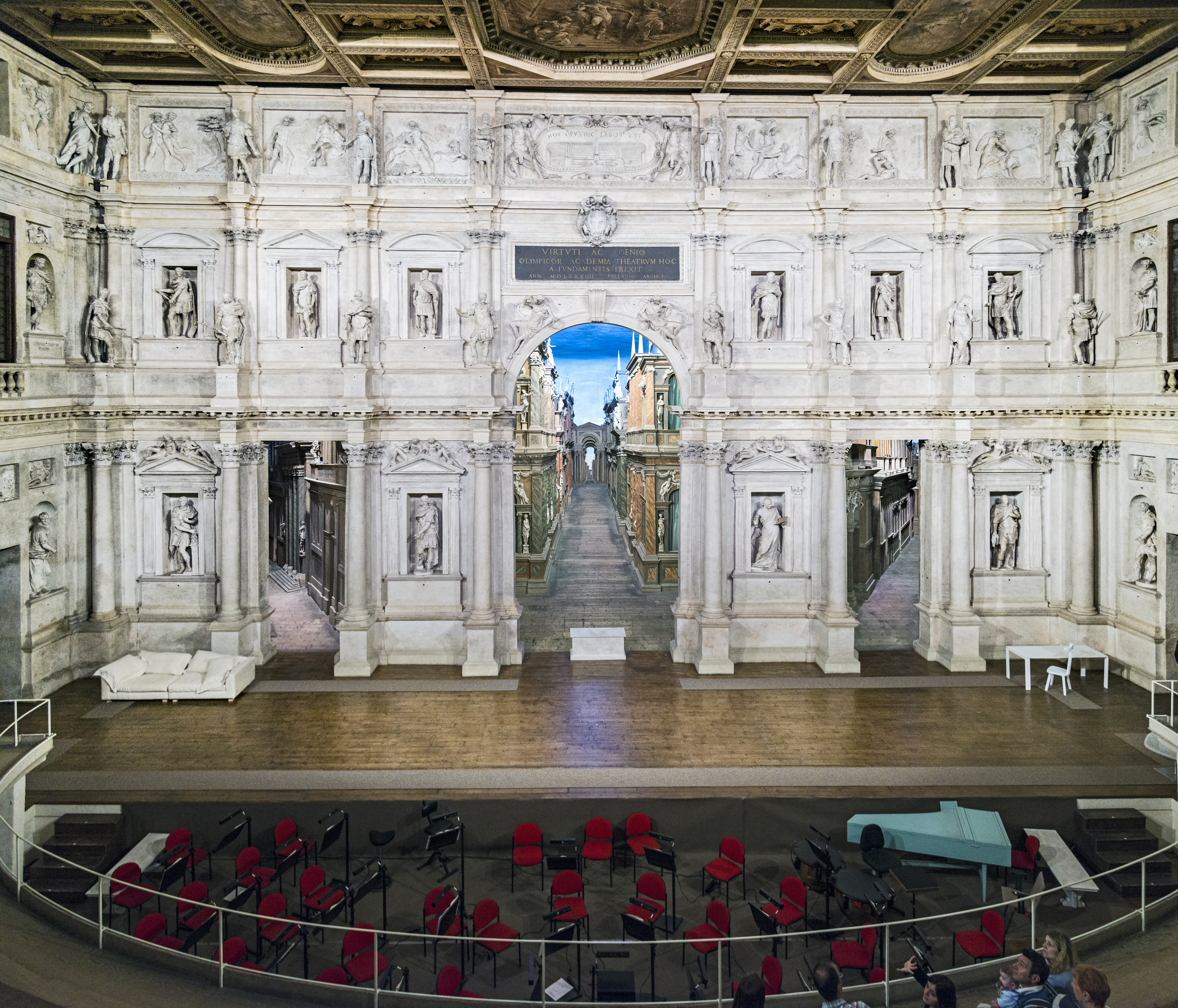
- Teatro Olimpico
- Interactive map of Teatro Olimpico
- Location: Vicenza, Veneto, Italy
- Part of: City of Vicenza and the Palladian Villas of the Veneto
- Criteria: Cultural: (i), (ii)
- Reference: 712bis-024
- Inscription: 1994 (18th Session)
- Extensions: 1996
- Website: Official website

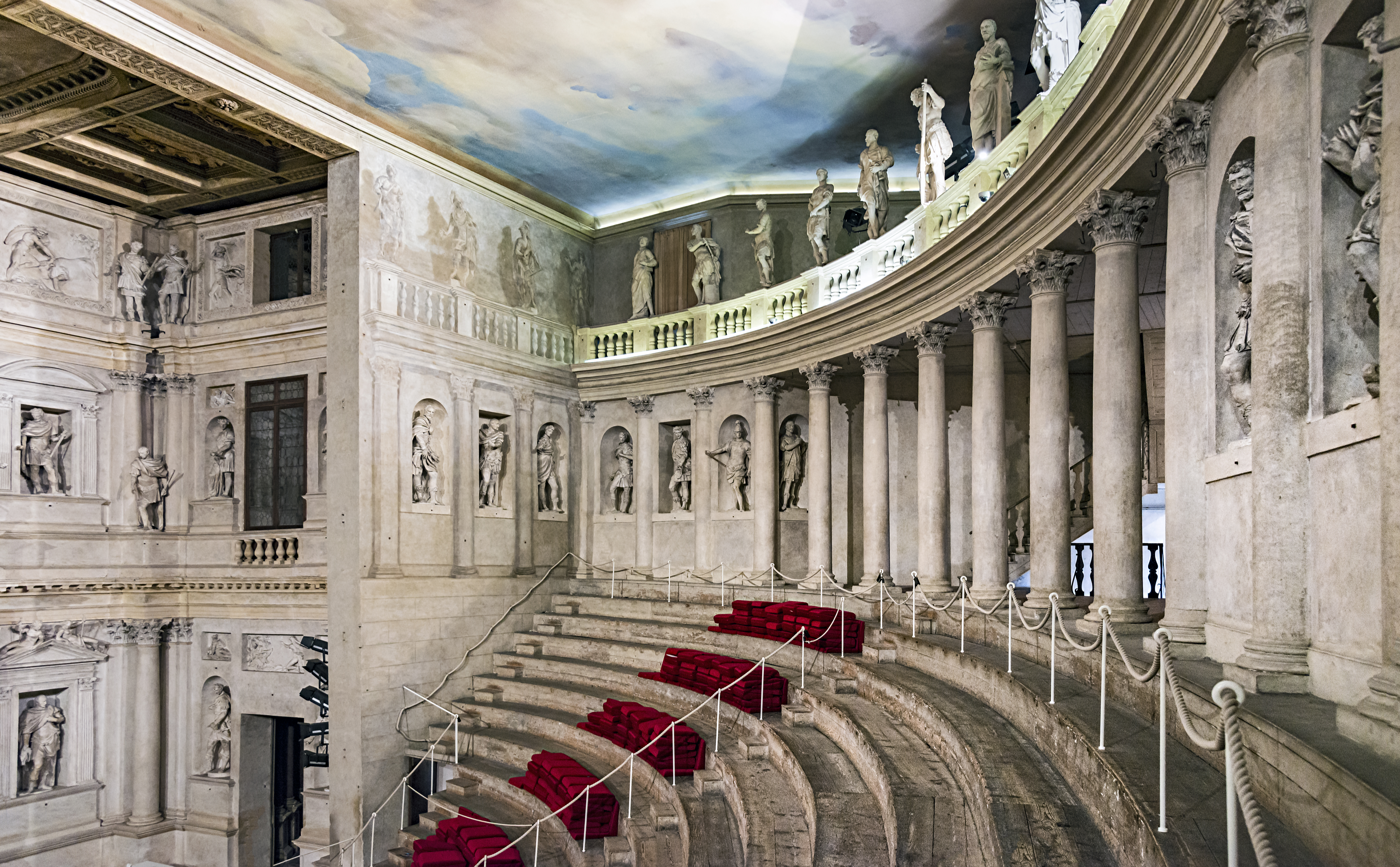
The cavea, or seating area. The loggia or columned portico at the top conceals a staircase (visible in Scamozzi's floor plan) which originally served as the entrance to the cavea.

The Teatro Olimpico ("Olympic Theatre") is a theatre in Vicenza, northern Italy, constructed in 1580–1585. It was the final design by the Italian Renaissance architect Andrea Palladio and was not completed until after his death. The trompe-l'œil onstage scenery, designed by Vincenzo Scamozzi to give the appearance of long streets receding to a distant horizon, was installed in 1585 for the first performance held in the theatre, and is the oldest surviving stage set still in existence. The full Roman-style scaenae frons back screen across the stage is made from wood and stucco imitating marble. It was the home of the Accademia Olimpica, which was founded there in 1555.

The Teatro Olimpico is, along with the Teatro all'antica in Sabbioneta and the Teatro Farnese in Parma, one of only three Renaissance theatres remaining in existence. Both these theatres were based, in large measure, on the Teatro Olimpico. It is still used several times a year.

Since 1994 the Teatro Olimpico, together with other Palladian buildings in and around Vicenza, has been part of the UNESCO World Heritage Site "City of Vicenza and the Palladian Villas of the Veneto".

== Design and construction ==
=== Palladio's vision ===
The Teatro Olimpico is the last work by Palladio, and ranks amongst his highest masterworks. The Vicentine architect had returned to his native city in 1579, bringing with him a lifetime of detailed study into all aspects of ancient Roman architecture, and a more detailed understanding of the architecture of classical theatre than any other living person. Palladio had illustrated Daniele Barbaro's Italian translation of Vitruvius' De architectura; the prints for this edition include floor plans for Roman theatres and an elevation for the scaenae frons of Vicenza's ruined Roman theatre, the Teatro Berga. As well, Palladio's papers include plans for the imagined reconstruction of the ruined Roman theatres in Pola and Verona.

Palladio, a founder of the Olympic Academy (the Accademia Olimpica, created in 1555), had already designed temporary theatre structures at various locations in the city. The most notable of these had been erected some seventeen years previously in the great hall of the Basilica Palladiana.

In 1579, the academy obtained the rights to build a permanent theatre in an old fortress, the Castello del Territorio, which had been turned into a prison and powder magazine before falling into disuse. Palladio was asked to produce a design, and despite the awkward shape of the old fortress, he decided to use the space to recreate an academic reconstruction of the Roman theatres that he had so closely studied. In order to fit a stage and seating area into the wide, shallow space, it was necessary for Palladio to flatten the semicircular seating area of the Roman theatre into an ellipse.

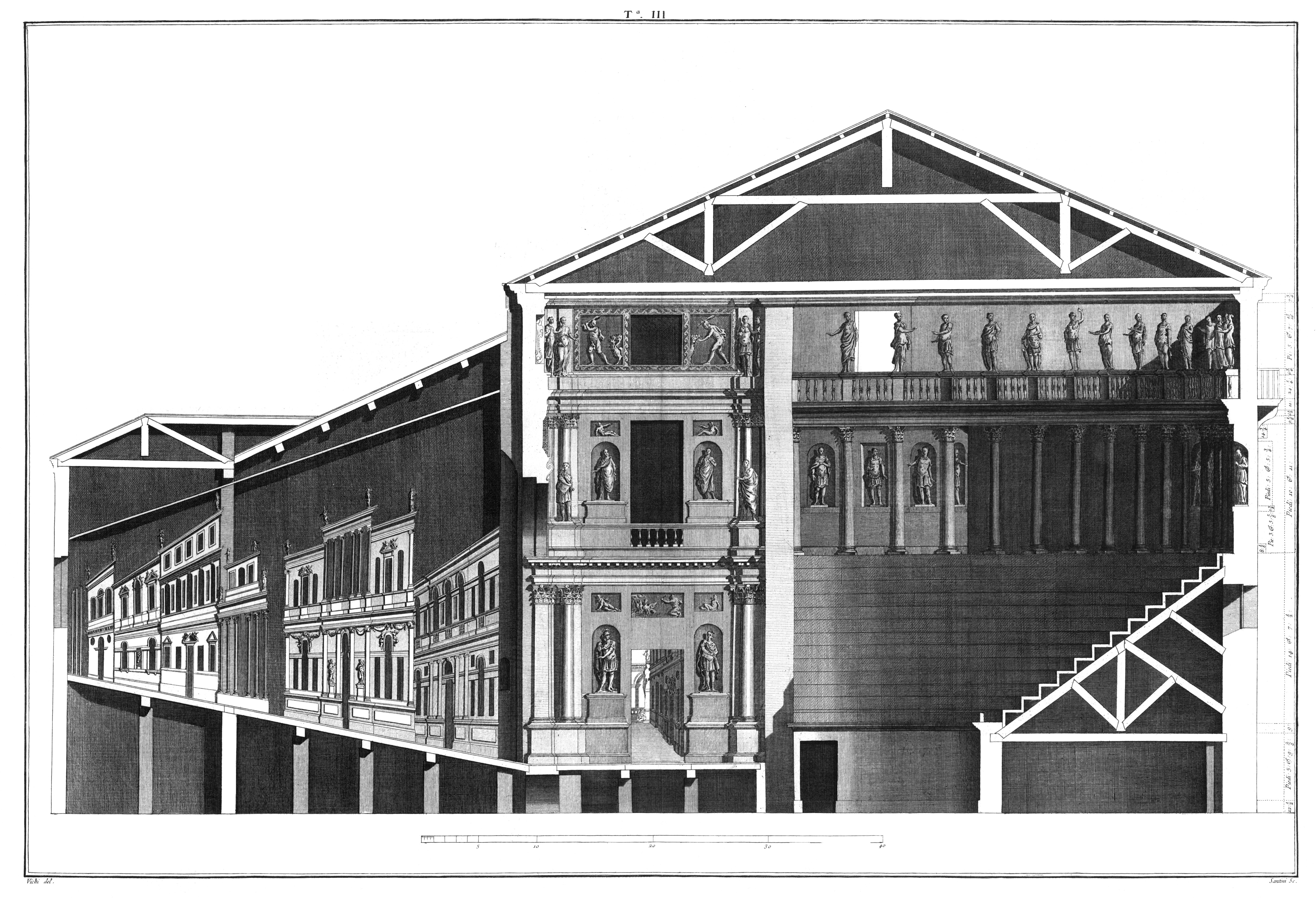
Cross section (drawing by Ottavio Bertotti Scamozzi, 1776)

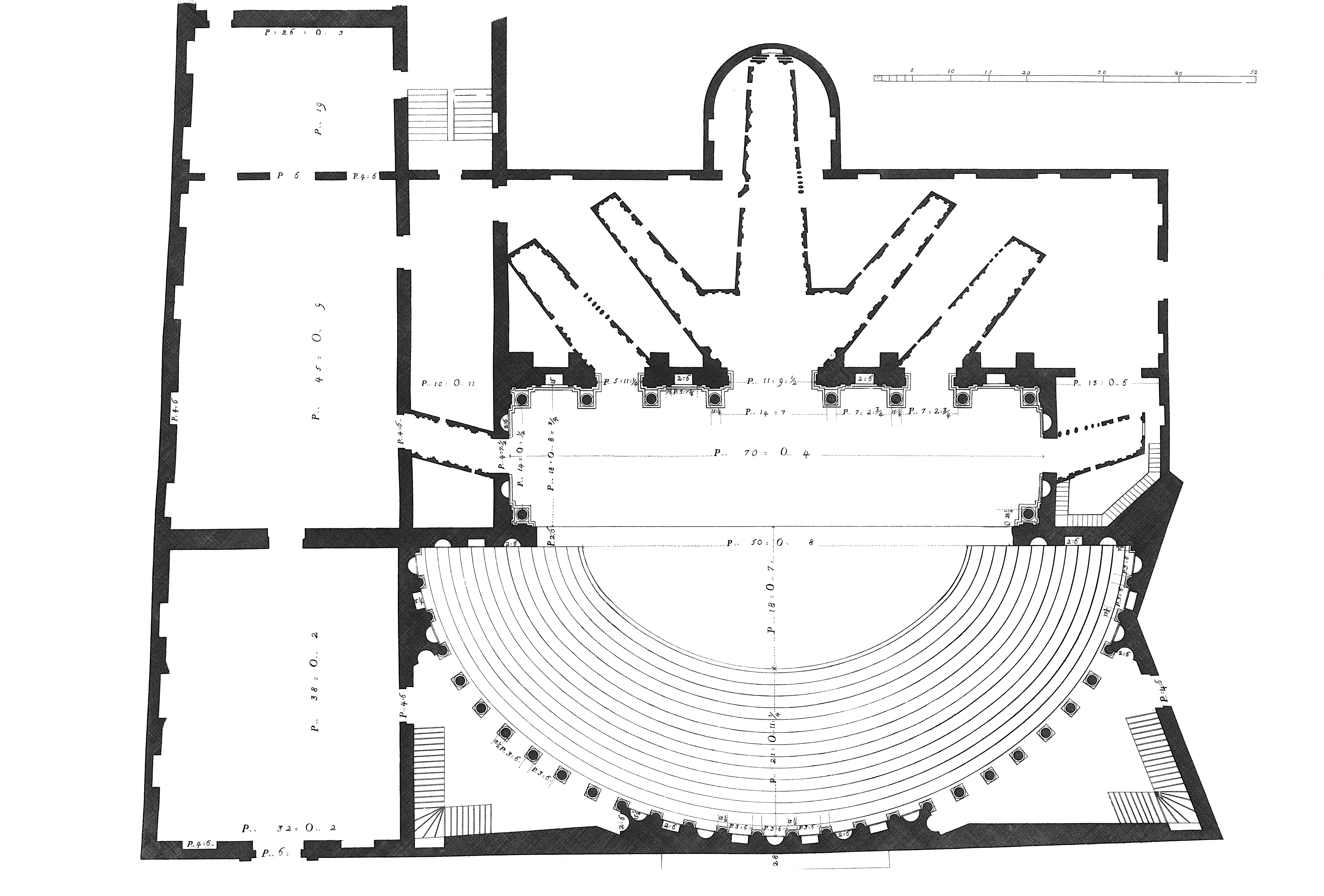
Floor plan (drawing by Ottavio Bertotti Scamozzi, 1776)

=== Scamozzi takes over ===
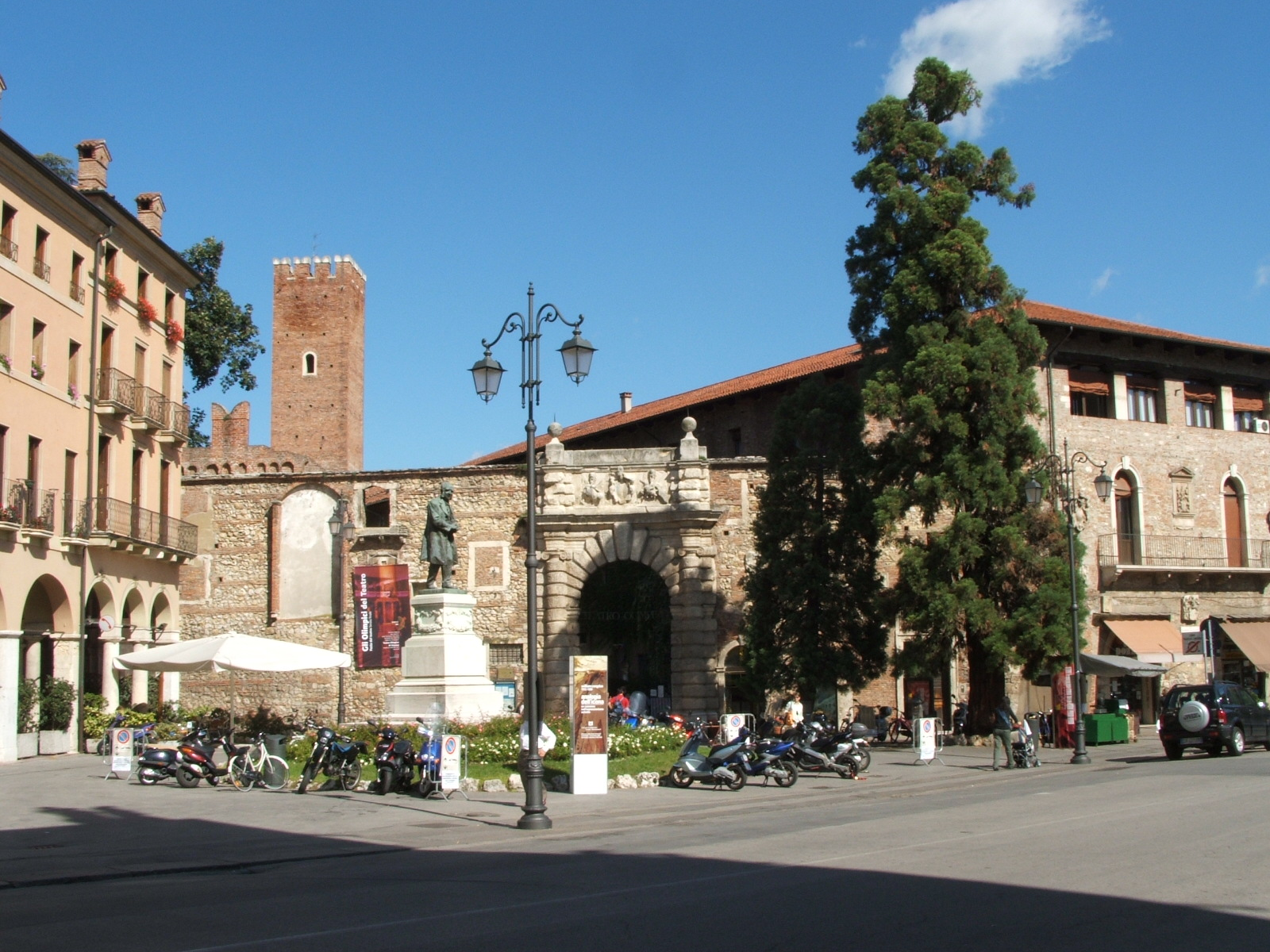
The entrance to the Teatro Olimpico courtyard from Piazza Matteotti. The medieval wall predates the theatre, but the rusticated entrance arch was designed by Scamozzi, and clearly mimics the style and size of the porta regia inside the theatre.

Palladio died in August 1580, only six months after construction had started on the theatre. Still, construction continued with Palladio's sketches and drawings serving as a guide, and Palladio's son, Silla, taking charge of the project. Soon, the other prominent Vicentine architect, Vincenzo Scamozzi, was called upon to complete the project.

Scamozzi had already stepped in to complete Palladio's other great unfinished project, the villa just east of Vicenza that is today known as Villa Capra "La Rotonda". It is a mark of Scamozzi's genius that both these projects are today regarded as being among Palladio's most successfully executed works.

Scamozzi's contributions include the Odèo and Antiodèo rooms, as well as the entrance archway which leads from the street, through an old medieval wall into the courtyard of the old fortress.

In order to make the archway fit with its surroundings, and to prepare visitors to the theatre for the transformation from medieval to classical surroundings, Scamozzi built the archway to be the same size and shape as the porta regia or triumphal arch at the center of the scaenae frons or rear wall of the stage. However, the entrance archway was rusticated to make it fit with the rough and well-worn wall into which it was being inserted.

However, Scamozzi's most famous and most original contribution to the theatre was his elaborate stage set, with its remarkable trompe-l'œil street views. He not only designed the sets, but also put considerable effort into designing the lighting that permitted the make-believe houses of the stage scenery to be lit from within, completing the illusion that these were real streets.

=== Design and construction of the scenery ===
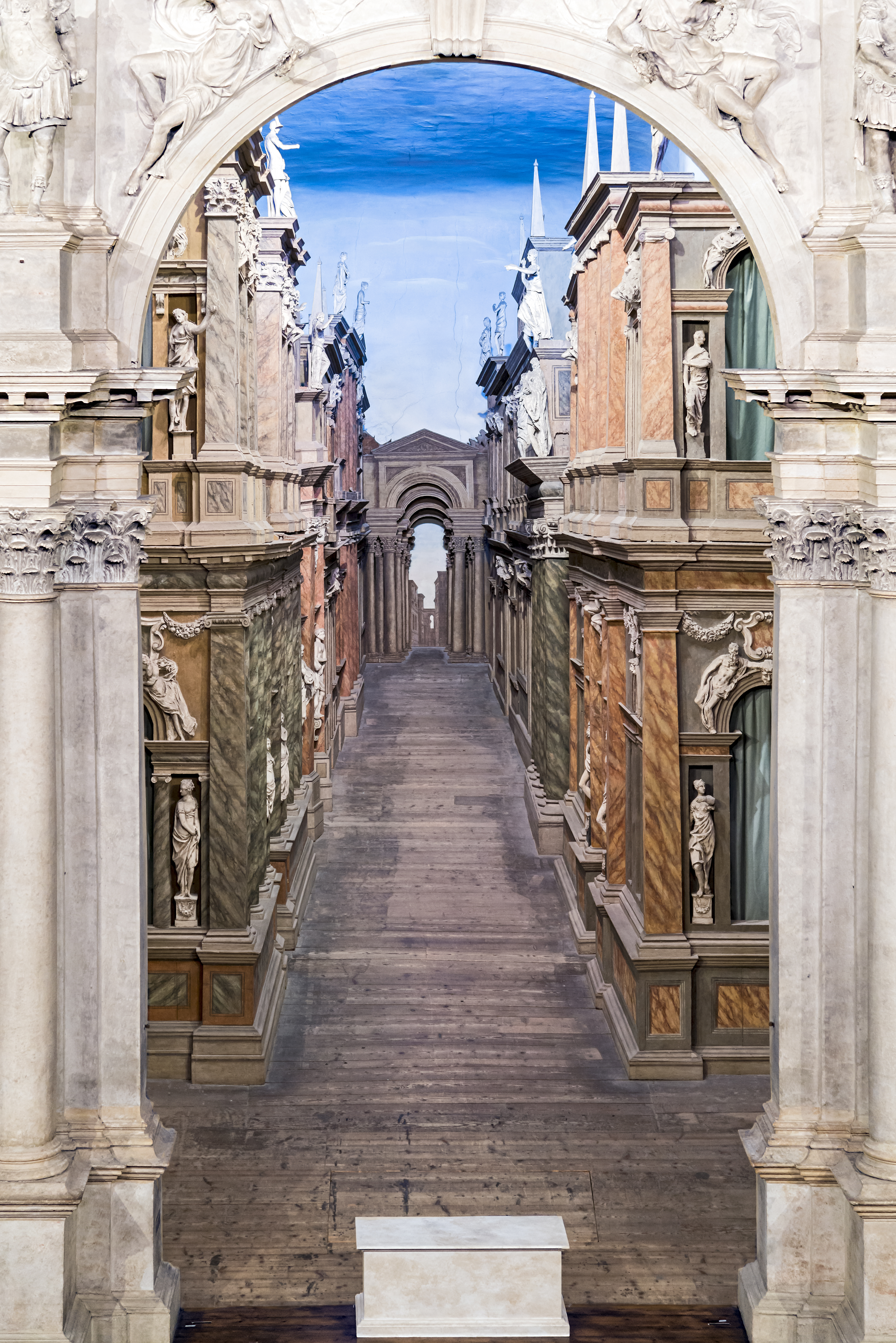
Detail of the wood-and-plaster stage scenery designed by Vincenzo Scamozzi, as viewed through the porta regia of the scaenae frons.

Aside from a single sketch of the scaenae frons, Palladio left no plans as to what kind of scenery should be used onstage. His illustration of an idealized Roman scaenae frons for Barbaro's commentary on the writings of Vitruvius had shown perspective street views similar to those which would later be built in the Teatro Olimpico, but the sketch of the proposed scaenae frons for the Teatro Olimpico shows no such street scenes. The space behind the central archway and the doors to each side is blank.

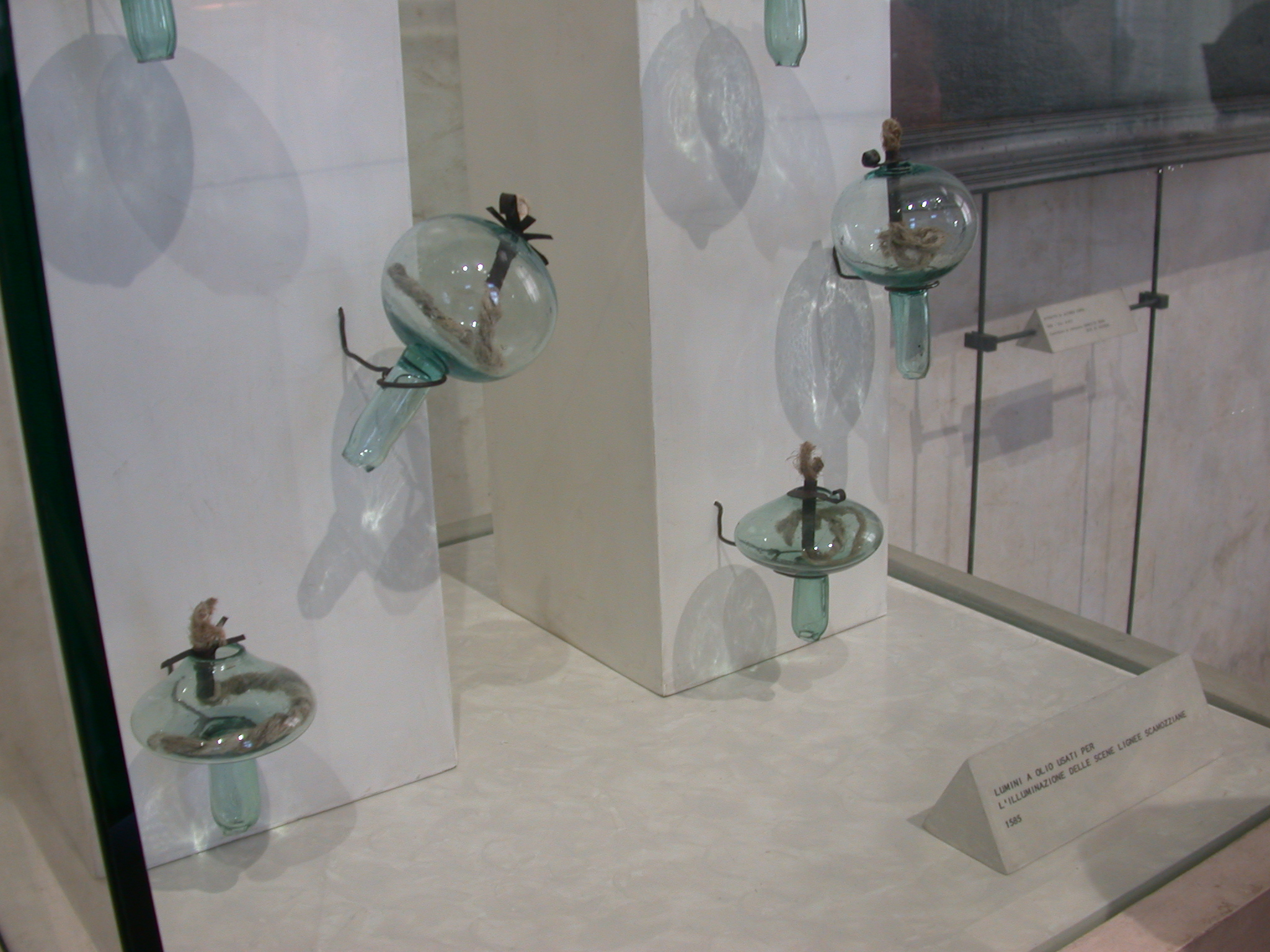
These oil lamps, designed by Scamozzi, were used to create interior lighting for the houses along the imaginary streets, for the very first production.

The simplest explanation for the absence of any street scenes in this drawing is that the academy had not yet obtained the land on which the scenery would later be built. This land was acquired in 1582, after Scamozzi had taken charge of the project. This made it possible to extend the building (including a special apse-shaped projection to accommodate the longest and most elaborate of the seven street views). The academy's petition to the city government for the additional land anticipated that if acquired, the space would be used to create perspective scenery; it explains that the extra land would be used to build a theatre "along the lines laid out by our colleague Palladio, who has designed it to permit perspective views."

Therefore, Palladio can be given credit for having inspired the remarkable perspectives which are visible to the audience through the central archway of the scaenae frons (also known as the porta regia) and also through the smaller side openings, but it is also appropriate to regard Scamozzi as the technical genius behind their remarkably successful execution.

Scamozzi's stage set was the first practical introduction of perspective views into Renaissance theatre. The scenery consists of seven hallways decorated to create the illusion of looking down the streets of a city from classical antiquity. Ancient Thebes, was to be the setting for the first play staged in the theatre. A set of seven extraordinarily realistic trompe-l'œil false perspectives provide the illusion of long street views, while actually the sets recede only a few meters. The way in which seats in all parts of the theatre were provided with at least one perspective view can be seen by observing the theatre floor plan and following the sight lines of audience members in different parts of the theatre.

== History ==
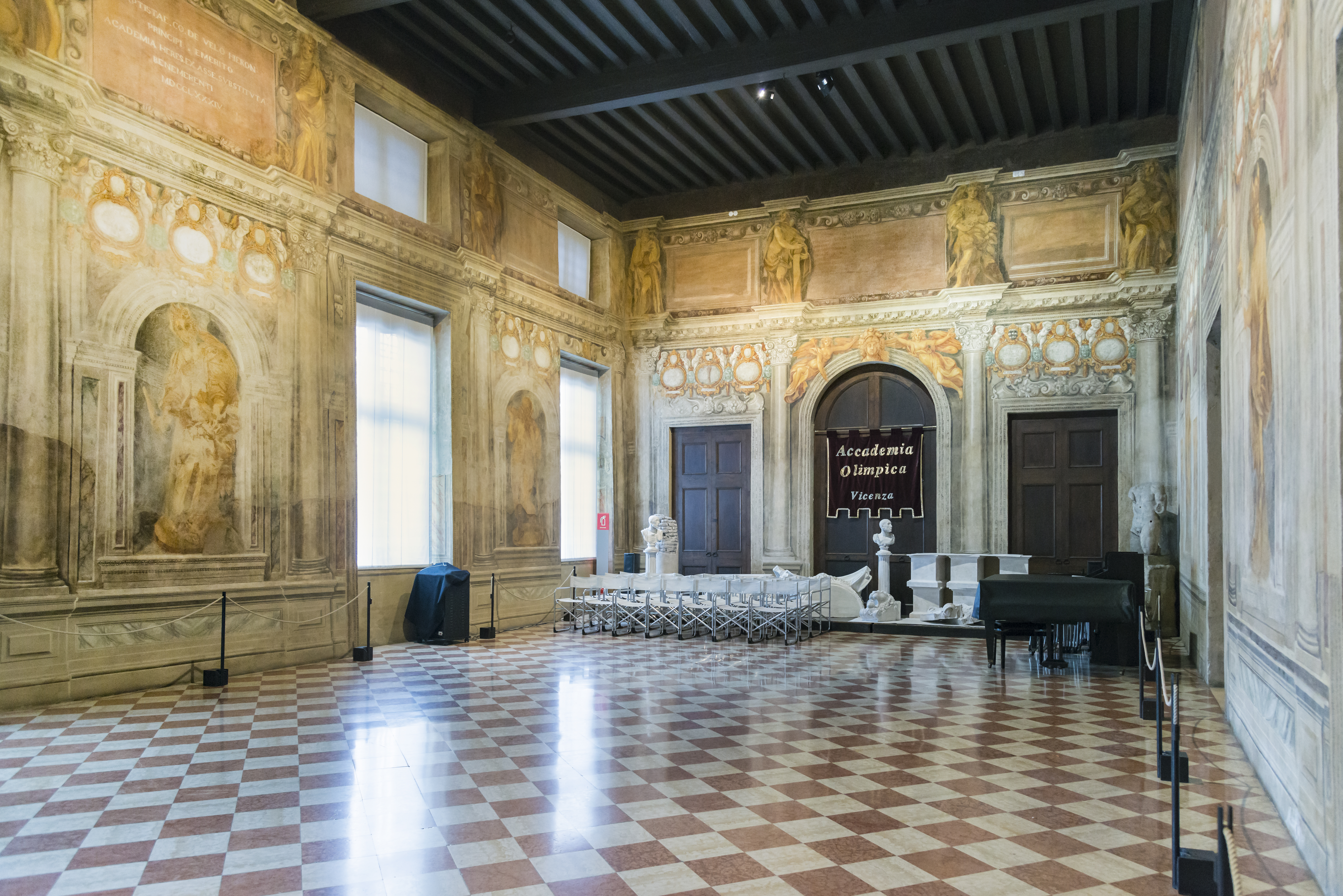
View of the Odeon

The theatre was inaugurated on 3 March 1585 with a production of Sophocles' Oedipus Rex, with music by Andrea Gabrielli. However, the theatre was virtually abandoned after only a few productions. The scenes, which had been created in wood and stucco for Oedipus Rex, and which were meant to represent the streets of Thebes, were never removed: despite bombings and other vicissitudes, they have miraculously preserved into modern times. The original lighting system of glass oil lamps, designed by Scamozzi, heightened the illusion of space, has been used only a few times because of the high cost and the risk of fire. Scamozzi's lighting system was used when, in 1997, the theatre was again employed for a production of Oedipus Rex.

The Teatro Olimpico is still used for plays and musical performances, but audience sizes are limited to 400, for conservation reasons. Performances take place in two theatre seasons:classical plays in the autumn and the festival Il Suono dell'Olimpico in the spring. It is not equipped with heating or air conditioning, which could damage the delicate wooden structures.

The Theatre has been used as a filming location for films such as Don Giovanni (1979) and Casanova (2005).

The Teatro Olimpico hosts the awards ceremony of Dedalo Minosse International Prize for commissioning a building.

Vicenza American High School, a military base located on Caserma Ederle in Vicenza, on occasions used the theater for commencement exercises for the graduating classes for a number of years, including, but not limited to the late 1970s and early 1980s. However, as class sizes significantly increased, they have stopped using the theater for graduation ceremonies.

== Precursors ==
Some authors have incorrectly stated that when the Teatro Olimpico was constructed in 1580–85, it was the first purpose-built theatre in Europe in over a thousand years. In reality, the theatre was one of a number of new permanent theatres being constructed at the time. Records show that permanent theatres were constructed in Ferrara (1531), Rome (1545), Mantua (1549), Bologna (1550), Siena (1561), and Venice (1565). This last theatre was designed by Palladio himself, for the Compagnia della Calza.

== Influence ==
Over the centuries, the Teatro Olimpico has had many admirers, but relatively few imitators. One critic has observed: "In the history of theatre design, the Teatro Olimpico was a temporary hiatus, for succeeding generations adopted the proscenium arch and painterly stage sets. Palladio's ideas are closer to the spirit of the modern theatre, which favors the relationship of audience to action." Another notes: "The rigid form of the scenic arrangements of the Teatro Olimpico [...] precluded any further development," and that the theatre was, in a sense, a prisoner of its creators' emphasis on "considerations of archaeology" and truthfulness to the Roman model. The successful completion of Palladio's experiment in reconstructing the ancient model meant that there was no longer any need to pursue the objective of recovering the Roman past; it was now possible to start making innovations, starting with eliminating the rigid and unchangeable scaenae frons and the unchanging perspective views.

The first theatre to draw inspiration from the Teatro Olimpico, and the one in which its influence is the most obvious, is the Teatro all'antica in Sabbioneta. This theatre, which was designed by Vincenzo Scamozzi, is sometimes also referred to, somewhat confusingly, as the "Teatro Olimpico", and some of its design elements, including most notably the colonnade behind the seating area and the self-conscious references to ancient Rome, are clearly drawn from the original Teatro Olimpico. However, the elaborate scaenae frons is absent in Sabbioneta, and only a single perspective view, along a single street, is employed onstage. As well, the seating area departs radically from Palladio's elliptical plan (perhaps as a result of the much narrower shape of the building in which the theatre is housed).

The English architect Inigo Jones visited the Teatro Olimpico shortly after its completion, and took careful notes, in which he expressed particular admiration for the perspective views: "[T]he chief artifice was that whear so ever you sat you saw one of thes Prospects..."
