= Delbanco =

Delbanco is a surname. Notable people with the surname include:

- Andrew Delbanco (born 1952), American cultural critic
- Francesca Delbanco (born 1974), American novelist and screenwriter
- Miriam Del Banco (1858–1931), American poet and educator
- Nicholas Delbanco (born 1942), American writer
