= 45th Annie Awards =

US media awards ceremony held in 2018

- Date: February 3, 2018
- Site: Royce Hall; Los Angeles, California, U.S.
- Hosted by: Tom Kane
- Organized by: ASIFA-Hollywood

Highlights
- Best Animated Feature: Coco
- Best Direction: Lee Unkrich and Adrian Molina; Coco
- Most awards: Coco (11)
- Most nominations: Coco (13)

The 45th Annual Annie Awards honoring excellence in the field of animation of 2017 took place on February 3, 2018, at the University of California, Los Angeles's Royce Hall in Los Angeles, California, and presented awards in 35 categories.

== Production categories ==
On December 4, 2017, the nominations were announced. Coco earned the most number of nominations with 13, followed by The Breadwinner with 10.

| Best Animated Feature | Best Animated Feature — Independent |
|---|---|
| Coco – Pixar; Captain Underpants: The First Epic Movie – DreamWorks Animation; Cars 3 – Pixar; Despicable Me 3 – Illumination Entertainment; The Boss Baby – DreamWorks Animation | The Breadwinner – Cartoon Saloon, Aircraft Pictures, Melusine Productions; In This Corner of the World – Genco, MAPPA; Loving Vincent – BreakThru Films; Napping Princess – Nippon TV, Signal.MD; The Big Bad Fox and Other Tales... – Folivari, Panique, StudioCanal |
| Best Animated Special Production | Best Animated Short Subject |
| Revolting Rhymes – Magic Light Pictures; Imaginary Friend Society "Feeling Sad" – Hornet; Olaf's Frozen Adventure – Walt Disney Animation Studios; Pig: The Dam Keeper Poems – Tonko House, Inc.; Tangled Before Ever After – Disney Television Animation | Dear Basketball – Glen Keane Productions, Kobe Studios, Believe Entertainment Group; Hedgehog's Home – National Film Board of Canada, Bonobostudio; Negative Space – IKKI Films, Manuel Cam Studio; Scavengers – Titmouse, Inc., Adult Swim; Son of Jaguar – Google Spotlight Stories, Reel FX Creative Studios |
| Best Animated Television/Broadcast Commercial | Best Animated Television/Broadcast Production for Preschool Children |
| June – Broad Reach Pictures, Chromosphere, Lyft; Biscotti. Una Storia Buona – Hornet; League of Legends "Legends Never Die" – Passion Animation Studios; Please the Cheese – Psyop; Sainsbury's "The Greatest Gift" – Passion Animation Studios | The Octonauts – Episode: Operation Deep Freeze – Vampire Squid Productions Limited, a Silvergate Media company, in association with Brown Bag Films; Mickey and the Roadster Racers – Episode: Goofy Gas! – Walt Disney Animation Studios; Peg + Cat – Episode: The Mariachi Problem – The Fred Rogers Company, 100 Chickens Productions; The Stinky & Dirty Show – Episode: HaHaHigher / The Waiting Game – Amazon Studios; Through the Woods – Episode: A Snowy Morning – Houghton Mifflin Harcourt, The Fred Rogers Company, PIP Animation Services |
| Best Animated Television/Broadcast Production for Children | Best General Audience Animated Television/Broadcast Production |
| We Bare Bears – Episode: Panda's Art – Cartoon Network Studios; Buddy Thunderstruck – Episode: Best General Audience Animated Television/Broadcast Production – Stoopid Buddy Studios, Netflix, American Greetings; Lost In Oz – Episode: The Pearl of Pinagree – Amazon Studios; Niko and the Sword of Light – Episode: From the Cliffs of Catastrophe to the Pools of Destiny – Titmouse, Inc., Amazon Studios; Tangled: The Series – Episode: Queen for a Day – Disney Television Animation | Rick and Morty – Episode: Pickle Rick – Williams Street; Big Mouth – Episode: Am I Gay? – Titmouse, Inc., Netflix; BoJack Horseman – Episode: Stupid Piece of Sh*t – Tornante Productions, LLC., Netflix; Robot Chicken – Episode: Freshly Baked: The Robot Chicken Santa Claus Pot Cookie Freakout Special: Special Edition – Stoopid Buddy Studios, Williams Street; Samurai Jack – Episode: XCIII – Williams Street, Cartoon Network Studios |
Best Student Film
Poles Apart – Paloma Baeza; Cradle – Devon Manney; Elsewhere – Junyi Xiao; Good Night, Everybuds – Filmakademie Baden-Wuerttemberg GmbH; Once a Hero – Xia Li

== Individual achievement categories ==
| Outstanding Achievement for Animated Effects in an Animated Production | Outstanding Achievement for Character Animation in an Animated Television / Broadcast Production |
|---|---|
| Shaun Galinak, Dave Hale, Jason Johnston, Carl Kaphan, Keith Daniel Klohn – Coco – Pixar; Richard Baneham, Thrain Shadbolt, Sam Cole, Pavani Rao Boddapati, Daniele Tosti – Avatar Flight of Passage – Walt Disney Imagineering, Weta Digital, Lightstorm Entertainment; Amit Baadkar, Greg Gladstone, Stephen Marshall, Jon Reisch, Tim Speltz – Cars 3 – Pixar; Bruno Chauffard, Frank Baradat, Nicolas Brack, Milo Riccarand – Despicable Me 3 – Illumination Entertainment; Christopher Hendryx, Dan Lund, Mike Navarro, Hiroaki Narita, Steven Chitwood – Olaf's Frozen Adventure – Walt Disney Animation Studios | Chris Su, Bruno Chiou, Yi-Fan Cho, Kevin Jong, Chun-Jung Chu – Trollhunters – DreamWorks Animation Television; Ben Willis – DreamWorks Trolls Holiday – DreamWorks Animation; Kevan Shorey – DreamWorks Trolls Holiday – DreamWorks Animation; Onur Yeldan – DreamWorks Trolls Holiday – DreamWorks Animation; Michael Granberry, Joe Heinen, Rachel Larsen, Hilary Lile, Dan McKenzie – Tumble Leaf – Amazon Studios, Bix Pix Entertainment |
| Outstanding Achievement for Character Animation in an Animated Feature Production | Outstanding Achievement for Character Animation in a Live Action Production |
| John Chun Chiu Lee – Coco – Pixar; Allison Rutland – Coco – Pixar; Marco Nguyen, Benjamin Renner, Patrick Imbert – The Big Bad Fox and Other Tales... Folivari, Panique!, StudioCanal; Bryce McGovern – The Boss Baby – DreamWorks Animation; Rani Naamani – The Boss Baby – DreamWorks Animation | Daniel Barrett, Sidney Kombo-Kintombo, Emile Ghorayeb, Luisma Lavin Peredo, Alessandro Bonora – War for the Planet of the Apes – Chernin Entertainment, River Road Entertainment, 20th Century Fox; Paul Story, Todd Labonte, Matthew Muntean, Cajun Hylton, Georgy Arevshatov – Game of Thrones – Beyond the Wall – Season 7 Episode 6 – HBO; Arslan Elver, Liam Russell, Alvise Avati, Alessandro Cuicci – Guardians of the Galaxy Vol. 2 – Marvel Studios, Walt Disney Pictures; Jance Rubinchik, Adrian Millington, Alberto Martinez Arce, Kyle Winkelman – Kong: Skull Island – Warner Bros., Legendary Entertainment, Tencent Pictures; Andrei Coval, Paul Story, Eric Reynolds, Olivier Lesaint, Artur Vill – Valerian and the City of a Thousand Planets – EuropaCorp, Fundamental Films, Gulf Film, River Road Entertainment |
| Outstanding Achievement for Character Animation in a Video Game | Outstanding Achievement for Character Design in an Animated Television / Broadcast Production |
| Hanna Abi-Hanna – Cuphead – StudioMDHR; Tina Nawrocki – Cuphead – StudioMDHR; Chris Goodall, Jitaik Lim, Kirill Spiridonov – Hellblade: Senua's Sacrifice – Ninja Theory; Richard Oud, Kevin Quaid, Niek Neervens, Jonathan Colin, Peer Lemmers – Horizon Zero Dawn – Guerrilla Games; Almundena Soria, Keith Paciello, Paul Augustus Davies – Uncharted: The Lost Legacy – Naughty Dog | Craig Kellman – Samurai Jack – Episode: XCVI – Cartoon Network Studios, Williams Street; Ryan Wiesbrock, Becky van Cleve, Rob Ronning, Nikki Rice Malki, Felicia Bleu Rose – Buddy Thunderstruck – Episode: Buddy Double / Beaver Dam Fast Pizza – Stoopid Buddy Studios, American Greetings for Netflix; Mike Owens – Danger & Eggs – Episode: Tube of Pain/Broccoli – Amazon Studios; Shane Prigmore, Bobby Pontillas, Taylor Krahenbuhl, Mayumi Nose – Tangled: The Series – Episode: Tangled Before Ever After – Disney Television Animation; Jules Rigolle, Alfredo Torres, Linda Chen, Rustam Hasanov, Alfonso Blaas – Trollhunters – Episode: Escape from the Darklands – DreamWorks Animation Television |
| Outstanding Achievement for Character Design in an Animated Feature Production | Outstanding Achievement for Directing in an Animated Television / Broadcast Production |
| Daniel Arriaga, Daniela Strijleva, Greg Dykstra, Alonso Martinez, Zaruhi Galstyan – Coco – Pixar; Eric Guillon – Despicable Me 3 – Illumination Entertainment; Patrick Mate – Smurfs: The Lost Village – Sony Pictures Animation, Columbia Pictures; Joe Moshier – The Boss Baby – DreamWorks Animation; Reza Riahi, Louise Bagnall, Alice Dieudonné – The Breadwinner – Cartoon Saloon, Aircraft Pictures, Melusine Productions | Dave Wasson, Eddie Trigueros, Alonso Ramirez-Ramos – Mickey Mouse – Episode: The Scariest Story Ever: A Mickey Mouse Halloween Spooktacular! – Disney Television Animation; T. J. Sullivan – Dragons: Race to the Edge – Episode: Sandbusted – DreamWorks Animation Television; Tom Caulfield, Stephen Sandoval – Tangled: The Series – Tangled Before Ever After – Disney Television Animation; Timothy Bailey – The Simpsons – Episode: Treehouse of Horror XXVIII – Gracie Films in association with 20th Century Fox; Andrew Schmidt – Trollhunters – Episode: Unbecoming – DreamWorks Animation Television |
| Outstanding Achievement for Directing in an Animated Feature Production | Outstanding Achievement for Music in an Animated Television / Broadcast Production |
| Lee Unkrich, Adrian Molina – Coco – Pixar; Benjamin Renner, Patrick Imbert – The Big Bad Fox and Other Tales... – Folivari, Panique!, StudioCanal; Tom McGrath – The Boss Baby – DreamWorks Animation; Nora Twomey – The Breadwinner – Cartoon Saloon, Aircraft Pictures, Melusine Productions; Chris McKay – The Lego Batman Movie – Warner Animation Group | Christopher Willis – Mickey Mouse – Episode: The Scariest Story Ever: A Mickey Mouse Halloween Spooktacular! – Disney Television Animation; Alex Geringas – Home: Adventures with Tip & Oh – Episode: Chercphonie – DreamWorks Animation Television; Michael Kramer – Lego Star Wars: The Freemaker Adventures – Episode: Trouble on Tibalt – The Lego Group, Lucasfilm, Wil Film; Mike Reagan, Bob Boyle – The Powerpuff Girls – Episode: Home, Sweet Homesick – Cartoon Network Studios; Lisbeth Scott – Tumble Leaf – Episode: The Nature Of Friendship / The Ship Shop – Amazon Studios, Bix Pix Entertainment |
| Outstanding Achievement for Music in an Animated Feature Production | Outstanding Achievement for Production Design in an Animated Television / Broadcast Production |
| Michael Giacchino, Kristen Anderson-Lopez, Robert Lopez, Germaine Franco, Adrian Molina – Coco – Pixar; Theodore Shapiro – Captain Underpants: The First Epic Movie – DreamWorks Animation; Clint Mansell – Loving Vincent – BreakThru Films; Christophe Beck, Kate Anderson, Elyssa Samsel – Olaf's Frozen Adventure – Walt Disney Animation Studios; Jeff Danna, Mychael Danna – The Breadwinner – Cartoon Saloon, Aircraft Pictures, Melusine Productions | Scott Wills – Samurai Jack – Episode: XCIII – Cartoon Network Studios, Williams Street; Mark Taihei, Ben Plouffe, Chris Whittier, Sylvia Filcak, Amy Chen – Big Hero 6: The Series – Episode: Baymax Returns – Disney Television Animation; Jenny Gase-Baker, Justin Martin – Mickey Mouse – Episode: The Scariest Story Ever: A Mickey Mouse Halloween Spooktacular! – Disney Television Animation; Jasmin Lai, Théo Guignard, Arthur Chaumay, Tiffany Ford, Sylvia Liu – June – Broad Reach Pictures, Chromosphere, Lyft; Amanda Rynda, Larry Murphy, Edgar Duncan, Hallie Wilson, Jared Morgan – The Loud House – Episode: "Tricked!" – Nickelodeon |
| Outstanding Achievement for Production Design in an Animated Feature Production | Outstanding Achievement for Storyboarding in an Animated Television / Broadcast Production |
| Harley Jessup, Danielle Feinberg, Bryn Imagire, Nathaniel McLaughlin, Ernesto Nemesio – Coco – Pixar; Tom Cardone, Arden Chan, Andrew Hickson, Mike Lee, Jason Sadler – Ferdinand – Blue Sky Studios, 20th Century Fox Animation; Florent Masurel, Pierre-Antoine Moelo, Julien Meillard, Jean-Jacques Cournoyer – Leap! – Main Journey; Tomotaka Kubo, Tomoya Imai, Satoko Nakamura – Mary and the Witch's Flower – Studio Ponoc; Ciaran Duffy, Julien Regnard, Daby Zainab Faidhi – The Breadwinner – Cartoon Saloon, Aircraft Pictures, Melusine Productions | Eddie Trigueros – Mickey Mouse – Episode: Bee Inspired – Disney Television Animation; Ben Bury – Home: Adventures with Tip & Oh – Episode: Home for the Holidays – DreamWorks Animation Television; Kim Arndt, Alexandria Kwan – Niko and the Sword of Light – Episode: From the Phantom Woods to the Mountains of Misery – Amazon Studios, Titmouse, Inc.; David Woo – Trollhunters – Episode: "Hero with a Thousand Faces" – DreamWorks Animation Television; Hyunjoo Song – Trollhunters – Episode: "In the Hall of the Gumm-Gumm King" – DreamWorks Animation Television |
| Outstanding Achievement for Storyboarding in an Animated Feature Production | Outstanding Achievement for Voice Acting in an Animated Television / Broadcast Production |
| Dean Kelly – Coco – Pixar; Madeline Sharafian – Coco – Pixar; Glenn Harmon – The Boss Baby – DreamWorks Animation; Julien Regnard – The Breadwinner – Cartoon Saloon, Aircraft Pictures, Melusine Productions; Louie del Carmen – The Star – Sony Pictures Animation, Walden Media | Tom Kenny as the voice of SpongeBob SquarePants – SpongeBob SquarePants – Nickelodeon; Wendie Malick as the voice of Beatrice Horseman – BoJack Horseman – Episode: Time's Arrow – Tornante Productions, LLC for Netflix; Jeremy Rowley as the voice of Bunsen – Bunsen Is a Beast – Nickelodeon; Chris Diamantopoulos as the voice of Mickey Mouse – Mickey Mouse – Episode: The Scariest Story Ever: A Mickey Mouse Halloween Spooktacular! – Disney Television Animation; Nicolas Cantu as the voice of Gumball – The Amazing World of Gumball – Episode: The Grades – Cartoon Network Development Studio Europe |
| Outstanding Achievement for Voice Acting in an Animated Feature Production | Outstanding Achievement for Writing in an Animated Television / Broadcast Production |
| Anthony Gonzalez as the voice of Miguel – Coco – Pixar; Nick Kroll as the voice of Professor Poopypants – Captain Underpants: The First Epic Movie – DreamWorks Animation; Saara Chaudry as the voice of Parvana – The Breadwinner – Cartoon Saloon, Aircraft Pictures, Melusine Productions; Laara Sadiq as the voice of Fattema – The Breadwinner – Cartoon Saloon, Aircraft Pictures, Melusine Productions; Zach Galifianakis as the voice of the Joker – The Lego Batman Movie – Warner Animation Group | Ryan Ridley, Dan Guterman – Rick and Morty – Episode: "The Ricklantis Mixup" – Williams Street; Adam Reed – Archer – Episode: Archer Dreamland: Jane Doe – FX Productions; Darrick Bachman – Mickey Mouse – Episode: Locked in Love – Disney Television Animation; Joshua Pruett – Milo Murphy's Law – Episode: The Island of the Lost Dakotas – Disney Television Animation; AC Bradley, Kevin Hageman, Dan Hageman, Aaron Waltke, Chad Quandt – Trollhunters – Episode: "Escape from the Darklands" – DreamWorks Animation Television |
| Outstanding Achievement for Writing in an Animated Feature Production | Outstanding Achievement for Editorial in an Animated Television / Broadcast Production |
| Adrian Molina, Matthew Aldrich – Coco – Pixar; Dorota Kobiela, Hugh Welchman, Jacek Dehnel – Loving Vincent – BreakThru Films; Riko Sakaguchi, Hiromasa Yonebayashi, David Freedman, Lynda Freedman – Mary and the Witch's Flower – Studio Ponoc; Anita Doron – The Breadwinner – Cartoon Saloon, Aircraft Pictures, Melusine Productions | Paul Douglas – Samurai Jack – Episodes: XCIII, XCIV, XCIX – Cartoon Network Studios, Williams Street; Mark Seymour, Chuck Smith, Eric Davidson – Bob's Burgers – Episode: Bob, Actually – 20th Century Fox Television, Bento Box Entertainment; Jose Martinez – BoJack Horseman – Episode: Stupid Piece of Sh*t – Tornante Productions, LLC. for Netflix; William Rinaldi, Justin Baker – Dinotrux – Episode: "Superchargers" – DreamWorks Animation Television; John Royer – Pickle and Peanut – Episode: Bear-I-cade – Disney Television Animation |
Outstanding Achievement for Editorial in an Animated Feature Production
Steve Bloom, Lee Unkrich, Greg Snyder, Tim Fox – Coco – Pixar; Harry Hitner, Tim Nordquist – Ferdinand – Blue Sky Studios, 20th Century Fox Animation; Darragh Byrne – The Breadwinner – Cartoon Saloon, Aircraft Pictures, Melusine Productions; David Burrows, Matt Villa, John Venzon – The Lego Batman Movie – Warner Animation Group; Pamela Ziegenhagen – The Star – Sony Pictures Animation, Walden Media

== Multiple awards and nominations ==
=== Films ===
The following films received multiple nominations:

| Nominations | Film |
|---|---|
| 13 | Coco |
| 10 | The Breadwinner |
| 6 | The Boss Baby |
| 3 | The Big Bad Fox and Other Tales... |
| 3 | Captain Underpants: The First Epic Movie |
| 3 | Despicable Me 3 |
| 3 | The Lego Batman Movie |
| 3 | Loving Vincent |
| 2 | Cars 3 |
| 2 | Ferdinand |
| 2 | Mary and the Witch's Flower |
| 2 | The Star |

The following films received multiple awards:

| Wins | Film |
|---|---|
| 11 | Coco |

=== Television/Broadcast ===
The following television productions received multiple nominations:

| Nominations | Film |
|---|---|
| 5 | Trollhunters |
| 5 | Mickey Mouse |
| 3 | Bob's Burgers |
| 3 | Samurai Jack |
| 3 | Olaf's Frozen Adventure |
| 3 | Tumble Leaf |
| 3 | BoJack Horseman |
| 3 | Trolls Holiday |
| 2 | Tangled: The Series |

The following television productions received multiple awards:

| Wins | Film |
|---|---|
| 3 | Mickey Mouse |
| 3 | Samurai Jack |
| 2 | Rick and Morty |
