= Nicholas Stoller =

British and American filmmaker (born 1976)

- Born: March 19, 1976 (age 50); London, England
- Education: Harvard College
- Occupations: Director; producer; writer
- Years active: 2000–present
- Spouse: Francesca Delbanco (m. 2005)
- Children: 3
- Relatives: Nicholas Delbanco (father-in-law)

Nicholas Stoller (born March 19, 1976) is an American filmmaker. He is best known for directing the comedy films Forgetting Sarah Marshall (2008), its spin-off/sequel Get Him to the Greek (2010), The Five-Year Engagement (2012), Neighbors (2014), its sequel Neighbors 2: Sorority Rising (2016), and Bros (2022). He also co-wrote the screenplays for the films Fun with Dick and Jane (2005), Yes Man (2008), The Muppets (2011), its sequel Muppets Most Wanted (2014), and Sex Tape (2014), as well as co-creating the television series The Carmichael Show (2015–2017), Friends from College (2017–2019), and Platonic (2023–present).

== Early life ==
Stoller was born on March 19, 1976, in London, to American parents, and was raised in Miami, with his brother, Matt Stoller, a columnist. His mother, Phyllis, is a travel tour operator, and his father, Eric C. Stoller, is a bank executive. Stoller was raised Jewish. He attended high school at St. Paul's, a New Hampshire boarding school. He went on to attend Harvard College and wrote for the comedy publication The Harvard Lampoon, and played for the improv comedy troupe The Immediate Gratification Players while an undergraduate.

== Career ==
From 2000 to 2001, Stoller wrote for Judd Apatow's short-lived Fox television series Undeclared and later co-wrote, again with Apatow, the 2005 comedy Fun with Dick and Jane. Stoller's directorial debut, the 2008 film Forgetting Sarah Marshall, is a romantic comedy starring Jason Segel, Mila Kunis, Jonah Hill, Kristen Bell, Bill Hader and Russell Brand. The film was produced by Apatow Productions and was released by Universal on April 18, 2008.

In 2007, he wrote a single-camera comedy about a new teacher taking a job at the boarding school he once attended. He wrote Yes Man, starring Jim Carrey; the film was produced by Richard Zanuck and David Heyman. Stoller next wrote and directed a new film for Universal and Apatow Productions titled Get Him to the Greek. The film reteamed Stoller and Apatow with Forgetting Sarah Marshall co-stars Jonah Hill and Russell Brand. The film premiered on May 25, 2010, and opened in theaters on June 4, 2010.

In 2008, Stoller and Segel co-wrote The Muppets, the latest film incarnation to feature the characters in nearly 12 years. The film was produced by Walt Disney Pictures and released in 2011. After the film's success, Stoller and the film's director, James Bobin, wrote Muppets Most Wanted, a semi-sequel to the film.

Stoller also directed The Five-Year Engagement (2012), which he co-wrote with Jason Segel, who also starred. Apatow Productions produced the picture, which is about the ups and downs of a couple's five-year engagement. Stoller directed the film Neighbors, its sequel Neighbors 2: Sorority Rising and shared a screenwriting credit on Sex Tape. In 2016, Stoller wrote and directed the animated comedy film Storks for Warner Animation Group.

Along with his wife Francesca Delbanco, Stoller created the comedy series Friends from College, which premiered on Netflix in July 2017. Stoller directed all eight episodes of the first season.

More recently, his Stoller Global Solutions company has renewed an overall deal with Sony Pictures Television.

== Personal life ==
Stoller met Francesca Delbanco (daughter of writer Nicholas Delbanco and granddaughter of cellist Bernard Greenhouse) at a playwriting workshop for Harvard graduates in 2001. They married in 2005 and have three children.

== Filmography ==
=== Films ===
Year	Title	Director	Writer	Producer	Notes
2005	Fun with Dick and Jane	No	Yes	No	
2008	Forgetting Sarah Marshall	Yes	No	No	
2008	Yes Man	No	Yes	No	
2010	Get Him to the Greek	Yes	Yes	Yes	
2010	Gulliver's Travels	No	Yes	No	
2011	The Muppets	No	Yes	Executive	
2012	The Five-Year Engagement	Yes	Yes	Yes	
2014	Muppets Most Wanted	No	Yes	Executive	
2014	Neighbors	Yes	No	No	
2014	Sex Tape	No	Yes	No	
2016	Zoolander 2	No	Yes	No	
2016	Neighbors 2: Sorority Rising	Yes	Yes	No	
2016	Storks	Yes	Yes	Yes	Directed alongside Doug Sweetland
2017	Captain Underpants: The First Epic Movie	No	Yes	No	Also soundtrack writer Song: "Saturday"
2018	Night School	No	Yes	No	
2018	Smallfoot	No	No	Executive	
2019	Dora and the Lost City of Gold	No	Yes	No	
2022	DC League of Super-Pets	No	No	Executive	
2022	Bros	Yes	Yes	Yes	
2024	Incoming	No	No	Yes	
2025	You're Cordially Invited	Yes	Yes	Yes	
2025	Animal Farm	No	Yes	Executive	
TBA	Judgment Day	Yes	Yes	Yes	Post-production

=== Television ===
Year	Title	Director	Writer	Executive producer	Creator	Notes
2000	Strangers with Candy	No	Yes	No	No	Episode "A Price Too High for Riches"
2001–2002	Undeclared	No	Yes	No	No	Multiple episodes, also story editor
2012	Entry Level	Yes	Yes	Yes	No	Unsold pilot
2015	The Carmichael Show	No	Yes	Yes	Yes	
2015	The Grinder	Yes	No	Yes	No	
2017–2019	Friends from College	Yes	Yes	Yes	Yes	
2022	Panhandle	No	Yes	Yes	Yes	
2023–present	Platonic	Yes	Yes	Yes	Yes	
2023–2025	Goosebumps	No	Yes	Yes	Yes	

Appeared as himself

Year	Title	Notes
2010	In the House with Peter Bart & Peter Guber	Episode: Dennis Quaid/Damon Wayans/Nicholas Stoller
2010–2014	Made in Hollywood	Episodes: #5.28 and #9.28
2010–2014	Last Call with Carson Daly	Episodes: Episode dated May 26, 2010, and Nicholas Stoller/Theo Von/Cerebral Ballzy
2014	IMDb: What to Watch	Episode: Neighbors
2014	Just Seen It	Episodes: Neighbors, Interview with Nicholas Stoller, Devil's Knot, The Amazing Spider-Man 2
2025	The Studio	Episodes: "The Promotion", "Casting", "CinemaCon", "The Presentation"

=== Other works ===
Year	Title	Notes
2007	Blades of Glory	Soundtrack writer Song: "Blades of Glory"
2009	Adventureland	Thanks
2011	Big Mommas: Like Father, Like Son	Special thanks
2011	Puss in Boots	Special thanks
2013	Turbo	Additional screenplay material
2016	Grimsby	Special thanks
2017	The Lego Batman Movie	Creative consultant
2017	The Lego Ninjago Movie	Creative consultant
2019	The Lego Movie 2: The Second Part	Creative consultant
2020	Borat Subsequent Moviefilm	Special thanks
