= Cyclus =

Cyclus may refer to:

- Literary cycle
- Cyclus (genus), a genus of prehistoric crustaceans
- Cyclus (installation art), a piece of installation art by Vasko Lipovac
