= Cyclists (film) =

2018 Croatian-French animated short film

- Poster
- Directed by: Veljko Popović
- Production companies: Lemonade3d; Bagan Films; 3D2D Animatori
- Distributed by: Bonobostudio
- Release date: January 2018 (Annecy)
- Running time: 8 minutes
- Countries: Croatia; France
- Language: Croatian

Cyclists is a 2018 Croatian-French animated short film by Veljko Popović, internationally co-produced and distributed by Bonobostudio.

== Synopsis ==
The short is described as a comedy set in a small Mediterranean town, having unique aesthetics with vivid colors of summer as inspired by the art of Vasko Lipovac. The idea derived from a notable installation of 60 cyclists by the artist. The cycling season is nearing its grand finale. During the final race, the two men in the lead are competing for more than the Grand Trophy; they are fighting for the affection of a lady and fulfilment of their erotic fantasies. It is described as "In a small town next to the sea in Croatia, the cycling season is at its peak. During the final race the two leaders are not just battling for the grand prize, but also for the affection of a lady and fulfillment of their erotic fantasy."

== Development ==
Veljko Popović closely studied Vasko Lipovac's art and variously experimented with CGI and 3D animation, trying to create character poses not seen in his art.

== Reception ==
The short premiered at Animafest in June 2018, where it won the award for Best Croatian Film. It won further awards at Hiroshima International Animation Festival, Betina Film Festival, Linoleum Festival and Croatian Film Days as well as getting a Jury Award at Annecy. It was a staff pick at Vimeo and daily pick at Cartoon Brew. In 2023 the short was selected for the international competition of the 17th International Cycling Film Festival.

=== Awards ===
- Annecy (jury distinction for short film, 2018)
- Hiroshima (special prize, 2018)
- Animafest Zagreb (best Croatian film, 2018)
- Krok (grand prix, 2018).
