= Red (2010 soundtrack) =

Red (Original Motion Picture Score)

Film score by Christophe Beck
- Released: October 12, 2010
- Recorded: 2010
- Genre: Film score
- Length: 39:47
- Label: Lakeshore
- Producer: Christophe Beck

Christophe Beck chronology
Death at a Funeral (2010)	Red (2010)	Due Date (2010)

Red (Original Motion Picture Score) is the film score to the 2013 film Red directed by Robert Schwentke loosely inspired by the DC Comics limited series of the same name, and stars Bruce Willis, Morgan Freeman, John Malkovich, Helen Mirren, Karl Urban, and Mary-Louise Parker, alongside Rebecca Pidgeon, Brian Cox, Richard Dreyfuss, Julian McMahon, Ernest Borgnine, and James Remar. The film score is composed by Christophe Beck and released through Lakeshore Records on October 12, 2010.

== Background ==
Christophe Beck composed the film score for Red, collaborating with Schwentke for the first time. He considered it to be "craziest production situation" he had ever been where he had to write the score within four weeks. Around 80 minutes of music had been composed with each cue having orchestra, drums, guitars, bass and synthesizers.

== Release ==
The album was released through Lakeshore Records on October 12, 2010. All the track titles cues have three letter words, beginning with R, E and D, the name of the film.

== Track listing ==
No.	Title	Length
1.	"Retired Extremely Dangerous"	2:26
2.	"Rotating Enforcement Device"	1:42
3.	"Radical Early Discovery"	3:29
4.	"Rapidly, Executioners Destroyed"	0:31
5.	"Regular Easygoing Dudes"	1:01
6.	"Rockets Eagerly Dispatched"	1:33
7.	"Realtor's Explosive Death"	1:08
8.	"Russian Embassy Divertimento"	1:43
9.	"Rendezvous, Encounter, Discussion"	0:41
10.	"Rocking Escape Ditty"	2:28
11.	"Rehash Every Detail"	2:12
12.	"RED Evades Dunning"	1:03
13.	"Reluctant Execution Decision"	2:07
14.	"Ridiculously Extravagant Disguises"	2:09
15.	"Revenge Es Delicioso"	3:13
16.	"Really Elegant Diversion"	1:59
17.	"Rescuing Ex-Agents Daily"	2:00
18.	"Ruined Election Dinner"	4:19
19.	"Restraining Elected Dignitaries"	3:04
20.	"Relieved Embrace, Done"	0:59
Total length:		39:47

== Critical reception ==
Justin Chang of Variety wrote "Christophe Beck's low-key score amusingly suggests that of a Bond movie on Prozac." John DeFore of The Hollywood Reporter and Kenneth Turan of Los Angeles Times described it as "bombastic" and "exciting". Chris Bumbray of JoBlo.com wrote "the sitcom-style score by Christopher Beck was weak and too jokey."

== Additional music ==
The following songs are featured in the soundtrack:

- "Home in Your Heart" – written by Otis Blackwell and Winfield Scott; performed by Solomon Burke
- "Doctor, My Eyes" – written and performed by Jackson Browne
- "Back in the Saddle" – written by Tyler/Perry; performed by Aerosmith
- "Cissy Strut" – written by Joseph Modeliste Jr., George Joseph Porter Jr., Arthur Lanon Neville and Leo Nocentelli; performed by The Meters
- "I Want to Be Loved" – written by Willie Dixon; performed by Muddy Waters
- "Sunrise in China" – written and performed by Scott Seegert
- "Emergency" (from Two Weeks Notice (2002)) – composed by John Powell
- "Carry On Christmas" – written by David Molyneux Courtesy of De Wolfe Music USA
- "Remember" – written by Irving Berlin; performed by The George Kash/John Marmora Band
- "Calling All Units to Broccolino" – written by Massimo Martellotta; performed by Calibro 35

== Accolades ==
Awards	Category	Recipient(s) and nominee(s)	Result	Ref.
ASCAP Film and Television Music Awards	Top Box Office Films	Christophe Beck	Won	
International Film Music Critics Association	Best Original Score for an Action/Adventure/Thriller Film	Christophe Beck	Nominated	
