= Vasko Lipovac =

Yugoslavian and Croatian artist

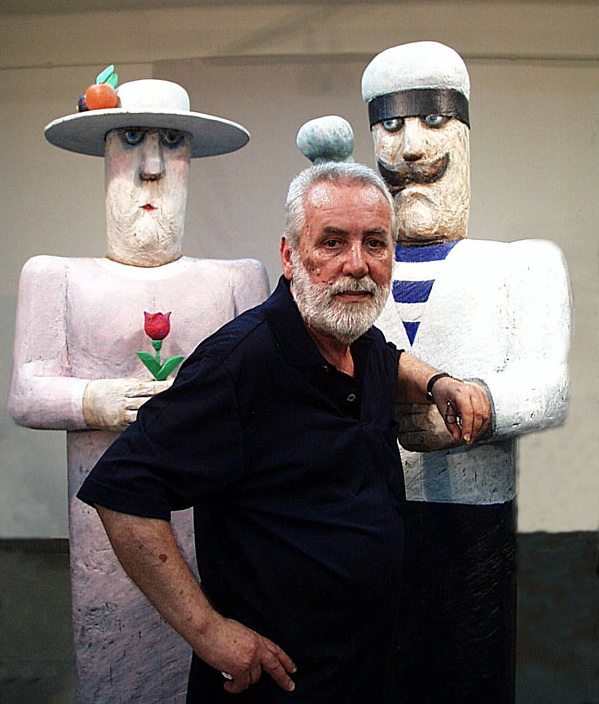
- Vasko Lipovac
- Born: 14 June 1931; Kotor, Yugoslavia (now Montenegro)
- Died: 4 July 2006 (aged 75); Split, Republic of Croatia
- Education: Academy of Applied Arts, Zagreb; Academy of Fine Arts, Zagreb; Kosta Angeli Radovani; Željko Hegedušić; Krsto Hegedušić
- Known for: Sculpture, Painting, Drawing, Printmaking, Illustration, Scenography
- Notable work: Woman with a Cat (1955); The life of Blessed Osanna of Cattaro, bronze doors for the church of St. Mary in Kotor (1989); Cyclus (installation art) (1996)
- Awards: Emanuel Vidović Lifetime Achievement Award; Order of Danica Hrvatska with the image of Marko Marulić

Vasko Lipovac (14 June 1931 – 4 July 2006) was a Yugoslavian and Croatian painter, sculptor, printmaker, designer, illustrator and scenographer and one of the most prominent artists of the region. He is best known for his minimalist figuration and use of intense, unmodulated and often dissonant palette. With the exception of his juvenile period of geometric abstraction, he remained loyal to figuration throughout his whole career. Exceptionally prolific, he worked in various techniques and was equally skilful in using high-polished metal, polychromous wood, enamel, terracotta or polyester to create his sculptures, reliefs and mobiles.

== Biography ==
Vasilije Vasko Lipovac was born on June 14, 1931, in Škaljari, a small coastal settlement near Kotor in Montenegro. He was the youngest of five children in a very harmonious family of a prosperous merchant and a shipping agent Spasoje Lipovac and Antica Lui, the daughter of a respectable landowner Maksimilijan Lui. He attended Real Grammar School in Kotor, where his drawing teacher was Mato Đuranović (1895–1973), the painter who inspired his students with the bright, shiny colors of his works.

After graduating from the secondary school, he moved to Zagreb, Croatia in 1950 and enrolled in the Academy of Applied Arts. During this period of the early 1950s, many future prominent artists attended Zagreb Academy of Applied Arts, such as Zlatko Bourek, Jagoda Buić, Ante Sony Jakić, Zvonimir Lončarić, Mladen Pejaković, Ordan Petlevski and Pavao Štalter. Lipovac initially chose sculpture, in the class of Kosta Angeli Radovani, but during sophomore year (1951/1952) he switched to painting, where his mentor became Željko Hegedušić. In his final year at the Academy Lipovac created his first notable work, a stained glass "Woman with a Cat", now part of the Museum of Arts and Crafts collection.

After graduation, from 1955 to 1959 Lipovac attended the Master's Workshop of professor Krsto Hegedušić. This postgraduate study gave many talented young visual artists, as diverse as Miroslav Šutej and Marina Abramović, much needed freedom and opportunity to explore and use their artistic sensibility. Shortly after joining workshop Lipovac started abstracting human figures, as well as their surroundings, to simple geometric shapes that became a hallmark of his work in following decades. Continuous strides towards radical stylization lead him to a short but very successful foray into geometric abstraction. Towards the end of Lipovac's postgraduate study the Workshop was visited by Peggy Guggenheim, who bought one of his works. This episode was finished off at the end of 1950s with an exhibition in City of York Art Gallery, together with Ordan Petlevski. The exhibition was curated by Hans Hess, and received a positive review from Herbert Read.

In 1959 he married Milena Matas, and they later had three sons. He spent most of the 1960 in the army, and upon returning to Zagreb he spent a year (1964–1966) as an art editor assistant in the magazine “Chemistry in industry”, which was the only full-time job he ever had. In 1965 he had the first solo exhibition, in the Museum of Fine Arts in Split; the exhibition was curated by Kruno Prijatelj, with whom Lipovac established close collaboration over the next two decades, resulting in numerous projects and exhibitions. Writing in the catalogue for Lipovac’s 1966 Dubrovnik exhibition, poet and dissident Vlado Gotovac identified the elegiac mood of the artist’s mid-1960s work, describing it as a world on the brink of disappearance, fading away.

Since 1967, Vasko Lipovac lived and worked in Split, Croatia, where the Mediterranean climate inspired him to fulfil his poetic vision, and to create numerous works. Four thematic units have been detected in the work of Lipovac, namely the Mediterranean, sports, the sacral and erotic.

During the whole course of his active life he carried within himself the images of the native landscape of Boka Kotorska and the rich cultural heritage of his home town, while his education in Zagreb provided him with an access to the essential experiences of modernism and figurative autonomy, especially thanks to Kosta Angeli Radovani. So in his work, apart from the early abstract phase, he tried to affirm the contemporary anthropomorphic and associative sculpture and figurative painting, succeeding in evoking the figures and ambiances of recognizably Mediterranean descent. No matter how stylized, that figure is full of life, just like a human being who works, thinks, feels... Regarding the exhibition of paintings and sculptures by Vasko Lipovac in Split, Tonči Petrasov Marović said: "Vasko not only knows what he wants, but he also has the skill and the power to achieve what he wants."

He was intrigued by the idea of integrating art with architecture, and especially integration of art into workspace, so he collaborated with numerous architects. Among his most prominent are the collaborations with Bernardo Bernardi (hr), Julije De Luca (hr), Ante Rožić (hr), Vjekoslav Ivanišević, Dinko Kovačić (hr), Lovro Perković (hr), Jerko Rošin (hr), and Ivan Vulić.

Lipovac was twice part of the team, led by architect Branko Silađin, that conceived and designed national pavilions for the World Exhibition. He made paintings that flanked the entrance of the pavilion for Expo '98 in Lisbon, and designed the exterior of the pavilion for Expo 2000 in Hanover, in his trademark minimalist style. Both pavilions are considered to be among the best in their respective Expos, and the pavilion for Hanover Expo was included in the 2010 exhibition Architecture as Landscape: A Morphology of Contemporary Croatian Architecture at London Festival of Architecture.

A prolific artist who worked across multiple techniques and mediums - including polished metal, polychrome wood, enamel, terracotta, and polyester - his output included sculptures, reliefs, and mobiles, as well as drawing, painting, printmaking, design, illustration, and set and costume design. Over the course of his career, he participated in nearly 100 solo exhibitions and over 200 group, juried, and invitational exhibitions in Croatia and internationally. He received over 20 awards and honors for his work in sculpture, painting, printmaking, illustration, and public monuments, including a lifetime achievement award from Slobodna Delmacija in May 2006.

Vasko Lipovac died on July 4, 2006.

In 2015 University of Split's art gallery was renamed University Gallery "Vasko Lipovac".

== Photos ==
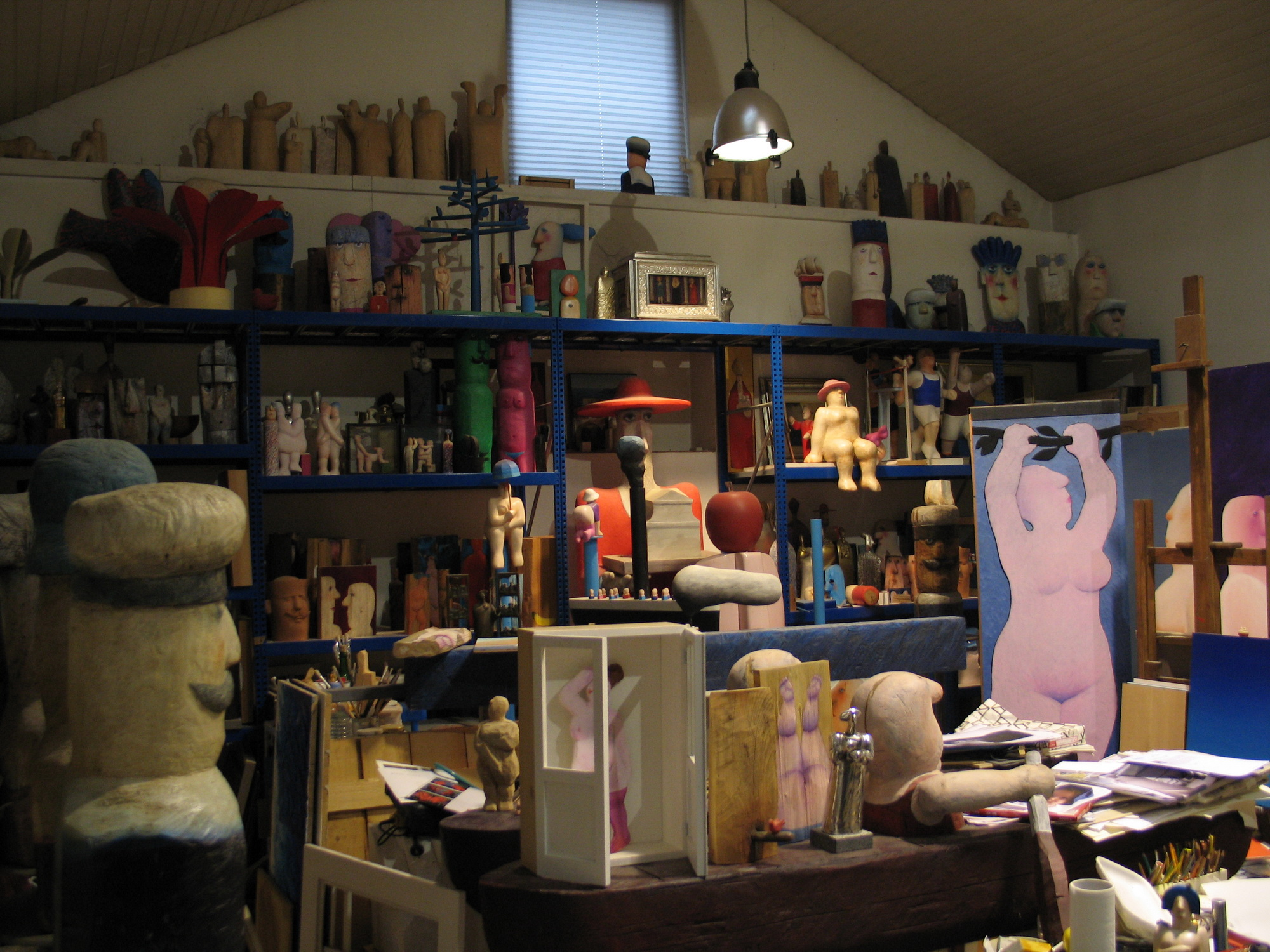
Atelier, detail (2005)

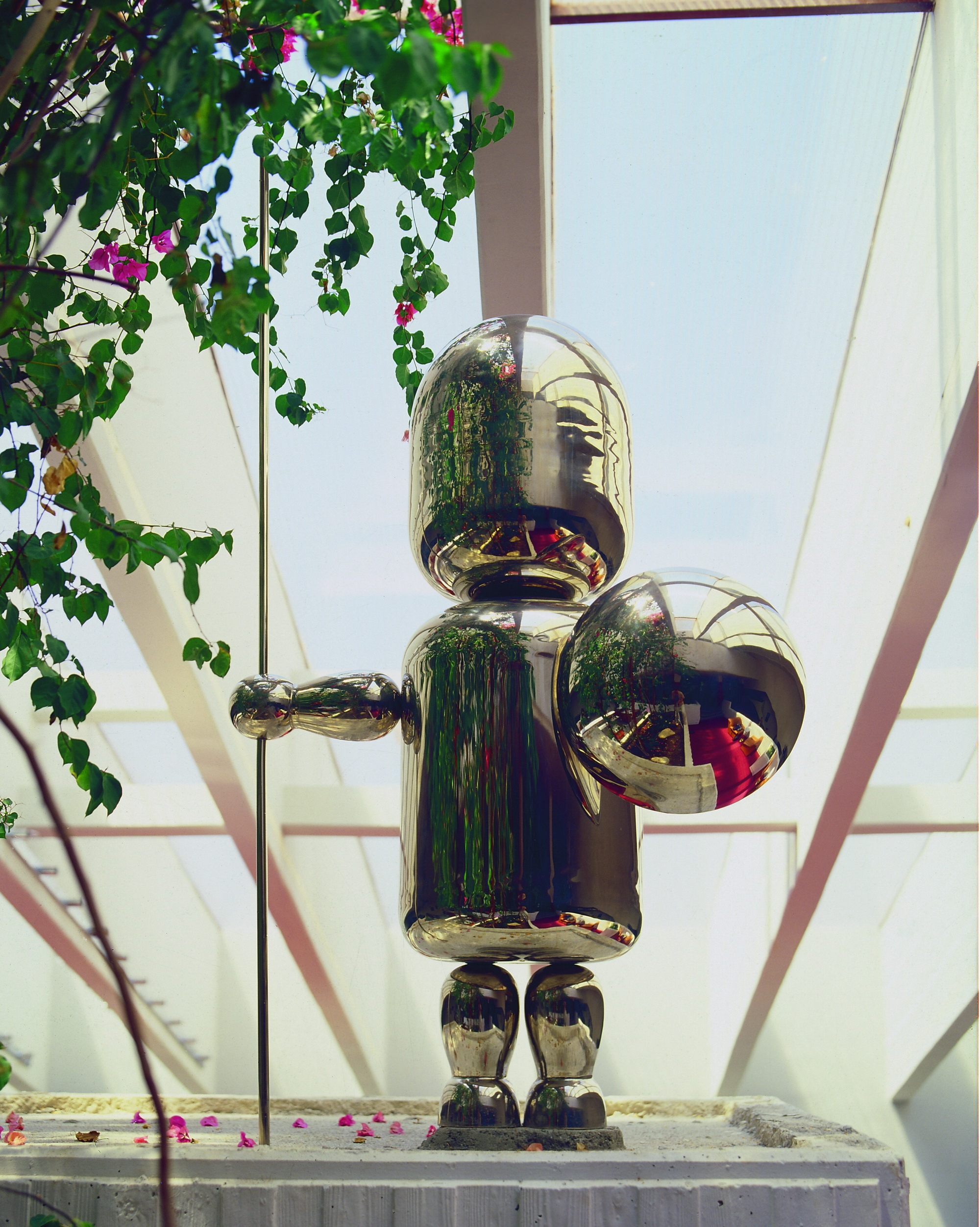
Knight (1978), Hotel President, Dubrovnik

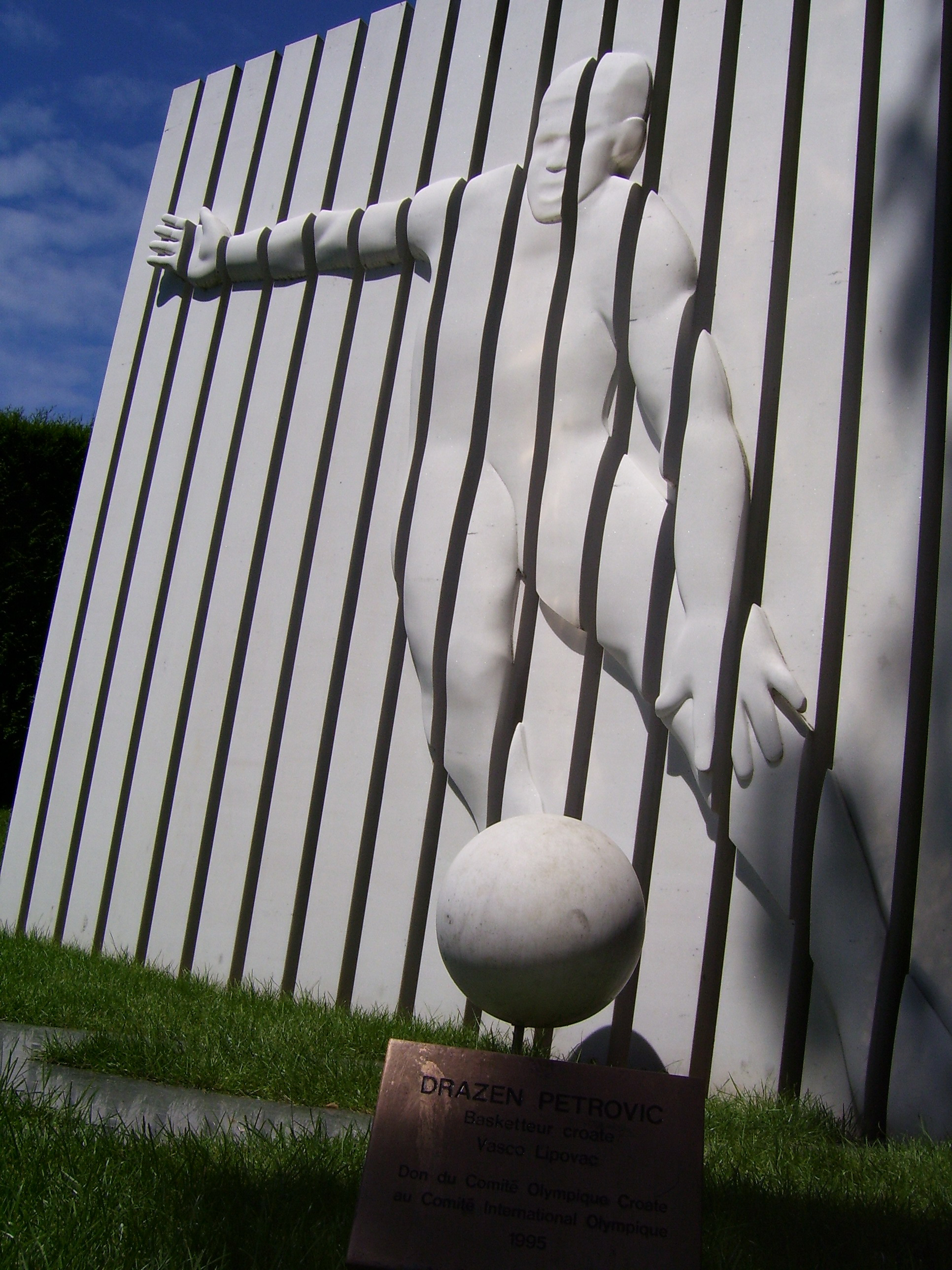
Dražen Petrović's monument in Olympic Museum Lausanne

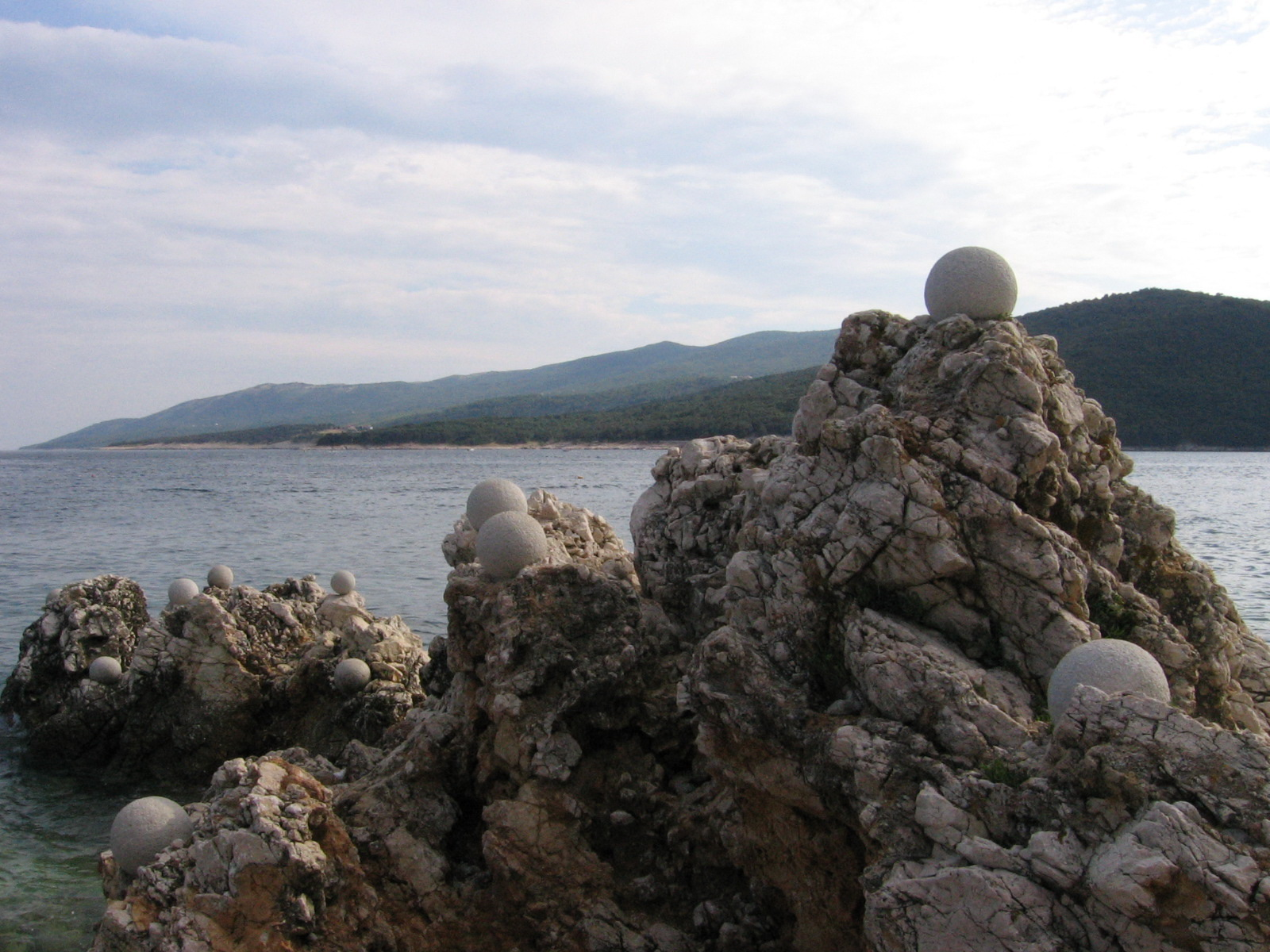
Perls (1996), Rabac, Croatia

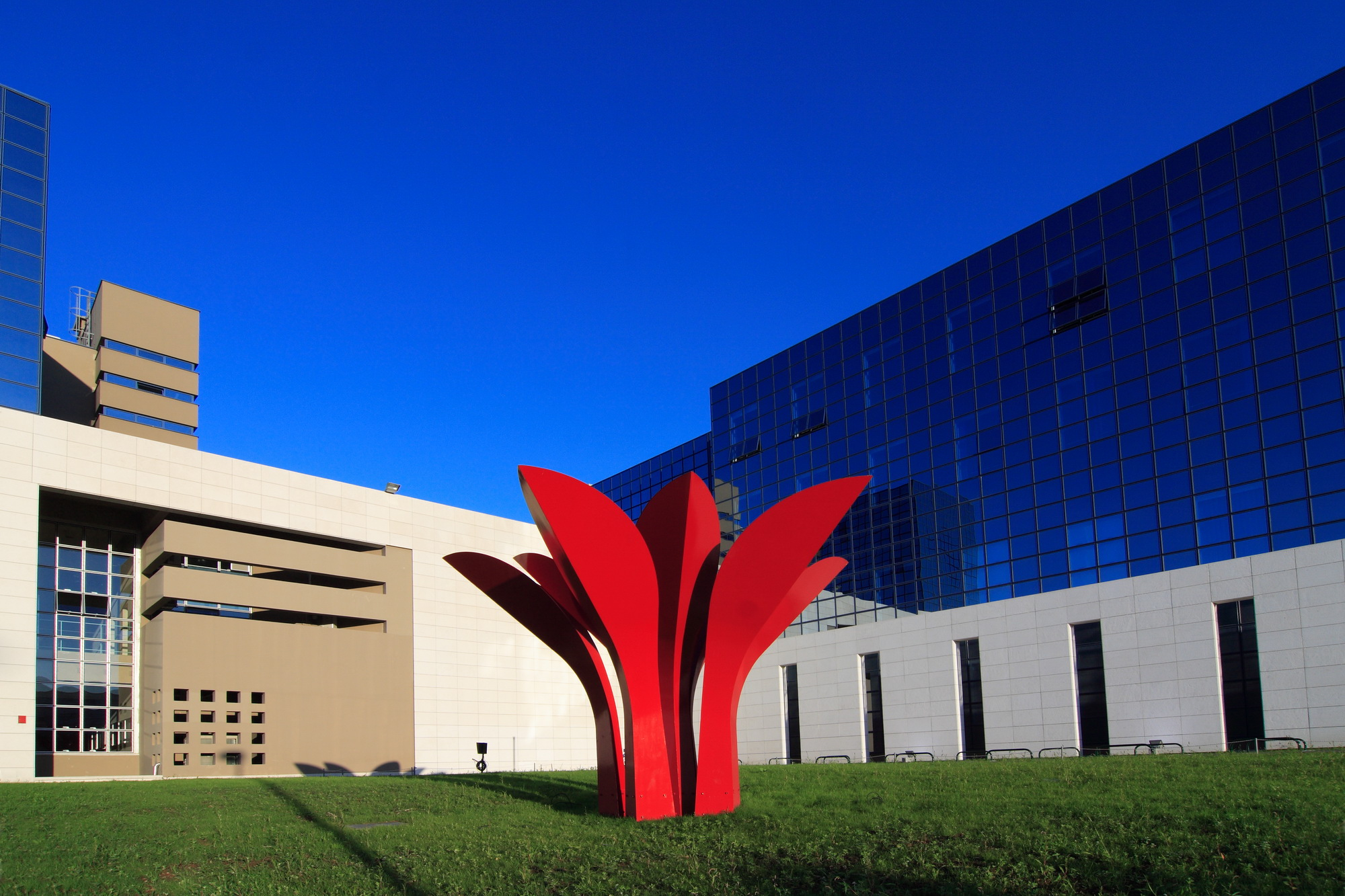
Red Flower (2006), Split, Croatia

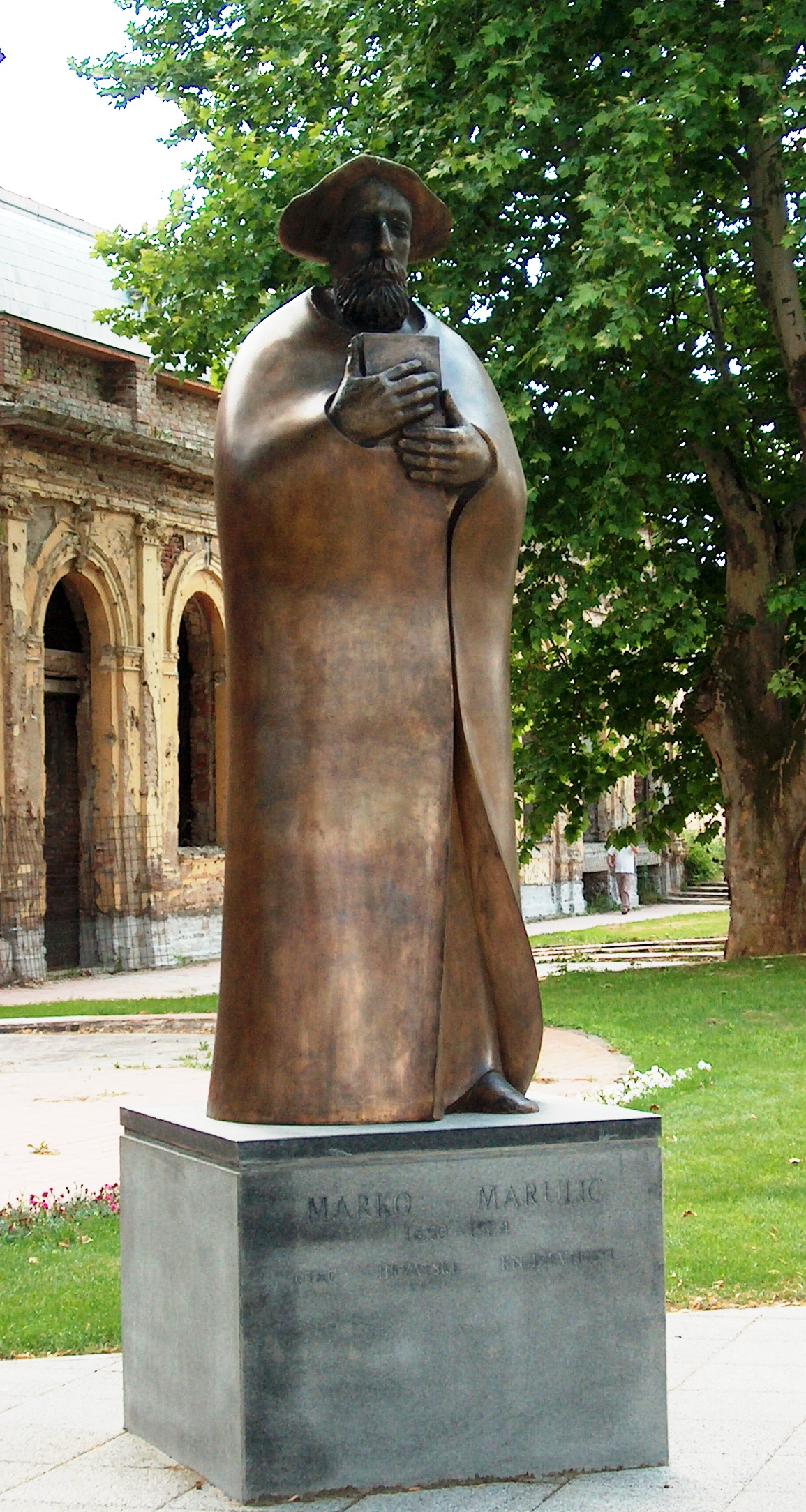
Marko Marulić (2006), Vukovar, Croatia

== In theatre ==
Since the mid-eighties Lipovac has made several highly successful excursions into performing arts and won prestigious Marul award in 1991 for set design. His works in theatre include set, costume and puppet designs:

- Homer, L. Paljetak, The Travels of Ulysses, 1984–85, Puppet theater Pionir, Split - puppet and set design
- C. Debussy, Toybox, M. Ravel, Daphnis et Chloé, 1985–86, Croatian National Theatre in Split - set and costume design
- M. Vetranović, Kako bratja prodaše Jozefa (How the brothers sold Joseph), 1990, Dubrovnik Summer Festival - set design
- Muka Spasitelja našega (The Passion of our Saviour), 1991, Marulovi dani (Marulo days) - set design
- Michel de Ghelderode, Ukleti pjevač (Sire Halewyn), 1991, Split Summer Festival - set design
- Nino Škrabe, Plavi Božić (Blue Christmas), 1992, Licem u lice - set design
- Mate Matišić, Cinco i Marinko, 1993, Croatian National Theatre in Split - set design
- Lada Martinac and Snježana Sinovčić, Živim, 1993, Croatian National Theatre in Split - set design
- I. Tijardović, Mala Floramye (Little Floramye), 2001, Croatian National Theatre in Split - set design
- M. de Cervantes Saavedra, Don Quixote, 2001, Gradsko kazalište mladih Split - set design

== In art and pop culture ==
References in popular culture on Vasko Lipovac and his work:

- Brod u boci (1971) - poetry book by Arsen Dedić was inspired by Lipovac's painting of sailor holding a ship in a bottle.
- Kuća na pijesku (1985) - feature film directed by Ivan Martinac was mostly filmed at Lipovac's home in Split.
- Plava murva, beach Girna Pošta on island Hvar (1990) - sculpture made by Ivo Milatić and Milivoj Čubre as an homage to Lipovac. It is made out of the blue painted mulberry driftwood found on the beach, and ritually repainted every year ever since.
- Tako lijepa (2004) - song from the album "Male Stvari" by hip-hop group Elemental.
- Tipkovnice u Zrak (2004) - song by rap group Dječaci (hr).
- Splitski akvarel(hr) (2009) - award winning experimental short film by Boris Poljak(hr) was inspired by Lipovac's paintings.
- Just Between Us (2010) - Big Golden Arena winning feature film. Screenwriter Ante Tomić based character of famous painter Matko, played by Vanja Drach, on Lipovac.
- Astrolab za Vaska Lipovca (2011) - poem by Jakša Fiamengo
- Tour de Split (2012) - series of art interventions by Ivan Plazibat marking the spots of Lipovac's lost, destroyed and unrealized public art projects in Split.
- Nove boje Splita (2014) - art historian Tanja Štignjedec Sulić, expanding on Lipovac's 1970s work in the public art field, proposed community-based urban regeneration project using colorful interventions inspired by artists characteristic palette.
- Throughout 2014 Petar Grimani performed and filmed number of pieces honoring Lipovac's work including performance in Diocletian's Palace in Split and performance on Piazza del Duomo in Milan using Lipovac’s dove sculpture and video of Verige Strait (Bay of Kotor) inspired by Lipovac's famous painting Verige (currently on display in Presidential Palace in Zagreb).
- An Archive of Stones, to be periodically activated, speculated upon, damaged and finally gilded with fiction (2015) - project by writer and curator Chris Sharp exploring the use of stones in contemporary art. Among the works appearing in the archive is Lipovac's environmental artwork Pearls on the rock of St. Andrew, located in Rabac.
- Venem bez..., Split (2017) - graffiti made by unknown author in protest against the removal of the Blue Tree, iron sculpture erected in memory of Vasko Lipovac.
- Cyclists (2018) - animated short by Veljko Popović, awarded at Annecy and Hiroshima, was designed to pay homage to Lipovac.
- Tereza37 (2020) - Big Golden Arena winning feature film. At the initiative of Lana Barić, one of the modular sculptures used during Lipovac's famous 1974. intervention in Braće Borozan Street, was recreated for the film set.
- Nulti krajolik (2020) - award winning hybrid film (mixing documentary, fiction and experimental film with video art and performance) directed by Bruno Pavić.
- Priča o Plavom stablu (2021) - picture book by Anita Kojundžić Smolčić and Hana Lukas Midžić

== Awards ==
Lipovac was honored with numerous awards:

- 1968 5th Zadar Blue Salon Purchase Award
- 1968 Cetinje Salon Award
- 1969 Herceg Novi Winter Salon Award
- 1970 NIP Slobodna Dalmacija Annual Award
- 1971 6th Zagreb Salon Sculpture Award
- 1971 3rd Split Salon Sculpture Award
- 1972 Večernji List Purchase Award at the 7th Yugoslav Graphic Arts Exhibition in Zagreb
- 1974 Purchase Award at the 8th Yugoslav Graphic Arts Exhibition in Zagreb
- 1974 Purchase Award at the 1st Biennale of Contemporary Croatian Graphic Arts in Split
- 1975 Honorary Mention at the 2nd Yugoslav Biennale of Small Sculpture in Murska Sobota
- 1975 7th Split Salon Sculpture Award
- 1977 Grigor Vitez Illustration Award, Zagreb
- 1978 Sculpture Award at the 7th Mediterranean Biennale in Alexandria
- 1979 City of Split Award
- 1981 Purchase Award at the Yugoslav Biennale of Small Sculpture in Murska Sobota
- 1986 Emanuel Vidović Prize at the Split Salon
- 1987 Grand Honorary Mention at the 7th Yugoslav Biennale of Small Sculpture in Murska Sobota
- 1988 Third Triennial of Croatian Sculpture Award
- 1991 Marul Award for set design
- 1993 Purchase Award for the monument to King Petar Krešimir IV in Šibenik
- 1993 MTG Award at the 14th Zagreb Exhibition of Drawings
- 1995 First prize for the monument to Dražen Petrović at Olympic Museum, Lausanne
- 1996 Split Salon Award
- 1997 Award of the Croatian Watercolor Festival in Zagreb
- 1998 2nd prize for the monument to Marko Marulić in Zagreb
- 2003 Split Graphic Arts Biennale Award
- 2004 Grand Prix of the 3rd Croatian Watercolor Triennale in Karlovac
- 2006 Slobodna Dalmacija Lifetime Achievement Award in Split
