= Friends from College =

2017 American comedy television series

- Genre: Comedy
- Created by: Francesca Delbanco; Nicholas Stoller
- Starring: Keegan-Michael Key; Fred Savage; Annie Parisse; Nat Faxon; Jae Suh Park; Cobie Smulders
- Composer: Michael Andrews
- Country of origin: United States
- Original language: English
- No. of seasons: 2
- No. of episodes: 16

Production
- Executive producers: Francesca Delbanco; Nicholas Stoller
- Cinematography: John Guleserian
- Editors: Shawn Paper; Jonathan Schwartz; Hugh Ross; Michael A. Webber
- Running time: 26–34 minutes
- Production company: Stoller Global Solutions

Original release
- Network: Netflix
- Release: July 14, 2017 – January 11, 2019

Friends from College is an American comedy television series created by Francesca Delbanco and Nicholas Stoller. The series was greenlit for Netflix as an original on March 11, 2016. The first season consists of eight half-hour episodes, and premiered on Netflix on July 14, 2017. On August 21, 2017, Netflix renewed the series for a second season of eight episodes, which was released on January 11, 2019. The series was canceled on February 18, 2019.

== Plot ==
The series irreverently depicts the tragicomic misadventures of a close-knit group of Harvard alumni in their 40s as they navigate their ambitious yet clumsy and romantically intertwined lives in New York City.

== Cast and characters ==
=== Main ===
- Keegan-Michael Key as Ethan Turner, Lisa's husband, a respected but financially struggling writer
- Cobie Smulders as Lisa Turner aka "Froshy", a hedge fund lawyer
- Annie Parisse as Samantha "Sam" Delmonico, a Manhattan interior designer with whom Ethan has been having an on-and-off affair since college
- Nat Faxon as Nick Ames, an unemployed, aging party boy with a trust fund
- Fred Savage as Max Adler, a gay literary agent
- Jae Suh Park as Marianne, a hippie yoga instructor and an unemployed actress

=== Recurring ===
- Billy Eichner as Dr. Felix Forzenheim, Max's fiancé
- Greg Germann as Jon Spurling, Sam's wealthy husband
- Sarah Chalke as Merrill Morgan (season 2), a former Harvard classmate who begins dating Nick
- Zack Robidas as Charlie (season 2), Lisa's new boyfriend

=== Guest ===
- Ike Barinholtz as Degrasso, an obnoxious coworker at Lisa's hedge fund
- Billy Magnussen as Sean, Shawna's attractive kept man
- Kate McKinnon as Shawna, an eccentric YA author
- Seth Rogen as Paul "Party Dog" Dobkin, college classmate of the group, Sam's ex-boyfriend and Ethan's rival/frenemy during their college days
- Chris Elliott as the Mentalist

== Episodes ==
Season	Episodes	Originally released
1	8	July 14, 2017
2	8	January 11, 2019

=== Season 1 (2017) ===
No. overall	No. in season	Title	Directed by	Written by	Original release date
1	1	"Welcome to New York"	Nicholas Stoller	Francesca Delbanco and Nicholas Stoller	July 14, 2017
2	2	"Connecticut House"	Nicholas Stoller	Ron Weiner	July 14, 2017
3	3	"All-Nighter"	Nicholas Stoller	Andrew Gurland	July 14, 2017
4	4	"Mission Impossible"	Nicholas Stoller	Francesca Delbanco and Nicholas Stoller	July 14, 2017
5	5	"Party Bus"	Nicholas Stoller	Justin Nowell	July 14, 2017
6	6	"Second Wedding"	Nicholas Stoller	Colleen McGuinness	July 14, 2017
7	7	"Grand Cayman"	Nicholas Stoller	Ron Weiner	July 14, 2017
8	8	"A Night of Surprises"	Nicholas Stoller	Francesca Delbanco and Nicholas Stoller	July 14, 2017

=== Season 2 (2019) ===
No. overall	No. in season	Title	Directed by	Written by	Original release date
9	1	"The Engagement Party"	Nicholas Stoller	Francesca Delbanco and Nicholas Stoller	January 11, 2019
10	2	"Storage Unit"	Nicholas Stoller	Andrew Gurland	January 11, 2019
11	3	"Out All Night"	Nicholas Stoller	Guy Endore-Kaiser	January 11, 2019
12	4	"The Bachelor Party"	Andrew Gurland	Justin Nowell	January 11, 2019
13	5	"Old Habits"	Andrew Gurland	Ian Edwards	January 11, 2019
14	6	"Free Fall"	Nicholas Stoller	Alexandra Rushfield	January 11, 2019
15	7	"Fireworks"	Francesca Delbanco	Francesca Delbanco and Nicholas Stoller	January 11, 2019
16	8	"The Wedding"	Nicholas Stoller	Francesca Delbanco and Nicholas Stoller	January 11, 2019

== Reception ==
On Rotten Tomatoes, the series has an approval rating of 24% based on 62 reviews, with an average rating of 4.78/10. The site's critical consensus reads, "Even a cast of talented comedic actors can't keep Friends from College from being anything but underwhelming." On Metacritic, the series has a score of 44 out of 100, based on 31 critics, indicating "mixed or average reviews".

Jeff Jensen of Entertainment Weekly gave the first season a C− rating, writing that the series wastes the talents of its cast members. Tim Dowling of The Guardian writes, "Each character may be unpleasant in his or her own right, but the sheer charmlessness of the group is hard to overstate. If they were sitting at a table near you, you'd leave the restaurant."
