= Platonic (TV series) =

2023 American comedy television series

- Genre: Comedy
- Created by: Francesca Delbanco & Nicholas Stoller
- Showrunners: Francesca Delbanco; Nicholas Stoller
- Starring: Rose Byrne; Seth Rogen; Luke Macfarlane; Carla Gallo; Tre Hale; Andrew Lopez
- Music by: Michael Andrews
- Country of origin: United States
- Original language: English
- No. of seasons: 2
- No. of episodes: 20

Production
- Executive producers: Conor Welch; Rose Byrne; Seth Rogen; Francesca Delbanco; Nicholas Stoller; Evan Goldberg; James Weaver
- Producers: O'Shea Read; Werner Walian
- Cinematography: John Guleserian
- Editors: Hugh Ross; Shawn Paper; Libby Cuenin
- Running time: 23–39 minutes
- Production companies: Point Grey Pictures; Stoller Global Solutions; Sony Pictures Television

Original release
- Network: Apple TV+
- Release: May 24, 2023 – October 1, 2025
- Network: Apple TV

Platonic is an American comedy television series created by Francesca Delbanco and Nicholas Stoller that premiered on Apple TV+ on May 24, 2023. This series stars Rose Byrne, Seth Rogen, Luke Macfarlane, and Carla Gallo. In December 2023, the series was renewed for a second season, which premiered on August 6, 2025. In December 2025, the series was renewed for a third season.

== Cast and characters ==
=== Main ===
- Rose Byrne as Sylvia, a stay-at-home mom of 3 and wife who reconnects with her former best friend, Will
- Luke Macfarlane as Charlie, Sylvia's husband who is a lawyer
- Seth Rogen as Will, Sylvia's former best friend who's recently divorced
- Carla Gallo as Katie, Sylvia's best friend who is also a mother
- Tre Hale as Andy (season 1; recurring season 2), Will's friend and business partner
- Andrew Lopez as Reggie (season 1; recurring season 2), the main investor of Will's brewery and the stepbrother of his ex-wife, Audrey

=== Recurring ===
- Alisha Wainwright as Audrey, Will's ex-wife
- Vinny Thomas as Omar, a colleague of Will's
- Francesca Delbanco as Diane
- Guy Branum as Stewart, a colleague of Charlie's
- Janet Varney as Vanessa, a colleague of Charlie's
- Emily Kimball as Peyton, Will's 26-year-old rebound girl
- Rachel Rosenbloom as Jenna, Will's new fiancée
- Sophie Leonard as Frances (season 2; co-starring season 1), Sylvia and Charlie's eldest daughter who is a teenager
- Max Matenko as Simon (season 2; co-starring season 1), Sylvia and Charlie's only son who is their middle child
- Sophia Kopera as Maeve (season 2; co-starring season 1), Sylvia and Charlie's younger daughter who is their youngest child
- Beck Bennett as Wild Card (season 2), Sylvia and Will's old friend who is in town for Will's bachelor party
- Kyle Mooney as Terry (season 2)
- Aidy Bryant as Carrie (season 2)

=== Special guest star ===
- Bobby Cannavale as Brett Coyote (season 2)

== Episodes ==
=== Series overview ===
Season	Episodes	Originally released	
Season	Episodes	First released	Last released
1	10	May 24, 2023	July 12, 2023
2	10	August 6, 2025	October 1, 2025

=== Season 1 (2023) ===
No. overall	No. in season	Title	Directed by	Written by	Original release date
1	1	"Pilot"	Nicholas Stoller	Francesca Delbanco & Nicholas Stoller	May 24, 2023
While looking on social media, Sylvia sees that her old friend Will is getting a divorce. They were previously close, but had not spoken after Sylvia told Will that she did not like his wife, Audrey. Will and Sylvia meet for coffee, and Sylvia pretends to not know about his divorce. Will invites her to attend a party at his bar, which she attends with her friend Katie. Will confronts Audrey, who has shown up at his bar, and Sylvia takes him to grab another drink. They reminisce about their former friendship, but Will becomes angry when he realizes that Sylvia knew about his divorce. They angrily leave, but end up texting each other when they get home and make plans to meet again.
2	2	"Gandalf the Lizard"	Nicholas Stoller	Ron Weiner	May 24, 2023
Sylvia and Charlie discuss moving to a new house, and Sylvia books an appointment to see a house with her realtor. Will calls to say she left her credit card at his bar, and he brings it to her house. After he helps her fix her toilet, she asks him to come to the house showing. He arrives, pretending to be a contractor, but tells Sylvia that she should not buy the house, which is a former senior assisted-living facility. Sylvia convinces Will to drive to Audrey's house to retrieve some of his stuff. She crawls in through the dog door, but they are confronted by Audrey. They leave, but Sylvia steals Will's pet bearded dragon, Gandalf. Sylvia agrees to take care of Gandalf and brings him to her children as a new pet, despite Charlie's protests, but she does not tell them he belonged to Will and the children name him "Jessipa."
3	3	"Partner's Retreat"	Nicholas Stoller	Guy Endore-Kaiser	May 24, 2023
Sylvia and Charlie go to a work event in Charlie's firm, where he was recently made a partner. Sylvia, having traded her law career to spend time with her children, feels inadequate. Sylvia meets with Will, who encourages her to assert herself. They get drunk at a cheesy, Johnny Rockets-like chain restaurant which Sylvia loves, and she suggests Will market Lucky Penny's beer to the chain. When Charlie's boss reintroduces himself to her, Sylvia threatens to eat his speech if he can't remember her name, which she does when he cannot. Charlie is embarrassed, but Sylvia and Will laugh about the incident.
4	4	"Divorce Party"	Francesca Delbanco	Brittany Miller	May 31, 2023
After attending a party for her divorced friend, Sylvia throws a similar party for Will. They get very drunk, and Will convinces her to do cocaine with his friends. However, the coke is laced with ketamine, causing Sylvia to panic. They end up at Will's apartment. Sylvia returns home to an unhappy Charlie, and Will texts a girl that he previously hooked up with.
5	5	"My Wife's Boyfriend"	Francesca Delbanco	Andrew Gurland	June 7, 2023
Will continues to see Peyton, and they make things official. Charlie and his work friends begin referring to Will as his "wife's boyfriend." Charlie attempts to bond further with Will by taking him to a Dodgers game. They get drunk and have a great time, and Will tells Charlie about his relationship with Peyton. They later go back to Lucky Penny, and invite Sylvia along. Everyone has a fun time until it slips that Will has a girlfriend and Sylvia grills him for not telling her about his relationship. As the argument escalates, Will gets a piece of glass in his hand and must go to the ER. Later, at their respective homes, Will affirms his affection for Peyton and Charlie confesses to Sylvia that he is jealous of the time she spends with Will.
6	6	"The Big Two Six"	Francesca Delbanco	Justin Nowell	June 14, 2023
Sylvia gets a job at Kurt Friedken's law firm. She also meets Peyton, and Will presses Sylvia about what she thinks about her. However, when Sylvia learns that Peyton is a babysitter, she hires Peyton to babysit her children while she's at her new job. Sylvia accidentally sends mixed signals to Peyton about Will's intentions, and Peyton overreacts. Later, Will decides to throw Peyton her twenty-sixth birthday party at Lucky Penny, but suddenly feels awkward dating her after watching her do a group dance with her friends. He breaks up with her when they go back to her home.
7	7	"Let the River Run"	Nicholas Stoller	Francesca Delbanco	June 21, 2023
Sylvia begins her job at the law firm. Charlie's colleagues express doubt that Sylvia, who is in her early forties, can keep up with the demands of associate-level law work. Indeed, she finds herself struggling with the workflow and quickly alienates her young colleagues with various social faux-pas. While working late, she falls asleep, accidentally damaging a portrait of Kurt. Will uses his ex-wife Audrey's connections with an eccentric artist to repair the painting. While waiting for the painting, Will and Sylvia go to Lucky Penny. There, Will learns that his partners at Lucky Penny have created a hard kombucha called "Da Booch" without him, and that Peyton now works at Lucky Penny and that Andy has been dating Sylvia's friend Katie. They retrieve the painting, upon which the painter has drawn a penis. Sylvia attempts to feign ignorance the next day, but security footage reveals her part in the incident and she is fired.
8	8	"San Diego"	Nicholas Stoller	Francesca Delbanco	June 28, 2023
Sylvia avoids telling Charlie she was fired, hanging out at Lucky Penny with Will instead. She finally tells him, whose support doesn't make her feel better. She goes on a trip to San Diego with Will, Katie, and the Lucky Penny team to meet with Johnny Rev, the owner of the establishment who is offering to carry Lucky Penny's beer. The partners are hesitant to let Will talk, but he impresses Johnny Rev with his business acumen. However, Johnny Rev tries to kiss Sylvia. When she rebuffs him, he scolds and humiliates her. His behavior becomes increasingly belligerent until Will stands up for Sylvia, getting the group kicked out of the house and squashing the deal. Andy proposes to Katie. Back at his office, Charlie discovers through their shared photo app where Sylvia has been after being fired and Vanessa discovers through social media Gandalf the lizard originally belonged to Will, which Sylvia had hidden from her family.
9	9	"Slumber Party"	Nicholas Stoller	Francesca Delbanco	July 4, 2023
While working late, Charlie gets drunk with Vanessa, another partner. They begin dancing and eventually dry-hump before awkwardly parting. Charlie confesses the incident to Sylvia, who is hurt. Sylvia has Will over and the two get high, play video games and watch YouTube videos all night. He suggests Sylvia renovate their aging garage. Will tries to talk to his partners about cutting him into the "Da Booch" business. He comes over to help survey the garage but quickly discovers that it's damaged. A panic ensues involving a raccoon, and the garage partially collapses. Upon leaving, Will angrily tells Sylvia to deal with her issues with Charlie. Charlie confesses his own jealousy to Sylvia, at not being the most important man in her life, and promises the incident with Vanessa had nothing to do with her. They agree to move forward. At the bar, Will is confronted by his business partners and a lawyer, who want him to sell his share of the business and leave. Will vows to not leave.
10	10	"When Will Met Sylvia"	Nicholas Stoller	Francesca Delbanco	July 12, 2023
Sylvia and Charlie, having reconciled, purchase a new home. They throw a housewarming party, which Will attends. He and Sylvia think they see a UFO, but Will causes a scene and he and Sylvia argue. Andy and Katie ask Sylvia to plan their wedding. She is contacted by someone investigating accusations against Johnny Rev for inappropriate behaviour. Sylvia informs Will that Johnny Rev has been ousted and his VP Jenna, who had taken a liking to Will, is now CEO of the company. She convinces him to go to San Diego and talk about a potential job. Will is offered the job and reluctantly realizes he will have to move to San Diego. A year later, Sylvia is a successful event planner and has planned a beautiful wedding for Katie and Andy. Will arrives with Jenna, and he reveals that they are now engaged. He and Sylvia reminisce about the importance of their friendship and how it helped them through a difficult time.

=== Season 2 (2025) ===
No. overall	No. in season	Title	Directed by	Written by	Original release date
11	1	"The Engagement Party"	Nicholas Stoller	Francesca Delbanco & Nicholas Stoller	August 6, 2025
Sylvia and her family drive down to San Diego for Will's engagement party. Soon after she arrives, Jenna asks Sylvia to convince Will to participate in a song for their party. Will admits to Sylvia that he has developed a crush on another woman, which Sylvia attempts to convince Will is just him getting nervous before the engagement party. During the party, Will and Sylvia leave to get more champagne, but Will makes an additional stop at a sandwich shop, and Sylvia learns that he is attracted to the cashier. They return to the party, and Will participates in the family song. Jenna confronts Will and Sylvia, and is suspicious as to why they were gone for most of the party.
12	2	"The Dinner Party"	Nicholas Stoller	Ron Weiner	August 6, 2025
13	3	"The Bachelor Party"	Francesca Delbanco	Justin Nowell	August 13, 2025
14	4	"Fore!"	Francesca Delbanco	Andrew Gurland	August 20, 2025
15	5	"Jeopardy"	Nicholas Stoller	Ali Rushfield	August 27, 2025
16	6	"Road Trip"	Francesca Delbanco	Judy Choi	September 3, 2025
17	7	"The Office Party"	Francesca Delbanco	Francesca Delbanco	September 10, 2025
18	8	"Young Darcy Mysteries"	Francesca Delbanco	Francesca Delbanco	September 17, 2025
19	9	"Boundaries"	Nicholas Stoller	Francesca Delbanco	September 24, 2025
20	10	"Brett Coyote's Last Stand"	Nicholas Stoller	Francesca Delbanco	October 1, 2025

== Production ==
Promotional poster

=== Development ===
On October 15, 2020, Apple TV+ gave the production a series order consisting of 10 half-hour long episodes. The series is created and showran by Nicholas Stoller and Francesca Delbanco who also serve as executive producers alongside Rose Byrne, Seth Rogen, and Conor Welch. Stoller also directed the series. Stoller Global Solutions and Sony Pictures Television are producing the series. On December 14, 2023, Apple TV+ renewed the series for a second season. On December 5, 2025, Apple TV renewed the series for a third season.

=== Casting ===
Upon series order announcement, Rose Byrne cast in undisclosed starring role. On May 5, 2022, Luke Macfarlane, Seth Rogen, Tre Hale, Carla Gallo, and Andrew Lopez joined the main cast. On June 29, 2022, Alisha Wainwright, Guy Branum, Janet Varney, Emily Kimball, and Vinny Thomas were cast in recurring roles. On September 18, 2024, Aidy Bryant, Kyle Mooney, and Beck Bennett joined the cast in recurring capacities for the second season.

=== Filming ===
Filming of the first season began by May 2022, with production taking place in Los Angeles.

== Release ==
Platonic was released on Apple TV+ on May 24, 2023, with the first three episodes available immediately and the rest releasing on a weekly basis until July 12. The second season premiered on August 6, 2025, with the first two episodes, followed by the rest of the episodes premiering weekly until October 1.

== Reception ==
=== Season 1 ===
On Rotten Tomatoes, the first season holds an approval rating of 93% based on 58 critic reviews. The website's critics consensus reads, "Even with bold swings and romance off the table, the rambunctious rapport between Rose Byrne and Seth Rogen makes Platonic an ideal relationship comedy." On Metacritic, it has a weighted average score of 75 out of 100 based on 26 critics, indicating "generally favorable".

Richard Roeper of Chicago Sun-Times gave the first season 3.5 out of 4 stars and described as "clever, funny, insightful and immediately addictive..." Cindy White of The A.V. Club gave the season a B+ and said, "Platonic doesn't break any molds, but it's nice to see another example of a breezy comedy that's not afraid to let its characters be human and even unlikable at times.

=== Season 2 ===
The second season has a 100% approval rating on Rotten Tomatoes based on 27 critic reviews. The website's critics consensus states, "Platonic is easy to love in a sophomore season that continues to expertly leverage Rose Byrne and Seth Rogen's explosively charming chemistry." Metacritic, which uses a weighted average, assigned a score of 81 out of 100 based on 12 critics, indicating "universal acclaim".
