= Christophe Beck =

Canadian composer (born 1968)

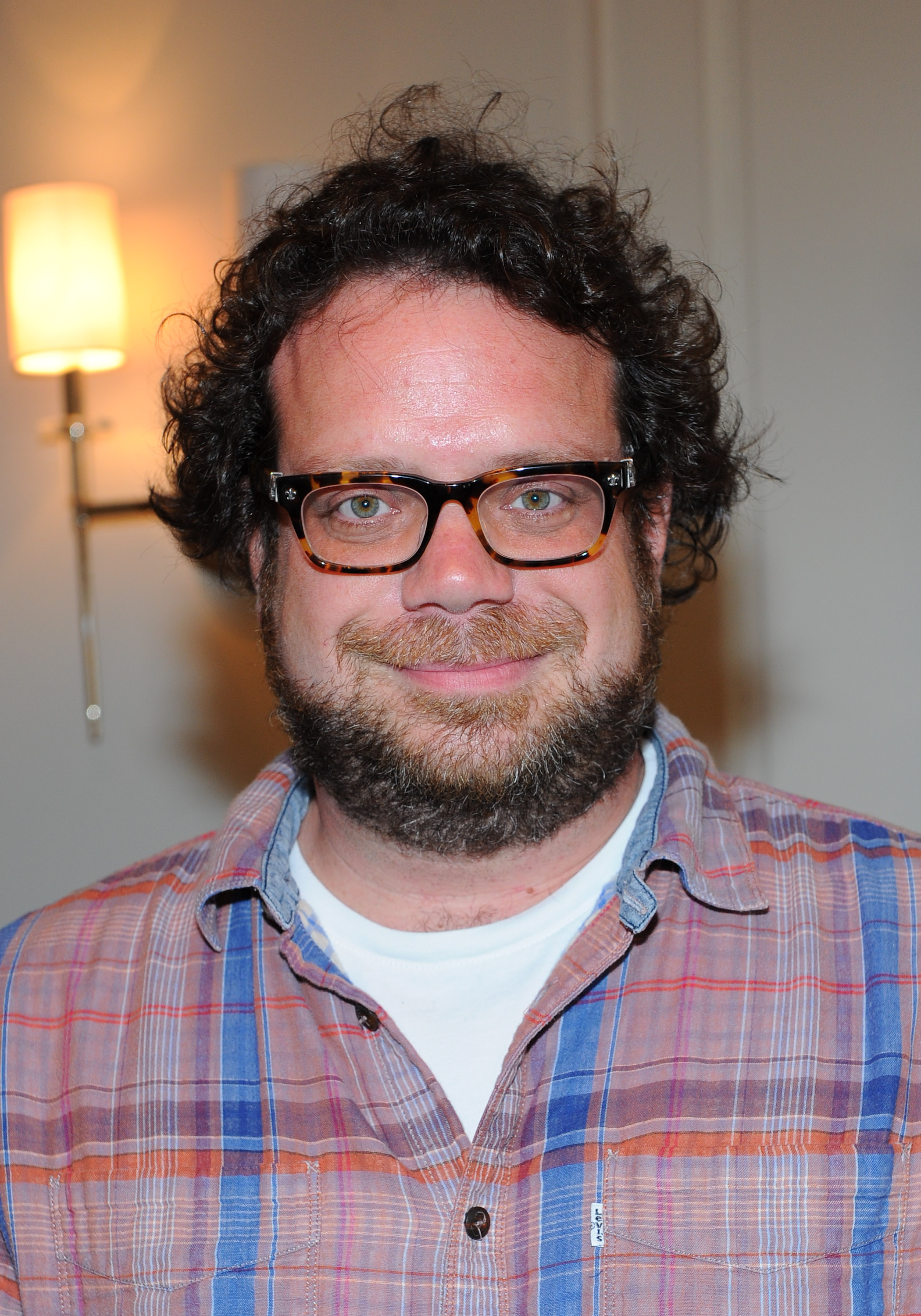
- Beck in 2012
- Born: Jean-Christophe Beck; 1968 (age 57–58); Montreal, Quebec, Canada
- Education: Crescent School
- Alma mater: Yale University
- Relatives: Chilly Gonzales (brother)
- Musical career
- Genres: Film score
- Occupations: Composer; conductor; arranger
- Instruments: Piano; keyboards; drums; saxophone

Jean-Christophe Beck (born 1968) is a Canadian composer of film and television scores. He is best known for his collaborations with Disney and its subsidiaries, which include composing the soundtracks of The Muppets (2011) and Muppets Most Wanted (2014), Frozen (2013) and Frozen 2 (2019), the Marvel Cinematic Universe works Ant-Man (2015), Ant-Man and the Wasp (2018), Ant-Man and the Wasp: Quantumania (2023), WandaVision (2021), Hawkeye (2021), and Agatha All Along (2024).

He composed the scores for several of Shawn Levy's films, including Big Fat Liar (2002), Just Married (2003), Cheaper by the Dozen (2003), The Pink Panther (2006), The Internship (2013), and Free Guy (2021). He is also known for composing the scores of the The Hangover (2009-13) film series, the television series Buffy the Vampire Slayer and its spinoff Angel, and the Disney's 100th anniversary logo.

Beck won a Primetime Emmy Award for Outstanding Music Composition for a Series (Original Dramatic Score) for his work on Buffy the Vampire Slayer, and was nominated for Outstanding Music Composition for a Limited Series or Movie for WandaVision. He is also a Grammy Award and a two-time Gemini Award nominee.

== Early life ==
Beck was born and raised in Montreal, Quebec. His younger brother, Jason (b. 1972) is a composer, pianist, and rapper under the stage name Chilly Gonzales.

Beck started piano lessons at the age of five, and by the time he turned eleven, he was learning Bee Gees songs by ear and performing with his first band, Newton Talks, who licensed a song to Hot Tub Time Machine. He attended Crescent School where he studied piano, saxophone, and drums. He wrote two musicals while studying music at Yale University.

== Career ==
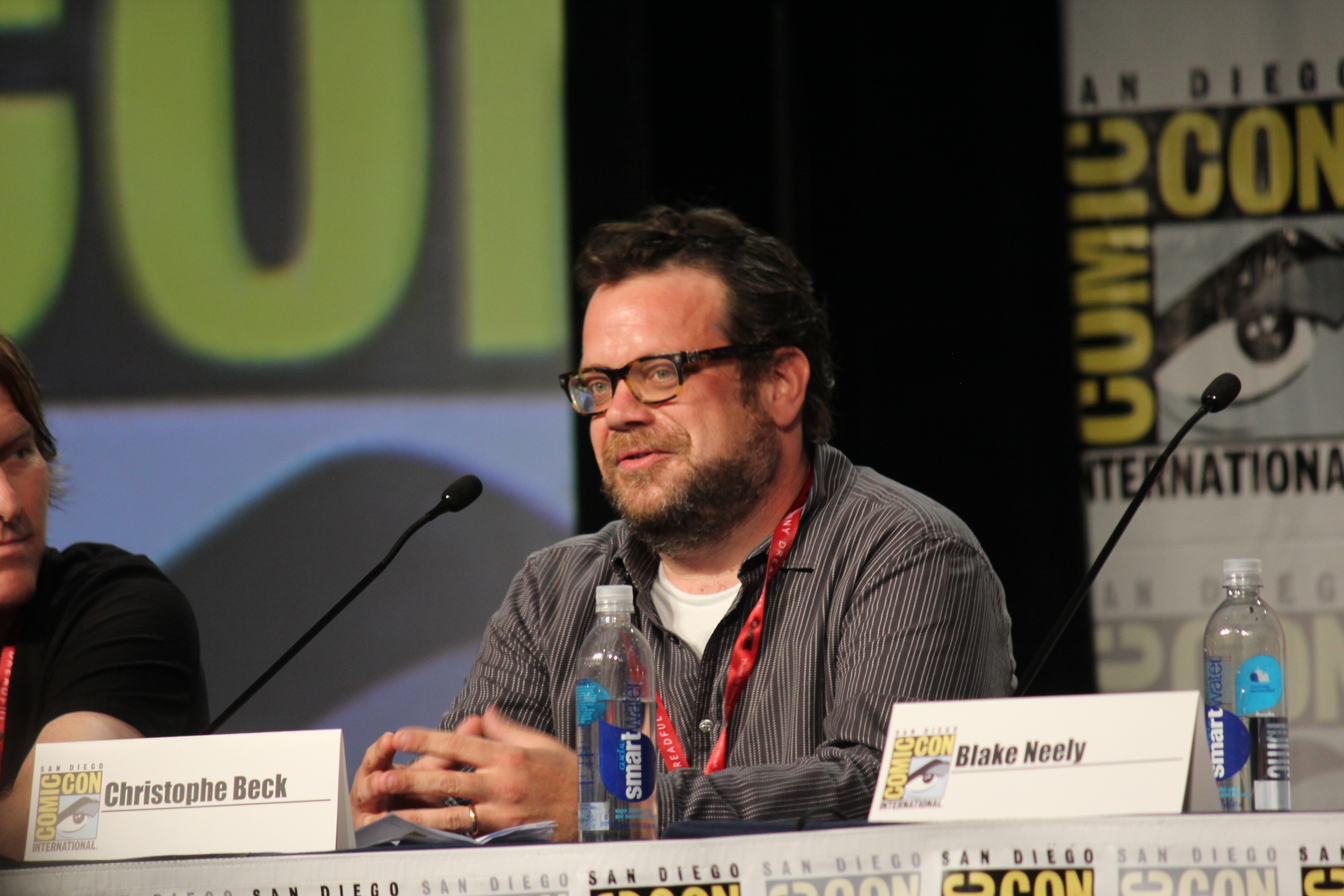
Beck at San Diego Comic-Con in 2014

Upon graduation, Beck moved to Los Angeles to attend USC's film scoring program, where he studied with Jerry Goldsmith. A personal recommendation from Buddy Baker, then head of the USC Music Department, led to his first assignment for a Canadian TV series called White Fang. Several TV series later, he was asked to score the second season of the WB Network show Buffy the Vampire Slayer. Beck received an Emmy Award for Outstanding Music Composition for his score to the Buffy episode "Becoming, Part 1".

In 2000, the cheerleading comedy Bring It On launched Beck's film career. His credits include Under the Tuscan Sun, Edge of Tomorrow, Crazy, Stupid, Love, Pitch Perfect, and the Hangover trilogy. More recently, Beck scored the Oscar- and Grammy-winning animated film Frozen, and several installments in the Marvel Cinematic Universe (MCU). At the D23 Expo in 2022, it was announced that Beck had composed a new arrangement of "When You Wish Upon a Star" to accompany Disney's 100th anniversary logo, conducted by Tim Davies, which debuted ahead of the film Strange World.

Beck works out of his studio in Santa Monica, California.

== Filmography ==
=== Composer ===
==== Film ====
| Year | Title | Notes |
|---|---|---|
| 1996 | Crossworlds | |
| 1996 | Past Perfect | |
| 1996 | Mr. October | Short film |
| 1997 | Hostile Intent | |
| 1997 | The Alarmist | |
| 1998 | Starstruck | |
| 1998 | Bone Daddy | |
| 1998 | Airborne | |
| 1998 | Dog Park | |
| 1999 | Thick as Thieves | |
| 1999 | Let the Devil Wear Black | |
| 1999 | Guinevere | |
| 1999 | Coming Soon | |
| 2000 | The Broken Hearts Club | |
| 2000 | Bring It On | |
| 2000 | Big Time | Short film |
| 2001 | Lightmaker | |
| 2001 | The Cutting Room | Short film |
| 2002 | Big Fat Liar | |
| 2002 | The Skulls II | |
| 2002 | Interstate 60 | |
| 2002 | Stealing Harvard | |
| 2002 | The Tuxedo | |
| 2003 | Just Married | |
| 2003 | The Event | |
| 2003 | Confidence | |
| 2003 | American Wedding | |
| 2003 | Dickie Roberts: Former Child Star | |
| 2003 | Under the Tuscan Sun | |
| 2003 | Cheaper by the Dozen | |
| 2004 | Saved! | |
| 2004 | The Skulls III | |
| 2004 | Garfield | |
| 2004 | A Cinderella Story | |
| 2004 | Little Black Book | |
| 2004 | Without a Paddle | |
| 2004 | Taxi | |
| 2005 | Elektra | |
| 2005 | Ice Princess | |
| 2005 | The Perfect Man | |
| 2005 | 3 Needles | |
| 2005 | Two for the Money | |
| 2005 | Yours, Mine & Ours | |
| 2006 | The Pink Panther | |
| 2006 | The Sentinel | |
| 2006 | Garfield: A Tail of Two Kitties | |
| 2006 | Zoom | |
| 2006 | School for Scoundrels | |
| 2006 | We Are Marshall | |
| 2007 | Year of the Dog | |
| 2007 | Charlie Bartlett | |
| 2007 | License to Wed | |
| 2007 | The Seeker: The Dark Is Rising | |
| 2007 | Fred Claus | |
| 2008 | Phoebe in Wonderland | |
| 2008 | Drillbit Taylor | |
| 2008 | What Happens in Vegas | |
| 2009 | The Greatest | |
| 2009 | The Pink Panther 2 | |
| 2009 | The Hangover | |
| 2009 | I Love You, Beth Cooper | |
| 2009 | Post Grad | |
| 2009 | The Marc Pease Experience | |
| 2009 | All About Steve | |
| 2010 | Waiting for 'Superman' | Documentary |
| 2010 | Percy Jackson & the Olympians: The Lightning Thief | |
| 2010 | Hot Tub Time Machine | |
| 2010 | Date Night | |
| 2010 | Death at a Funeral | |
| 2010 | RED | |
| 2010 | Due Date | |
| 2010 | Burlesque | |
| 2011 | Cedar Rapids | |
| 2011 | The Hangover Part II | |
| 2011 | Crazy, Stupid, Love. | |
| 2011 | Tower Heist | |
| 2011 | The Muppets | Songs by Bret McKenzie |
| 2012 | This Means War | |
| 2012 | The Road We've Traveled | Documentary short |
| 2012 | The Watch | |
| 2012 | Pitch Perfect | |
| 2012 | Paperman | Short film |
| 2012 | The Guilt Trip | |
| 2013 | Movie 43 | Segment: "Happy Birthday" |
| 2013 | Charlie Countryman | |
| 2013 | The Hangover Part III | |
| 2013 | The Internship | |
| 2013 | R.I.P.D. | |
| 2013 | Runner Runner | |
| 2013 | Frozen | Songs by Kristen Anderson-Lopez and Robert Lopez; First score for a fully animated film |
| 2014 | Endless Love | |
| 2014 | Muppets Most Wanted | Songs by Bret McKenzie |
| 2014 | Red Army | Documentary |
| 2014 | Edge of Tomorrow | |
| 2014 | Let's Be Cops | |
| 2014 | Good Kill | |
| 2014 | Cake | |
| 2014 | Alexander and the Terrible, Horrible, No Good, Very Bad Day | |
| 2015 | Hot Tub Time Machine 2 | |
| 2015 | Frozen Fever | Short film |
| 2015 | Get Hard | |
| 2015 | Hot Pursuit | |
| 2015 | Ant-Man | |
| 2015 | The Peanuts Movie | |
| 2015 | Sisters | |
| 2016 | Trolls | |
| 2016 | June | Short film |
| 2017 | Lou | Short film |
| 2017 | An Ordinary Man | |
| 2017 | A Symphony of Hope | Documentary |
| 2017 | American Made | |
| 2017 | Olaf's Frozen Adventure | Short film |
| 2017 | The 12th Man | |
| 2018 | Gringo | |
| 2018 | Anon | |
| 2018 | Ant-Man and the Wasp | |
| 2018 | The Christmas Chronicles | |
| 2019 | Watson | Documentary |
| 2019 | Frozen 2 | Songs by Kristen Anderson-Lopez and Robert Lopez |
| 2020 | Like a Boss | |
| 2020 | Once Upon a Snowman | Short film |
| 2020 | The Christmas Chronicles 2 | |
| 2021 | Free Guy | |
| 2023 | Ant-Man and the Wasp: Quantumania | |
| 2023 | Shazam! Fury of the Gods | |
| 2023 | Nimona | |
| 2024 | Road House | |
| 2024 | Unfrosted | |
| 2024 | The Instigators | |
| 2026 | The Sheep Detectives | |

==== Television ====
| Year | Title | Notes |
|---|---|---|
| 1993-94 | White Fang | |
| 1995 | Land's End | 2 episodes |
| 1995 | Pig Sty | 1 episode |
| 1996 | The Outer Limits | 1 episode |
| 1996 | Good Company | |
| 1996 | Second Noah | 5 episodes |
| 1996-97 | Two | 14 episodes |
| 1996-98 | F/X: The Series | 39 episodes |
| 1997 | Friends 'Til the End | TV film |
| 1997 | Killing Mr. Griffin | TV film |
| 1997-98 | George & Leo | 7 episodes |
| 1997-98 | Spy Game | 13 episodes |
| 1997-2001 | Buffy the Vampire Slayer | 58 episodes |
| 1998 | Earthquake in New York | TV film |
| 1999 | The Last Witness | TV film |
| 1999-2000 | Angel | 22 episodes |
| 1999-2000 | The Practice | 24 episodes |
| 2001 | Wolf Girl | TV film |
| 2006 | Day Break | 1 episode |
| 2012 | The Cat in the Hat Knows a Lot About That! | 1 episode |
| 2012 | Rogue | TV film |
| 2012 | Little Brother | TV film |
| 2014 | 30 for 30: Soccer Stories | 1 episode |
| 2019 | Frozen 2 - SAKS - Enchanted Forest | Special |
| 2021 | WandaVision | Limited series Original themes by Kristen Anderson-Lopez and Robert Lopez |
| 2021 | Hawkeye | Limited series Composed with Michael Paraskevas |
| 2024 | Agatha All Along | Limited series Composed with Michael Paraskevas; Original songs by Kristen Anderson-Lopez and Robert Lopez |

=== Music department ===
| Year | Work | Contribution | Notes | Reference |
|---|---|---|---|---|
| 1990 | Jetsons: The Movie | (orchestrator) | | |
| 1994 | Death Match | (additional music programmer) (music scoring mixer) | | |
| 1995 | Pig Sty | (composer) (lyrics) | (TV series) | |
| 1995 | Land's End | (composer) | (TV series) | |
| 1997 | The Alarmist | (music producer: score) | | |
| 1998 | F/X: The Series | (composer) | (TV series) | |
| 1999 | Let the Devil Wear Black | (score produced by) | | |
| 1999 | Guinevere | (score producer) | | |
| 2000 | Bring It On | (score producer) | | |
| 2001 | Buffy the Vampire Slayer | (musical director) (song arranger) (song producer) (composer) | (TV series) (Episode: "Once More, with Feeling") | |
| 2002 | Interstate 60: Episodes of the Road | (conductor: score) | | |
| 2002 | HBO First Look | (musician) | (TV Series documentary short) | |
| 2003 | Confidence | (conductor) (score producer) | | |
| 2004 | Saved! | (score produced by) | | |
| 2004 | Without a Paddle | (score producer) | | |
| 2006 | The Pink Panther | (score producer) | | |
| 2006 | School for Scoundrels | (score producer) | | |
| 2007 | Day Break | (composer) | (TV series) | |
| 2007 | Charlie Bartlett | (score producer) | | |
| 2010 | Hot Tub Time Machine | (score producer) | | |
| 2012 | Struck by Lightning | (score produced by) | | |
| 2013 | Frozen | (additional song orchestrator) | | |
| 2018 | BaseBoys | (music) | (TV series) | |
| 2025 | Snow White | (music consultant) | | |

=== Soundtrack ===
| Year | Work | Job | Notes | Reference |
|---|---|---|---|---|
| 1997 | Nightwatch | (performer: "Looking for James") (writer: "Looking for James") | | |
| 1999 | Coming Soon | (performer: "Alive Again") (writer: "Alive Again") | | |
| 2000 | Buffy the Vampire Slayer | (performer) (writer) | (TV series) | |
| 2002 | Slap Her, She's French! | (writer: "The Beef Song") | | |
| 2002 | Big Fat Liar | (writer: "Spanish Backlot") | | |
| 2003 | The Event | (performer: "F**k You Very Much", "Mother", "Final Goodbye") (writer: "F**k You Very Much", "Mother", "Final Goodbye") | | |
| 2003 | Dickie Roberts: Former Child Star | ("Son Sueños") | | |
| 2005 | Wedding Crashers | (writer: "Springtime" (2003)) | | |
| 2006 | Click | (writer: "Home 3") | | |
| 2006 | Employee of the Month | (performer: "All About the Money") (writer: "All About the Money") | | |
| 2007 | Fred Claus | (writer: "Kids Miss the Old Life", "Even the Dog Is Homesick") | | |
| 2008 | Phoebe in Wonderland | (arranger: "Ninety Times Nine") | | |
| 2009 | Dr. Dolittle: Million Dollar Mutts | (performer: "Rave Opera") / (writer: "Rave Opera") | (Video) | |
| 2010 | Hot Tub Time Machine | (writer: "Blind Man") | | |
| 2010 | Knight and Day | (writer: "Dolby's Con") | | |
| 2012 | Think Like a Man | (writer: "Jack and Ali") | | |
| 2012 | Atop the Fourth Wall | ("Close Your Eyes") | (TV series) | |
| 2013 | Frozen | [producer: "Vuelie", "Heimr Àrnadalr" (uncredited), "Vuelie (Reprise)"] [writer: "Vuelie", "Heimr Àrnadalr" (uncredited), "Vuelie (Reprise)"] | | |
| 2014 | The Amazing Spider-Man 2 | (writer: "Blind Man") | (uncredited) | |
| 2014 | The Judge | (writer: "Rose Pregnant") | | |
| 2015 | Alvin and the Chipmunks: The Road Chip | (writer: "Joy Steals Cab") | | |
| 2016 | Disney Magic Kingdoms | (performer: "Elsa and Anna", "Epilogue") (writer: "Elsa and Anna", "Epilogue") | (Video Game) | |
| 2016 | Life Is | (music: "Let It Glow") | (Short) | |
| 2018 | Ralph Breaks the Internet | ["The Great Thaw", "Vuelie (Reprise)"] | | |
| 2019 | The Grand Tour | (writer: "Heading To The States") | (uncredited) (TV series) | |
| 2019 | Avengers: Endgame | (writer: "Ant-Man Theme") | | |
| 2019 | Frozen 2 | (producer: "Vuelie") (writer: "Vuelie") | | |
| 2020 | Trolls World Tour | (writer: "Trolls You Wanna Have Fun") | | |

== Appearances ==
Uncredited actor

| Year | Title | Role | Ref. |
|---|---|---|---|
| 2000 | Buffy the Vampire Slayer | Pianist | |

As himself

| Year | Title | Notes | Ref. |
|---|---|---|---|
| 2007 | Finding Kraftland | Documentary | |
| 2009 | Le grand journal de Canal+ | TV series documentary | |
| 2014 | Just Seen It | TV series | |
| 2016 | Score: A Film Music Documentary | Documentary | |
| 2017 | Original Motion Picture Soundtrack | Documentary | |
| 2018 | Score: The Podcast | TV series | |

== Accolades ==
| Year | Award | Category | Work | Result | Reference |
|---|---|---|---|---|---|
| 1998 | Emmy Award | Outstanding Music Composition for a Series (Dramatic Underscore) | Buffy the Vampire Slayer; For episode: "Becoming: Part 1" | Won | |
| 1998 | Gemini Awards | Best Original Music Score for a Dramatic Series | F/X: The Series; For episode "Quicksilver" | Nominated | |
| 1998 | Gemini Awards | Best Original Music Score for a Dramatic Series | F/X: The Series; For episode "Requiem for a Cop" | Nominated | |
| 2000 | OFTA Television Award | Best New Theme Song in a Series | Angel | Nominated | |
| 2002 | Emmy Award | Outstanding Music Direction | Buffy the Vampire Slayer; For episode "Once More, With Feeling" | Nominated | |
| 2006 | Stinker Award | Most Intrusive Musical Score | Zoom | Nominated | |
| 2007 | IFMCA Award | Best Original Score for a Comedy Film | The Pink Panther | Nominated | |
| 2010 | HMMA Award | Best Original Score - Indie Film / Documentary / Short | Waiting for 'Superman' | Won | |
| 2011 | IFMCA Award | Best Original Score for a Documentary Film | Waiting for 'Superman' | Nominated | |
| 2011 | SLFCA Award | Best Music | The Muppets | Nominated | |
| 2012 | ASCAP Award | Top Box Office Films | The Muppets | Won | |
| 2013 | Awards Circuit Community Awards | Best Original Score | Frozen | Nominated | |
| 2013 | ICP Award | Best Original Score or Soundtrack | Frozen | 10th place | |
| 2013 | PFCS Award | Best Original Score | Frozen | Won | |
| 2013 | SLFCA Award | Best Soundtrack | Frozen | Nominated | |
| 2013 | WAFCA Award | Best Original Score | Frozen | Nominated | |
| 2014 | Annie Awards | Outstanding Achievement in Music in an Animated Feature Production | Frozen | Won | |
| 2014 | DFCS Award | Best Original Score | Frozen | Nominated | |
| 2014 | Gold Derby Award | Original Score | Frozen | Nominated | |
| 2014 | HMMA Award | Best Original Score - Documentary | Red Army | Nominated | |
| 2014 | IFMCA Award | Best Original Score for an Animated Film | Frozen | Nominated | |
| 2015 | Grammy Awards | Best Score Soundtrack for Visual Media | Frozen | Nominated | |
| 2015 | HMMA Award | Best Original Score - Sci-Fi/Fantasy Film | Ant-Man | Nominated | |
| 2018 | Annie Awards | Outstanding Achievement for Music in an Animated Feature Production | Olaf's Frozen Adventure | Nominated | |
| 2018 | HMMA Award | Best Original Score - Sci-Fi/Fantasy/Horror Film | Ant-Man and the Wasp | Nominated | |
| 2018 | Kosmorama, Trondheim Internasjonale Filmfestival | Best Music | Den 12. mann | Nominated | |
| 2019 | HMMA Award | Best Original Score - Animated Film | Frozen 2 | Nominated | |
| 2020 | Annie Awards | Outstanding Achievement for Music in an Animated Feature Production | Frozen 2 | Nominated | |
| 2020 | Awards Circuit Community Awards | Best Original Score | Frozen 2 | Nominated | |
| 2020 | IFMCA Award | Best Original Score for an Animated Film | Frozen 2 | Nominated | |
| 2021 | Emmy Award | Outstanding Music Composition for a Limited or Anthology Series, Movie or Special (Original Dramatic Score) | WandaVision: Previously On | Nominated | |

== See also ==
- Music of the Marvel Cinematic Universe
