= Ivan Vulić =

Croatian architect (b. 1956)

- Born: November 16, 1956 (age 69); Jasenice, Zadar County
- Education: Faculty of Architecture, University of Zagreb
- Occupation: Architect
- Awards: Medal for Architecture (Croatian Chamber of Architects)
- Practice: VV-Projekt
- Buildings: Split Airport

Ivan Vulić (born 16 November 1956) is a Croatian architect. He graduated from the Gymnasium Vladimir Nazor in Zadar in 1975 and enrolled in Faculty of Architecture at University of Zagreb, where he studied under Božidar Rašica. Following graduation in 1980, he went to work for GP Ivan Lučić Lavčević in Split and ten years later become head of Lavčević's "Projektno-tehnološki biro" (later renamed "Projektiranje") one of largest architecture bureaus in the country. In 1995 he left GP Lavčević to establish his own practice, VV-Projekt.

Vulić designed hundreds of residential, commercial, ecclesiastical and transport buildings, among most renowned are large public housing project Meterize in Šibenik (1987–1990), office and retail building Lavčević in Split (with Lada Vrdoljak, 1996), affordable housing complex in Makarska (2003–2010) and Split Airport (2001–2019). Award-winning canopy structure (2001–2004) of Split Airport terminal inspired numerous similar designs around the world, most notably Northern entrance to Flemington Racecourse in Melbourne. Vulić has received the 2020 Medal for Architecture from the Croatian Chamber of Architects for the design of the new Passenger terminal at Split Airport.

Since mid 1980s he often collaborated with sculptor Vasko Lipovac on various projects including reconstruction of Old Waterworks building (hr) in Split, Ihtiodrom at Jadro Spring and unrealized public sculpture project that will later morph into monumental Red Flower erected next to Faculty of Economics in Split.

He was a professor at the Faculty of Civil Engineering, Architecture and Geodesy of University of Split from 2005 to 2014.

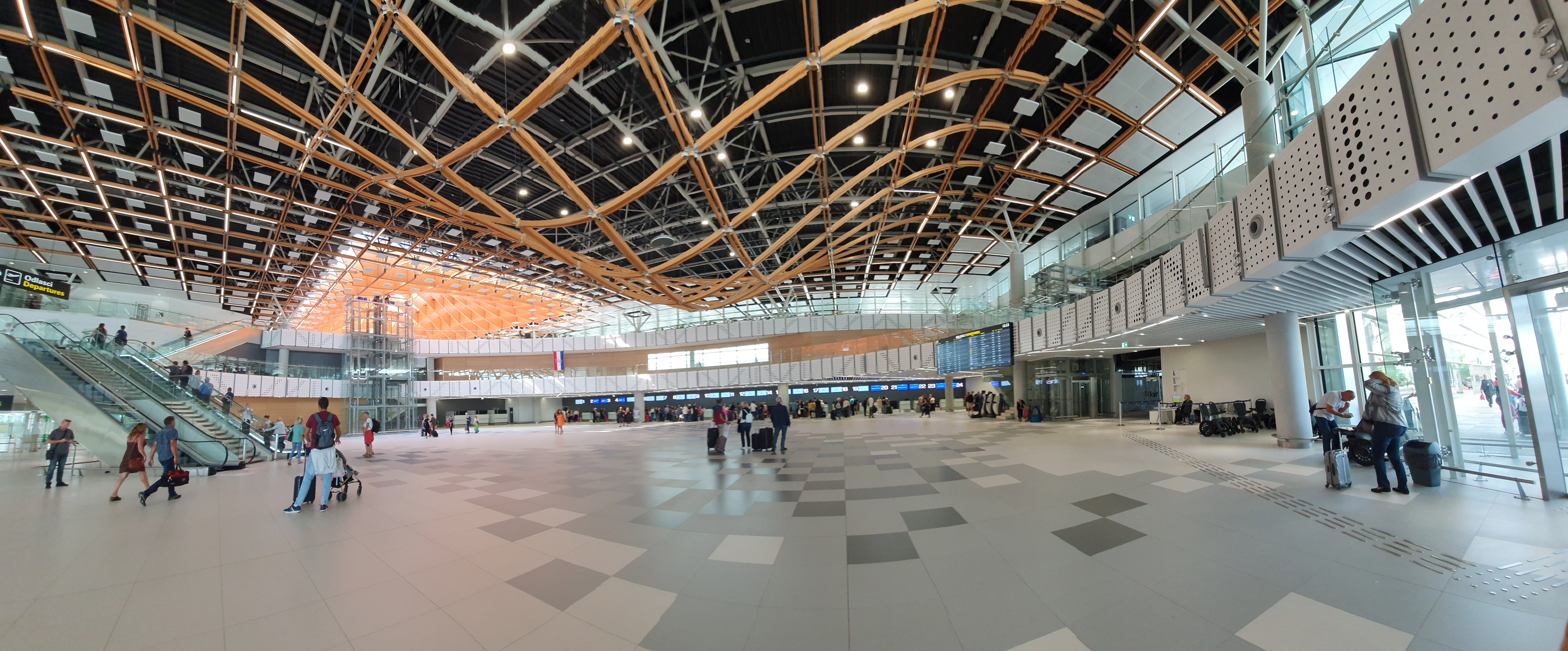
Split Airport, Passenger terminal interior
