= Hedgehog's Home =

- Directed by: Eva Cvijanović
- Based on: Ježeva kućica by Branko Ćopić
- Produced by: Vanja Andrijević; Jelena Popović
- Starring: France Castel; Rade Šerbedžija; Kenneth Welsh
- Cinematography: Ivan Slipcevic
- Music by: Darko Rundek
- Production companies: Bonobostudio; National Film Board of Canada
- Release date: 2017
- Running time: 10 minutes
- Countries: Canada; Croatia
- Language: English

Hedgehog's Home is a Canadian-Croatian short stop-motion animated film, directed by Bosnian Croat Eva Cvijanović and released in 2017. Based on a short children's story by Yugoslavian writer Branko Ćopić, the film's character is a hedgehog defending his home from a fox, a bear, a wolf and a wild boar. It is a co-production between Bonobostudio of Croatia and the National Film Board of Canada.

The film is narrated by Kenneth Welsh in English, France Castel in French and Rade Šerbedžija in Serbo-Croatian.

The film was a Canadian Screen Award nominee for Best Animated Short Film at the 6th Canadian Screen Awards, a Prix Iris nominee for Best Animated Film at the 20th Quebec Cinema Awards, and an Annie Award nominee for Best Animated Short Subject at the 45th Annie Awards. It was submitted to the 2018 Academy Awards for the Academy Award for Best Animated Short Film, but was not selected as a finalist.

The film was rated 4.8 out of 5 by Indie Shorts Mag and stated that Hedgehog’s Home is a film that'll appeal to a wide range of viewers, regardless of age. Straightforward and simple as the film is, plenty is up for interpretation and the story has much room to accommodate them.
