= Nicholas Delbanco =

American writer

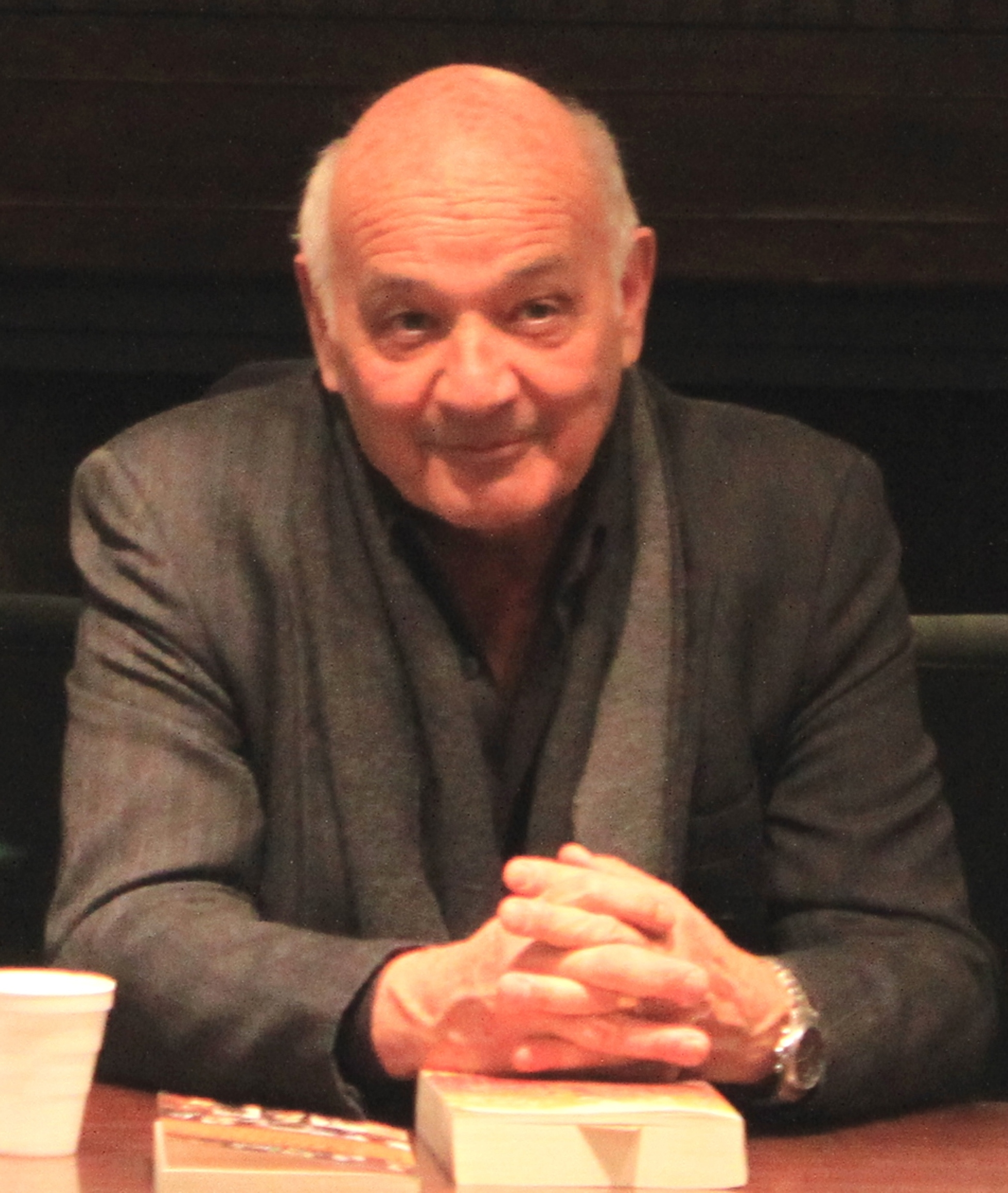
- Delbanco at a book signing in 2012
- Born: 1942 (age 83–84); London, England
- Occupation: Writer
- Spouse: Elena Greenhouse
- Children: 2, including Francesca Delbanco
- Relatives: Andrew Delbanco (brother); Bernard Greenhouse (father-in-law); Nicholas Stoller (son-in-law)

Nicholas Delbanco (born 1942) is an American writer.

== Life and career ==
Delbanco was born in London, England, the son of German Jewish parents Barbara (née Bernstein) and Kurt Delbanco, a businessman, art dealer, and sculptor. He was educated at Harvard University, graduating with a B.A. in 1963; and at Columbia University, with an M.A. in 1966. He taught at Bennington College, Bennington, Vermont, 1966–1984, and at Skidmore College, Saratoga Springs, New York, 1984–85. He was a visiting professor at such institutions also as Trinity College, Williams College, Columbia University and the University of Iowa. He was director of the MFA Program, and the Hopwood Awards Program at the University of Michigan, until his retirement in 2015.

He has published 30 books of fiction and nonfiction. His most recent novel is The Years (2013), and his most recent work of nonfiction is Curiouser and Curiouser: Essays (2017). In 2015, he published The Art of Youth: Crane, Carrington, Gershwin, and the Nature of First Acts. In 2016, he published the Omnibus collection, Dear Wizard: The Letters of Nicholas Delbanco and Jon Manchip White. In 2011, he republished Sherbrookes. This book brings his trilogy of novels (Possession, Sherbrookes, and Stillness from 1977, 1978, and 1980, respectively) between the covers of a single book. Sherbrookes is not simply a reissue of the three original novels together, but a revised edition of the trilogy without being a complete revision of the original story.

Delbanco has served as chair of the Fiction Panel for the National Book Awards, and as a judge for, among other contests, the PEN/Faulkner Award in Fiction and the Pulitzer Prize. He received a Guggenheim Fellowship in 1980, and twice, a National Endowment for the Arts writing fellowship.

== Personal life ==
Delbanco is the brother of Thomas L. Delbanco, a physician and Harvard professor, and social critic and historian Andrew Delbanco. He is married to Elena Greenhouse, daughter of Beaux Arts Trio cellist Bernard Greenhouse. They have two daughters, novelist and screenwriter Francesca Delbanco, and TIME editor Andrea Delbanco.

In 1962, while Delbanco was a student at Harvard, he was in a creative writing course at Harvard Summer School taught by John Updike, author and Harvard alumnus. Another student in this class was Jonathan Penner.

In the 1960s, Delbanco had a relationship with Carly Simon, which might be alluded to in her song "You're So Vain", but Simon refuses to confirm. Simon made a comment about the subject's identity as a guest artist on Janet Jackson's 2001 single, "Son of a Gun (I Betcha Think This Song Is About You)", which sampled "You're So Vain". Simon said about the song, "The apricot scarf" was worn by Delbanco.

== Works ==
=== Short stories ===
- The collection, About My Table, and Other Stories, publisher—William Morrow & Co, 1983
- The collection, The Writer's Trade, and Other Stories, publisher—William Morrow & Co.

=== Novels ===
- The Martlet's Tale. Lippincott. 1966.
- Grasse, 3/23/66. Lippincott. 1968.
- Consider Sappho Burning. Morrow, 1969.
- In the middle distance. Morrow. 1971.
- Small Rain. William Morrow & Co. 1975. ISBN 9780688028855.
- The Sherbrooke Trilogy (1977–1980)
- In the Name of Mercy. Warner. 1995. ISBN 978-0-446-51711-9.
- Delbanco, Nicholas (2000). What Remains. Warner Books. ISBN 978-0-446-67779-0.
- Old Scores. Warner Books. 2000. ISBN 978-0-446-67450-8.
- The Vagabonds. Warner Books. 2004. ISBN 978-0-446-53002-6.
- Spring and Fall. Grand Central Publishing. 2006. ISBN 978-1-58547-905-4.
- Delbanco, Nicholas (2008). The Count of Concord. Dalkey Archive Press. ISBN 978-1-56478-495-7.
- Sherbrookes: Possession / Sherbrookes / Stillness. Champagne, Ill: Dalkey Archive Press, 2011. ISBN 978-1-56478-587-9 (paper) ISBN 1-56478-587-4 (e-book)

"The Years", Little A books, 2017

=== Nonfiction ===
- Group Portrait: Joseph Conrad, Stephen Crane, Ford Madox Ford, Henry James, and H. G. Wells. William Morrow & Co. 1982. ISBN 9780688010171.
- Delbanco, Nicholas (2001). The Countess of Stanlein Restored. Verso. ISBN 978-1-85984-761-9.
- The Lost Suitcase: Reflections on the Literary Life. Columbia University Press. 15 October 2001. ISBN 978-0-231-11543-8.
- Running in Place. Grove Press. 2001. ISBN 978-0-8021-3809-5.
- The Sincerest Form, Fiction by Imitation. McGraw-Hill. 6 October 2003. ISBN 978-0-07-241471-4.
- Delbanco, Nicholas (2005). Anywhere Out of the World: Essays on Travel, Writing, and Death. Columbia University Press. ISBN 978-0-231-13384-5.
- Lastingness: The Art of Old Age. Grand Central Publishing. 24 January 2011. ISBN 978-0-446-19964-3.
- The Art of Youth: Crane, Carrington, Gershwin and the Nature of First Acts. New Harvest. 19 November 2013. ISBN 978-0544114463.

title: "Curiouser and Curiouser" Ohio State University Press, 2017

=== Editor ===
- Delbanco, Nicholas (1990). Speaking of writing. University of Michigan Press. ISBN 978-0-472-06422-9.
- The Sincerest Form, Writing Fiction by Imitation, publisher-McGraw-Hill, 2004
- Craft & Voice, an Introduction to Literature (w. Alan Cheuse), publisher—McGraw-Hill, 2012
