= Cyclus (installation art) =

- Artist: Vasko Lipovac
- Year: 1995
- Type: Installation
- Medium: painted wood and polyurethane
- Dimensions: 2 m × 2 m × 44 m (6.6 ft × 6.6 ft × 144 ft)
- Location: Atelje Vasko Lipovac, Split

Cyclus is a forty-meter long installation by Croatian artist Vasko Lipovac made for exhibition at Art Pavilion in Zagreb in 1995. It consists of 66 figures set at one meter high base depicting road bicycle race. Despite the strong stylization of the figures, each cyclist possesses individual features, facial expression and gestures in his preoccupation with the attempt to reach the finish line. The Olympic Museum in Lausanne acquired parts of original installation, “Two motorcyclists” and “Yellow Shirt”, in year 2000 and both have remained on permanent display there ever since. Cyclus was key inspiration behind wildly successful animated short Cyclists by Veljko Popovic.
