= Andrew Delbanco =

American professor and writer

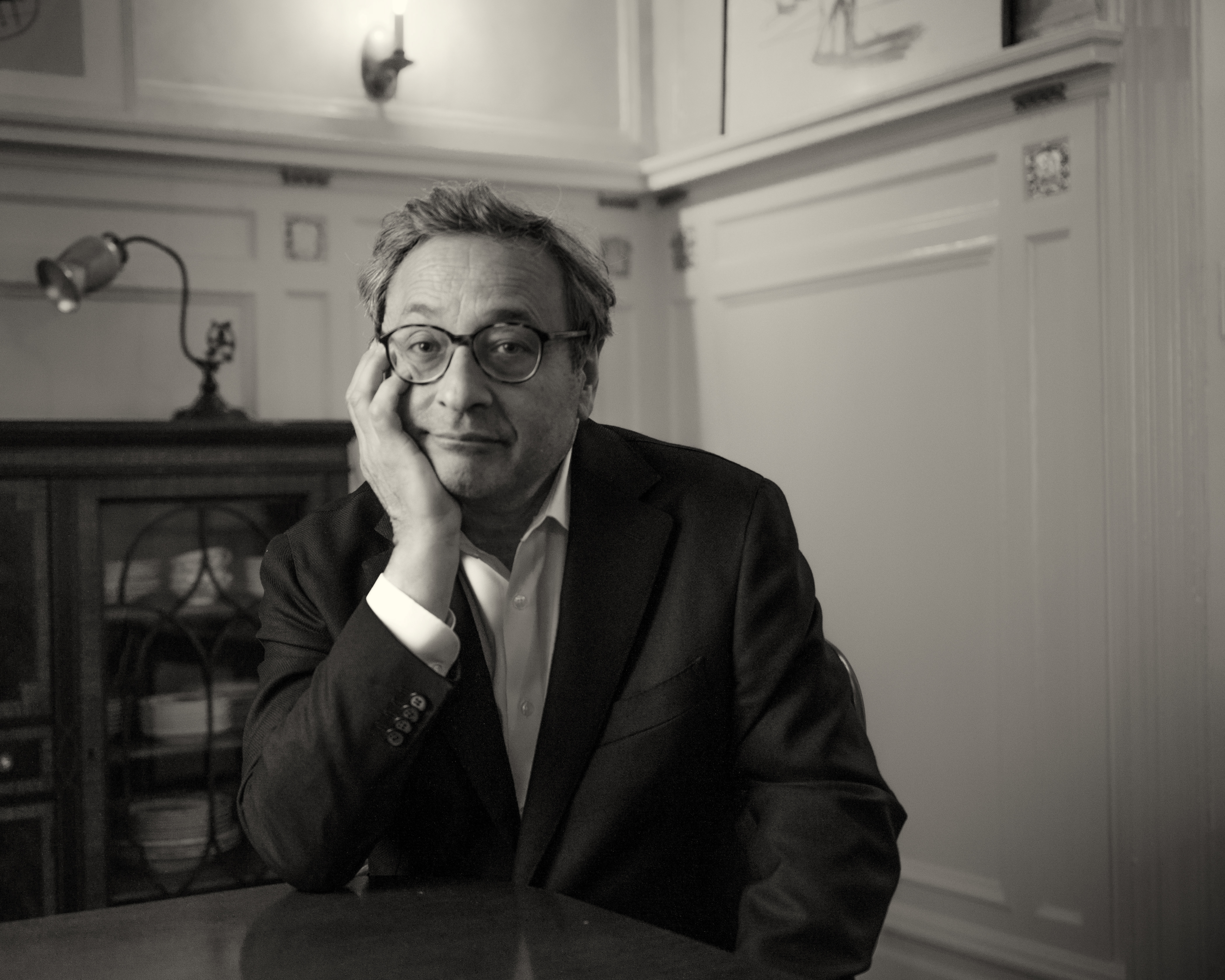
- Delbanco in 2022
- Born: 1952 (age 73–74); White Plains, New York, U.S.
- Education: Ethical Culture Fieldston School; Harvard University
- Occupations: Writer; professor
- Spouse: Dawn Ho (m. 1973)
- Children: 2
- Relatives: Nicholas Delbanco (brother); Francesca Delbanco (niece)

Andrew H. Delbanco (born 1952) is an American writer and professor. He is the Alexander Hamilton Professor of American Studies at Columbia University and the president of the Teagle Foundation.

He is the author of many books, including The War Before the War: Fugitive Slaves and the Struggle for America's Soul from the Revolution to the Civil War (2018), which won the Anisfield-Wolf Book Award for "books that have made important contributions to our understanding of racism and human diversity", and the Mark Lynton History Prize, sponsored by the Columbia Journalism School and the Nieman Foundation at Harvard, for a work "of history, on any subject, that best combines intellectual or scholarly distinction with felicity of expression". Melville: His World and Work (2005) was a finalist for the Los Angeles Times Book Prize in biography. He has written numerous essays on American history and literature, a selection of which appeared in Required Reading: Why the American Classics Matter Now (1997), as well as on U.S. higher education, in journals of culture and opinion, especially The New York Review of Books, The New Republic, and The Nation.

== Biography ==
Delbanco was born in White Plains, New York, the son of Jewish parents who fled from Germany to England before emigrating to the U.S. after the Second World War. He attended Fieldston School in Riverdale, New York, and received his undergraduate degree summa cum laude in English in 1973 from Harvard University, from which he also received his MA (1976) and PhD (1980). Delbanco taught at Harvard from 1981 to 1985 and since 1985 has been on the faculty of Columbia University, where, for twenty years, he held the Julian Clarence Levi Chair in the Humanities and, from 2005 to 2015, was the Mendelson Family Director of American Studies. He is the inaugural holder of the Alexander Hamilton Chair of American Studies, established at Columbia in 2015.

While serving as a trustee of the National Humanities Center (1996-2006), he chaired the Education Committee, which was instrumental in developing the center's work with high school teachers. Upon his appointment in 2018 to the presidency of the Teagle Foundation, he said that his aim was "to continue and deepen Teagle's support of people and programs committed to bringing the gift of liberal education to all students -- not just the privileged few".

In 2015, Delbanco gave a mini-lecture on Moby-Dick while riding with Stephen Colbert on the Nitro roller coaster at Six Flags Great Adventure amusement park in New Jersey.

== Personal ==
In 1973 he married his college classmate Dawn Ho, who teaches art history at Columbia. They have two children and four grandchildren.

== Writings ==
Delbanco’s early work, The Puritan Ordeal (1989), approaches New England Puritanism as a religious movement seeking moral stability in the context of nascent capitalism. In 1995 he published The Death of Satan, a study of changing concepts of evil in American history. The Real American Dream (1999) is an essay on spiritual longing in American life. Melville: His World and Work (2005), a critical study cast in the form of biography, portrays Herman Melville as a uniquely inventive literary artist who combined the moral gravity of the New England tradition with the irreverent energy of a New York sensibility. The War Before the War (2018), a narrative account of how fugitives from slavery helped drive the nation to civil war, stresses the conflict between law and conscience in the minds of judges, writers, clergy, and politicians who tried to reconcile private conviction with public duty.

Delbanco writes frequently about higher education. In a controversial article published in 1999 in The New York Review of Books, he attributed to the contemporary English department “the contradictory attributes of a religion in its late phase—a certain desperation to attract converts, combined with an evident lack of convinced belief in its own scriptures and traditions.” In subsequent articles, and in his book College: What It Was, Is, and Should Be (2012), based on the Stafford Little Lectures at Princeton, he traced the origins, development, and current state of higher education in the U.S.

== Awards and honors ==
Delbanco is an elected member of the American Philosophical Society and the American Academy of Arts and Sciences. He was vice president of PEN American Center from 1996 to 1999. In 2021 and 2022 he served as president of the Society of American Historians.

Three of Delbanco's books (The Puritan Ordeal, Melville, and The War Before the War) received the annual Lionel Trilling Book Award bestowed by a student committee at Columbia University.

In 2001, he was named by Time magazine as "America's Best Social Critic." In 2006, he received the Great Teacher Award from the Society of Columbia Graduates. In 2012, he was awarded a National Humanities Medal by President Barack Obama for "his writings on higher education and the place classic authors hold in history and contemporary life." In October 2022, he delivered the Jefferson Lecture in the Humanities, “the highest honor conferred by the federal government for intellectual achievement in the humanities.”

== Publications ==
=== Books ===
External videos
- Presentation by Delbanco on Required Reading, October 16, 1997, C-SPAN
- Presentation by Delbanco on The War Before the War, November 17, 2018, C-SPAN

- William Ellery Channing: An Essay on the Liberal Spirit in America (1981)
- The Puritan Ordeal (1989)
- The Death of Satan: How Americans Have Lost the Sense of Evil (1995)
- Required Reading: Why Our American Classics Matter Now (1997)
- The Real American Dream: A Meditation on Hope (1999)
- Melville: His World and Work (2005)
- College: What It Was, Is, and Should Be (2012)
- The Abolitionist Imagination (2012)
- The War Before the War: Fugitive Slaves and the Struggle for America's Soul from the Revolution to the Civil War (2018)

=== As editor ===
- The Puritans in America (1985)
- The Sermons of Ralph Waldo Emerson (1990)
- The Portable Abraham Lincoln (1992)
- Writing New England (2001)

=== Selected articles ===
- "A.A. at the Crossroads". The New Yorker, March 20, 1995 (co-authored with Thomas Delbanco)
- "The Decline and Fall of Literature". The New York Review of Books, November 4, 1999
- "Sunday in the Park with Fred" (on Frederick Law Olmsted). The New York Review of Books, January 20, 2000
- "Night Vision" (on Lionel Trilling). The New York Review of Books, January 11, 2001
- "Learning from Wiseman" (on Frederick Wiseman), ed. Joshua Siegel and Marie-Christine de Navacelle (Museum of Modern Art and Gallimard, 2010)
- "His Own Best Straight Man" (on Mark Twain). The New York Review of Books, February 24, 2011
- "Lincoln's Long Game". The New Republic, August 22, 2013
- "MOOCs of Hazard" (on online education). The New Republic, April 8, 2013
- "Mysterious, Brilliant Frederick Douglass". The New York Review of Books, April 7, 2016
- "A Great American Hater" (on John Quincy Adams). The New York Review of Books, Jan 17, 2019
- "Vexed and Troubled Englishmen: How Should We Remember the Puritans?". The Nation, December 2/9, 2019
- "Night Terrors", on Rod Serling and The Twilight Zone. The New York Review of Books, Nov. 19, 2020
- "John C. Calhoun: Protector of Minorities?". The New York Times Book Review, February 28, 2021
- "Stanley Kubrick's Human Comedy". The New York Review of Books, May 13, 2021
- "The University Crisis", The Nation. February 21/28, 2022
- "Endowed by Slavery", The New York Review of Books. June 23, 2022
- "Reparations for Black Americans Can Work. Here's How". The Washington Post, November 21, 2022
- "On Reparations". Liberties, Spring 2023
- "Great Books Can Heal Our Divided Campuses". The Wall Street Journal, June 9, 2023
- "A Hell of a Performance" (on Norman Mailer). The New York Review of Books, April 18, 2024
- "The Connoisseur of Desire" (on The Great Gatsby). The New York Review of Books, May 29, 2025
- "The Universities and Humility". Liberties, July 6, 2026
