= Miriam Del Banco =

Jewish-American poet and educator (1858–1931)

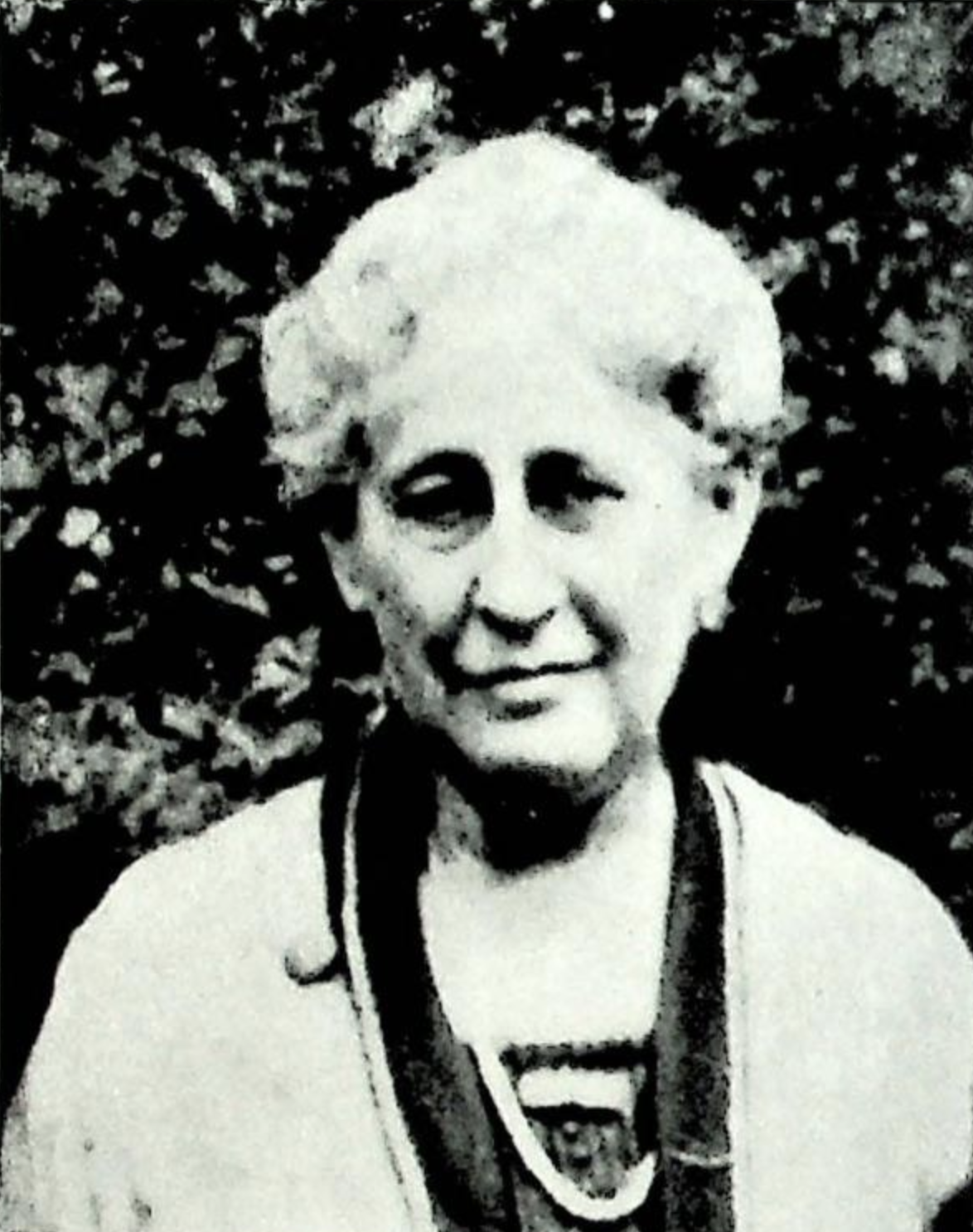
- Born: June 27, 1858; New Orleans, Louisiana, United States
- Died: November 6, 1931 (aged 64); Chicago, Illinois, United States
- Education: DePaul University
- Occupations: Poet, educator
- Writing career
- Language: English

Miriam Del Banco (June 27, 1858 – November 6, 1931) (Note: June 27, 1858, according to The Jewish Encyclopedia.) was a Jewish-American poet and educator.

== Biography ==
Miriam Del Banco was born in New Orleans, Louisiana, to German-Jewish parents Johanna (née Meyer) and Rabbi Max del Banco. Her father died shortly after her birth, and the family moved to St. Louis. Later she was sent to her uncle Louis Meyer at Cape Girardeau, Missouri, where she attended the State Normal School.

After completing the course with honors, she rejoined her mother, who in the meantime had relocated to Chicago, in which city Del Banco obtained in 1885 a position as teacher in the public schools. In 1889 she became assistant principal at the Von Humboldt School. In 1904, she became principal of the McClellan Elementary School, and four years later, principal of the Motley Public School. She would go on to receive a Ph.D. from DePaul University in 1921.

Del Banco was a frequent contributor to the Jewish and general press, having written a large number of poems, both Jewish and secular. Most of her prose publications appeared in educational journals. She likewise translated Meyer Kayserling's Die jüdischen Frauen in der Geschichte, Literatur und Kunst, which appeared as a serial in the columns of the Jewish Advance and was published in Chicago in 1881; and Conrad Alberti's Ludwig Börne, which appeared in the Menorah, 1888–89. She recited her poem "White Day of Peace" at the 1893 Jewish Women's Congress, receiving a standing ovation.

A collection of Del Banco's poetry was published after her death under the title Poetry and Prose.

== Selected publications ==
- "Modern Yom Kippur". The Jewish Tribune. 3 (6). Saint Louis: 1. October 1, 1880.
- "The Menorah". The Menorah. 1: 36–37. 1886.
- "White Day of Peace". Papers of the Jewish Women's Congress. Held at Chicago, September 4, 5, 6 and 7, 1893. Philadelphia: The Jewish Publication Society of America. 1894. p. 13.
- "Friday Night / Moses Mendelssohn / B'nai B'rith / Sir Moses Montefiore". The Standard Book of Jewish Verse. New York: Dodd, Mead, and Co. 1917. pp. 268, 615, 691, 723.
- Poetry and Prose. Chicago: H. L. Palmer. 1932.
