= Francesca Delbanco =

American novelist and screenwriter

- Born: May 1974 (age 51)
- Education: Harvard College; University of Michigan (MFA)
- Occupations: Novelist; screenwriter
- Spouse: Nicholas Stoller (m. 2005)
- Children: 3
- Father: Nicholas Delbanco
- Relatives: Andrew Delbanco (uncle); Bernard Greenhouse (grandfather)

Francesca Delbanco (born May 1974) is an American novelist and screenwriter. She is best known for co-creating television series Friends from College (2017–2019) and Platonic (2023–present).

== Early life and education ==
Delbanco was born in May 1974 and grew up in Bennington, Vermont. She is the daughter of writers and faculty members at Bennington College, Elena (née Greenhouse) and Nicholas Delbanco. Delbanco attended Harvard College, concentrating in history and literature of the United States and writing her senior thesis on William Faulkner's novel Go Down, Moses and concepts of familial honor in the Old South. She also took creative writing workshops, studying with Jayne Anne Phillips, Jamaica Kincaid and Richard Ford, and went on to earn an MFA from the University of Michigan.

== Career ==
Between college and her MFA program, Delbanco worked in New York City for two and a half years, briefly in publicity for Warner Books, then for Seventeen magazine where she was an editorial assistant, then staff writer.

In 2004, Delbanco published a novel, Ask Me Anything.

In 2017, the serial comedy Friends from College debuted on Netflix, created by Delbanco and her husband Nicholas Stoller, who also directed the series. The first season, consisting of eight half-hour episodes drew some negative reaction, particularly criticism of a central plotline featuring an affair; however, Netflix viewers continued to watch the show and it was renewed for a second season. The second season premiered January 11, 2019.

== Personal life ==
In 2005, Delbanco married screenwriter and director Nicholas Stoller, whom she met at a playwriting workshop for Harvard alumni in 2001. (While Delbanco and Stoller overlapped at Harvard and were aware of one another, they weren't directly acquainted.) They live in Los Angeles, California with their three children.
