= Just Seen It =

Just Seen It is a film and television review show created by David Freedman in 2010. It started on YouTube as a tribute to Siskel and Ebert's At the Movies. The first episode appeared on the web in January 2010, and the last episode in January 2015. More than 1,000 reviews were produced, covering newly released features, network and cable television shows, new releases on Blu-ray and DVD, and interviews with industry leaders such as director Michael Apted and actor Richard Portnow.

Just Seen It aired on PBS SOCAL/PBS OC, from September 2012 to January 2013, with 20 episodes, and was offered through NETA (National Educational Telecommunications Association) to 370 PBS stations nationwide starting January 16, 2013.
