= Bonobostudio =

Croatian animation production company

Bonobostudio is an animation production and distribution company headquartered in Zagreb, Croatia.

== History ==
It was founded by Vanja Andrijević in 2008, who previously worked at the now defunct Kenges Animation/VFX studio as a distributor. The newly founded Bonobostudio continued to develop shorts from the previous company, and released its first film in 2010, Arheo 29 by veteran experimental film-maker and artist Ladislav Knežević. Since then, the company produced a host of award-winning animated shorts such as Imbued Life (Ivana Bošnjak, Thomas Johnson, 2019), Hedgehog's Home (Eva Cvijanović, 2017), Nighthawk (Špela Čadež, 2016), Planemo (Veljko Popović, 2016) and Sonámbulo (Theodore Ushev, 2015). The company gets much of its funding through the Croatian Audiovisual Centre.

Part of its films are made free to watch on Vimeo.
