= Leo Junek =

Croatian-French painter

- Born: Leo Junek; 25 September 1899; Zagreb, Austria-Hungary
- Died: 13 July 1993 (aged 93); Orsay, France
- Education: Zagreb Academy of Fine Arts
- Movement: Post-Impressionism, Cubism, Fauvism, Dadaism
- Children: Eveline, Danièle, Francis Junek

Leo (Leopold) Junek (25 September 1899 – 13 July 1993) was a Croatian–French painter. He was a founding member of the Group Zemlja (Earth Group), one of the most influential movements in the history of Croatian art. He studied at the Zagreb Academy of Fine Arts, and subsequently moved to France, where he spent the rest of his life and was known as Lorris Junec. He is remembered for his sharp, geometric, colourful landscapes inspired by Post-Impressionism, Cubism, Fauvism, and Dada.

== Life in Croatia (1899–1925) ==
=== 1899–1918 ===
Leo Junek was born in Zagreb on 25 September 1899. According to the baptismal register of the parish of St. Mark in Zagreb, his mother was Marija Junek (née Oražem) and his stepfather, Teodor Junek, a grocer with whom he had a difficult relationship. He was baptised by the chaplain Dionizije de Vukovar, in the Old Town parish church, on 2 October 1899.

A well-known rumour concerning his lineage attested that he was the illegitimate son of Hugo Mihalović, fifth son and only priest in the wealthy Mihalović family which originated from Slavonia, and settled in Zagreb in the 19th century. Hugo's brother, Antun Mihalović, served as Ban of Croatia from 29 June 1917 until 20 January 1919. Although he obtained a doctorate from the Gregorian University of Rome, Hugo contented himself with the life of a priest, and dedicated his life to his passion for music.

In 1909, Junek enrolled in Zagreb's Kaptol Jesuit Seminary, where he learned music and sang as a chorister in the cathedral choir. His education was interrupted from 1914 to 1916, when the family moved to the then distant district of Bukovac (today part of Zagreb). In 1916, he re-enrolled in the Seminary, this time as a cleric. In 1918, he passed the matura examination at the Upper Town Gymnasium, and enrolled at the Faculty of Law of the University of Zagreb. According to multiple written sources (Babić, Hegedušić, Horvat, Zidić), and a letter exchanged between Junek and the Baroness Vera Nikolić Podrinska, his studies were funded by his birth father, Hugo Mihalović. It was not uncommon for the aristocracy to discreetly support their illegitimate descendants, especially if exceptionally gifted. In Junek's case, he had a gift for music and painting, and he left the Faculty of Law after one year of study.

=== 1919–1925 ===
In the autumn of 1919, Junek enrolled at the Temporary Higher School of Arts and Crafts (today Zagreb's Academy of Fine Arts), to study painting. He was first taught by Ferdo Kovačević and Maksimilijan Vanka, before specialising with Ljubo Babić. He also studied alongside Đuro Tiljak, Oton Postružnik, Vinko Grdan and Ivan Tabaković, with whom he would later form the Group Zemlja (Earth Group), a Croatian arts collective active in Zagreb from 1929 to 1935, aimed to defend artistic independence against foreign influences such as Impressionism or Neoclassicism and "art for art's sake". In fact, it was with Junek that Krsto Hegedušić first discussed the group's orientation and mindset. Towards the end of his studies, Junek visited Paris on a trip funded by the Baroness Vera Nikolić Podrinska, and fell in love with the city. He discovered the works of Paul Cézanne, who would become his most prominent source of inspiration. Throughout his life, he would often describe "finding his God in Paris: Cézanne". His instant love for Paris is recounted in his notebooks:

"When I saw the city, I returned to Zagreb, finished my studies with Babić, completed my diploma, exhibited with Ulrich, received a scholarship for Paris ... and I am still in Paris."

Junek graduated in 1924 and married the young Ana Fiket. He then spent five months in Plješivica, where he painted oils and sketched in preparation for his first exhibition. Returning to Zagreb with a series of portraits (still lives and nude studies), he opened his first solo exhibition at the Salon Anton Ulrich, where he showed 21 oil paintings. The exhibition received mixed reviews.

In the summer 1925, Junek was granted a French government scholarship, and he left with his wife for Paris.

== Life in France (1925–1993) ==
=== 1925–1930 ===
Junek arrived in Paris on 8 December 1925, with ambition to develop his own style and expression. He spent a lot of time alone studying French, Italian and Flemish painting. At the Louvre, he produced copies after Poussin, Rembrandt, Chardin, Corot and naturally, Cézanne. He also read extensively, and took great interest in books on French painting and music of the 15th and 18th centuries. Unlike most foreign art students, he did not pursue his studies at André Lhote's private academy, and let his style evolve naturally, free of Lhote's Post-Cubism.

On 21 May 1927, Junek's first daughter Hughette (also known as Eveline) was born. That same year, Junek participated in the Salons d'Automne at the Grand Palais. Between 1926 and 1927, he continued to develop his own style and form, and painted l'Autoportrait à l'écharpe, Une figure féminine, Au pied du Mur, La Nature morte au panier de fraises, and another Autoportrait à l'écharpe. These compositions are fresh in their colour schemes and clear in their conception, announcing Junek's signature geometric, colourful style. Later, they received much critical acclaim, while many Croatian artists sought to attach them to the Zemlja (Earth) programme. As Junek gradually disapproved of a collective, communal approach to artistic expression, and was relatively uninterested in political engagement, his affinities with the Zemlja group diminished over time. He refused to participate in future group exhibitions, and later explained that the reasons behind this decision were entirely artistic, and never political.

Junek participated in an exhibition for the Institut d'études slaves at the Parc de l'Observatoire, with three oils: Au pied du mur, Autoportrait devant le mur and Autoportrait (1926). Also exhibiting were Krsto Hegeduśiç, Juraj Plančić, Slavko Brill, Lazar Ličenoski, Sergije Glumac, Juraj Dobrović, Milan Konjović, and Petar Lubarda. Although Junek settled in France permanently, he remained close to the Croatian art scene. He regularly sent his works to Zagreb, and was shown in numerous galleries and exhibitions. He also exhibited internationally: his Autoportrait devant le mur was shown at the 1929 Barcelona International Exposition, and in 1930, his Nature morte au panier de fraises and Autoportrait devant le mur were shown at the Tate Gallery in London. Around the same time, Junek was selected for an exhibition in Belgrade, and showed his works in the Croatian section of the Cvijeta Zuzorić Art Pavilion.

=== 1931–1941 ===
In 1933, Junek painted the portrait of his daughter Eveline à la mandoline and Glaïeuls. With his oil on canvas Cubes, he developed a complex play of form and colour. The painter Josip Vaništa would later praise this painting in a letter: "Junek's Cubes is a masterpiece that reaches Račić's Le Pont des Arts, the very summit of our art."

Junek's painting proved influential to a large number of Croatian artists of the mid 20th century, including: Vera Nikolić Podrinska, Edo Kovačević, Slavko Kopač, Antun Mezdjić, and later, Edo Murtić and Josip Vaništa.

In 1935, Junek's second individual exhibition, "Leo Junek (Paris)", took place at the Modern Gallery, Zagreb. He exhibited 73 works, most of his Parisian œuvre over the previous ten years, which proved largely influential on Croatian painting. Amongst his works shown were: Glaïeuls, Cubes, Saint Gervais, Suresnes sur la Seine, La Porte de la Chapelle, Le Toit, Cheminées d'usine, Aubervilliers I and II.

Junek continued to work in Paris and showed little interest in promoting his works, having the safety net of French government funding. Persuaded by his friends, he showed three oils to Berthe Weill, an art dealer who owned a successful gallery and regularly exhibited Cézanne, Picasso, Matisse, and Raoul Dufy. In this gallery, Dufy spotted Junek's Glaïeuls, and invited him to his studio, where he was shown Eveline à la mandoline, and a few watercolours. A friendship bloomed from this meeting. Dufy helped Junek secure funding, and even offered one of his three studios in Pigalle.

From 1935 to 1939, Junek continued to paint and exhibit in group shows in Zagreb and Belgrade. In 1939, he lost his government funding, which strained his finances. In the midst of a world war, many artists fled to the South of France or the United States, and a few Croatian painters based in France returned to Zagreb. Junek resisted the urge to leave. In 1940, he produced Le Dessinateur (The Draftsman), his most famous work and last portrait. Shortly after, on 1 June 1940, his second daughter Danielle was born.

Throughout his life, Junek passionately sought to explore colour: its values, forms and laws. In his works Le Dessinateur and Maternité Port Royal, he does not deny reality, but rather seeks to represent it in the form of an enigma that the beholder must resolve. Grgo Gamulin sees in Le Dessinateur the origins of Junek's interest in abstraction, and the birth of a "lyrical, 'tachist' style of painting in France".

=== 1942–1952 ===
During the Paris Occupation, Junek stayed mostly indoors and didn't paint much. He started journaling, and writing about painting and music, an activity he kept until the end of his life. In 1946, he started painting again. At an exhibition, he befriended Jean René Bazaine, with whom he shared his vision of painting as inextricably indebted to the art of Poussin. Junek left Paris in search of more peaceful scenery, and settled in the quiet neighbourhood of Orsay in 1950. In 1951, he travelled to Chartres to study the cathedral and the famous stained-glass windows, and became passionate about French medieval painters, especially Jean Fouquet. During this time, Junek also started exploring Provence, and the places that Cézanne had painted years earlier. His sketchbooks document his visits to Aix-en-Provence and Cézanne's workshops.

=== 1953–1973 ===
In 1968, Junek befriended the Swiss writer and critic Georges Borgeaud, who took a liking to his works, and with the help of Bazaine, assisted the painter in preparing for his first solo exhibition in Paris, at the gallery Pierre Domac.

Junek's Provence landscapes became more and more abstract, depicting subjects in enigmatic forms. In a notebook, he declared:

All of painting is figurative, and everything is abstract. The landscape: trees, the wind, the morning. It is the rhythm that interests me above all. The conception is different to what it used to be fifty years ago. In the past, I used to frame the landscape, now, I search for movement, what I call rhythm. The painting is just a surface, it is a screen. There lies the difference.

=== 1974–1993 ===
Between 1974 and 1977, Junek received multiple signs of public interest. The Fonds National d'Art Contemporain (FNAC) bought his large oil on canvas Harmonia Mundi. The Paul Cézanne Museum in Aix-en-Provence requested a second canvas. In 1974, he received French citizenship. In 1975, he became an associate member of the Académie Croate des Sciences et des Arts. A large retrospective exhibition was organised at the Galerie du Centre Culturel du Marais, with a catalogue written by Georges Borgeaud, Olivier Clément, and Gabrielle Althen.

Between 1975 and 1980, Junek travelled every year to Italy and visited 'art capitals' such as Milan, Florence, Venice, Padua, Ravenna, and Genoa. He also visited The Hague in 1979, and delighted in Vermeer's paintings. In autumn 1981, he exhibited sixteen watercolours at the Galerija 11 in Zagreb. For the first time, the Croatian public was introduced to his latest, more abstract style.

Junek produced the majority of his works in his garden in Orsay: Trois tomates, Nature morte Pot et pinceaux, Le pot bleu, Siège trépied, Hommage à Chardin, etc. He participated in a few exhibitions at Paul Cézanne's studio in Aix-en-Provence, including one in 1991 where he showed three watercolours. He also exhibited at the 1991 Exposition collective des maîtres de la peinture française contemporaine (also known as Une rencontre exceptionnelle) in Rosny-sur-Seine. Also exhibiting were the painters Pierre Tal-Coat, Jean Bazaine, Vieira da Silva, Jean Le Moal, Alfred Manessier, and Zao Wou-Ki.

Junek continued to paint until the end of his life. He died in Orsay on 13 July, age 94. Many artists, critics and writers came forward to pay homage to his œuvre. Tomislav Lalin wrote his "Late Homage to Lorris Junec – painter of two nations". Josip Vaništa, Georges Borgeaud, Daniel Mohen, Jean Bazaine and many others wrote about Junek's impact on French and Croatian painting. His descendants, admirers and collectors have kept his œuvre alive ever since.

His work is given in its raw form, open to the naked senses, clearly and meaningfully. His departure is an irreparable void in the art of painting.

It has been argued that Leo Junek was the inspiration for Miroslav Krleža's character Filip Latinovicz, in The Return of Philip Latinowicz.

== Style ==
Leo Junek's painting ranged from a loose Post-Impressionist, figurative style to a more Fauvist and Cubist approach in his later years. He is remembered for his striking geometric landscapes and urban motifs, depicted with sharply contrasting colours, or large spots of colours within defined outlines. His distinctive style sets him apart from his contemporary artists and painters in French and Croatia.

Junek was a passionate musician, and played the harpsichord. In a letter to Vera Nikolić Podrinska, he explains that pieces like Palestrina's Mass, Couperin's Prelude for harpsichord, or Debussy's Sonata for flute, viola and harp, best illustrated the "structure" of painting that he so dearly wanted to figure out.

=== Influence of Paul Cézanne ===
In a letter to Vera Nikolić Podrinska on 29 June 1951, Junek said: "Cézanne revealed to me that a stain can be extracted from a displayed object and analysed independently."

== Collections ==
Junek's work is held in the permanent collection of the National Museum of Modern Art, Zagreb, the Museum of Contemporary Art, Zagreb, and the National Museum in Belgrade.

== Solo exhibitions ==
- 1925. First Solo Exhibition, Ulrich Salon, Zagreb
- 1935. Izložba Leona Juneka (Paris), Moderna galerija, Zagreb
- 1968. Leo Junek, Moderna galerija, Zagreb
- 1969. Lorris Junec ou la Grâce de peindre, Galerie Pierre Domec, Paris
- 1972. Lorris Junec, Centre culturel du Marais, Paris
- 2007. Leo Junek = Lorris Junec: 1899–1993., Galerija Klovićevi dvori, Zagreb

== Bibliography ==
- Lorris Junec; Suzanne Junec: Une Vision De La Peinture: Extraits Des Carnets De 1950 a 1989, Harmattan, 2001, ISBN 9782747509657
- Biserka Rauter Plančić: Leo Junek, Zagreb, Difo, 2008.
