= Oton Postružnik =

Croatian artist, painter, graphic artist and ceramist

- Born: 26 March 1900; Maribor, Austria-Hungary (today's Slovenia)
- Died: 21 January 1978 (aged 77); Zagreb
- Education: Zagreb, Prague, Paris
- Known for: painting, graphics, ceramics
- Movement: lyrical abstraction

Oton Postružnik (1900–1978) was a Croatian artist, painter, graphic artist, and ceramist. He was one of the founding members of the Earth Group artist collective in Zagreb from 1929 to 1933. He studied in Zagreb, Prague and Paris, and was a professor at the Academy of Fine Arts in Zagreb from 1950 to 1970. He is best known for his abstract paintings of natural subjects, such as his Leaf series.

Oton Postružnik received the Vladimir Nazor Award for lifetime achievement in 1964.

== Biography ==
Oton Postružnik was born 26 March 1900 in Maribor, then in Austria-Hungary, today in Slovenia. His childhood was spent in Pregrada, where he completed his primary school education in 1910. Following that, he began high school in Krapina, but in 1913 the family moved to Zagreb. There, in 1915, Postružnik enrolled at the private art school of Ljubo Babić. In 1917 he participated in an anti-Hungarian demonstration, where he gave a speech, and received a warning from the authorities.

In 1918, Postružnik completed his high school education and enrolled at the College of Art in Zagreb. By 1920, he left to spend some time in Prague, returning in 1922 to continue his studies at the newly founded Academy of Fine Arts. He studied drawing with Maximilian Vanka, painting with Ljubo Babić, and graphics with Tomislav Krizman. He was also one of the first students to study ceramic techniques with Hinko Juhn.

Postružnik opened his own private art school, along with the painter Ivan Tabaković, which they ran until the end of the 1920s. In 1924, he received a royal government scholarship and spent some time studying in Paris. In 1927 he graduated from the academy in Zagreb.

Postružnik was one of the founders of the Earth Group (Zemlja), an artists' association that was established in early 1929. He participated in all their exhibitions until he left the group in 1933. He received a scholarship from the French government in 1935, and went to Paris for a second time.

In 1937 he organized his first solo exhibition in the Salon Ulrich in Zagreb. In 1950 he was elected professor at the Academy of Fine Arts in Zagreb, where he worked until 1970.

He received the Vladimir Nazor Award for lifetime achievement in the arts in 1964.

Oton Postružnik died on 21 January 1978 in Zagreb.

== Legacy ==
Oton Postružnik was a painter, graphic artist, and ceramist, one of the founding members of the Earth Group, an arts collective which brought together artists, architects and intellectuals in Zagreb between 1929 and 1935. The group focused on natural subjects, and promoted the development of a strong native style, rather than simply copying techniques from elsewhere in Europe. Other members of the group were sculptors Antun Augustinčić and Frano Kršinić; painters Vinko Grdan, Krsto Hegedušić, Leo Junek, Omer Mujadžić, Kamilo Ružička and Ivan Tabaković; and the architect Drago Ibler.

In the 1950s and '60s, Postružnik began to use landscape in a more abstract way. The lyrical expressionism movement was spreading across Europe, and in Croatia many artists such as Edo Murtic were developing natural themes in a very individual way. Postružnik himself focused on what might be called micro-landscapes, such as his series of individual leaves painted large-scale, and interpreted in shimmering colours.

Retrospective exhibitions of Postružnik's work, including paintings, drawings and ceramics have been held at the Modern Gallery, the Museum of Contemporary Art in Zagreb, and the Gallery of Fine Arts in Split. In addition, his paintings have appeared in special themed exhibits of major Croatian artworks of the twentieth century.

In 2000, the Croatian Postal Service issued a stamp with Postružnik's "Klek", 1929, as part of its Croatian Modern Art series.

== Works ==
- Klek, 1929
- At the Fair, 1930
- Expectation, 1934
- Landscape (a port), 1939
- Landscape from Zuljana on Peljesac, 1952
- Dalmatian Landscape, 1952
- Lunatic from Sipan, 1954
- Autumn, 1958
- Autumn II, 1958
- Composition, 1960
- Leaf series, 1961-2
- Fallen Tree, 1965

== Exhibitions ==
During his lifetime, Oton Postružnik held many solo exhibitions in addition to participating with the Earth Group.

=== Solo exhibitions ===
Recent exhibitions of his work include:

- 1976 Oton Postružnik retrospektiva, Modern Gallery, Zagreb
- 1972 Oton Postružnik – Gallery of Fine Arts, Split
- 1963 Oton Postružnik – Gallery of Fine Arts, Split
- 1962 Oton Postružnik retrospective, Museum of Contemporary Art, Zagreb

=== Group exhibitions ===
- 2010 Intimism in Croatian Fine Art 1930–1950, Modern Gallery, Zagreb
- 2009 Alternative Landscapes of the 1950s to 1960s – From Nature to Vision, Art Pavilion, Zagreb

=== Public collections ===
Oton Postružnik's work can be found in the following public collections

Croatia

- Museum of Contemporary Art, Zagreb
- Modern Gallery, Zagreb
- Gallery of Fine Arts, Split
- Museum of Modern Art, Dubrovnik
- Gallery of Fine Arts, Osijek
- Arsenal Gallery, Hvar

== Bibliography ==
- Enciklopedija hrvatskih umjetnika (gl. ur. Žarko Domljan) Leksikografski zavod Miroslav Krleža, Zagreb 1996.
- Catalog Oton Postružnik : retrospektiva, 1923–1976. Authors Oton Postružnik; Željko Grum; Ivanka Riberski; Published by Moderna galerija (Zagreb, Croatia), 1976
