= Earth Group =

Croatian art collective

The Earth Group (Croatian: Grupa Zemlja) was a Croatian arts collective active in Zagreb, Croatia from 1929 to 1935, when it was banned. The group aimed to defend their artistic independence against foreign influences such as Impressionism or Neoclassicism and art for art's sake. They maintained that art should mirror the social milieu from which it springs and should meet contemporary needs, hence their emphasis on the popularization of art, both at home and abroad. In spite of its ideologically heterogeneous membership, the group was considered Marxist in orientation but never espoused socialist realism.

== Members and guests ==
- Founding members of the group: sculptors Antun Augustinčić and Frano Kršinić; painters Vinko Grdan, Krsto Hegedušić, Leo Junek, Omer Mujadžić, Oton Postružnik, Kamilo Ružička and Ivan Tabaković; and the architect Drago Ibler (who also served as the group's chairman).
- Members who later joined the group: Marijan Detoni, Ivan Generalić, Željko Hegedušić, Fedor Vaić, Vilim Svečnjak, Edo Kovačević, Branka Hegedušić-Frangeš, Ernest Tomašević, Lavoslav Horvat, Stjepan Planić and Mladen Kauzlarić.
- Guest artists whose works were shown at some of the group's exhibitions: Otti Berger, Petar Franjić, Drago Galić, Stjepan Gomboš, Aleksander Mikloš, Franjo Mraz, Josip Pičman, Danilo Raušević, Petar Smajić, and Zdenko Strižić.

== Exhibitions ==
- 1st exhibition (as Udruženje umjetnika Zemlja) at Salon Ulrich in Zagreb, 1929
- 2nd exhibition (as L'Association artistique "Zemlja") at Gelerie Billiet in Paris, 1931
- 3rd exhibition (as Udruženje umjetnika Zemlja) at Umjetnički paviljon in Zagreb, 1932
- 4th exhibition (as Udruženje umjetnika Zemlja) at Umjetnički paviljon in Zagreb, 1934
- 5th exhibition (as Družestvo Zemlja - Zagreb) at Galerija Preslav in Sofia, 1934
- 6th exhibition (as Udruženje umjetnika Zemlja) at Umjetnički paviljon Cvijete Zuzorić in Belgrade, 1935

== Literature ==
- Angeli Radovani, Kosta (1971). 6. zagrebački salon : kritička retrospektiva "zemlja" : slikarstvo, grafika, crtež, kiparstvo, arhitektura : Umjetnički paviljon, Zagreb, 8. svibnja-8. lipnja 1971 (in Croatian). Yugoslav Academy of Sciences and Arts Modern Gallery. OCLC 500719470.
