= Gallery of Fine Arts, Split =

Art museum in Split, Croatia

Museum of Fine Arts, Split
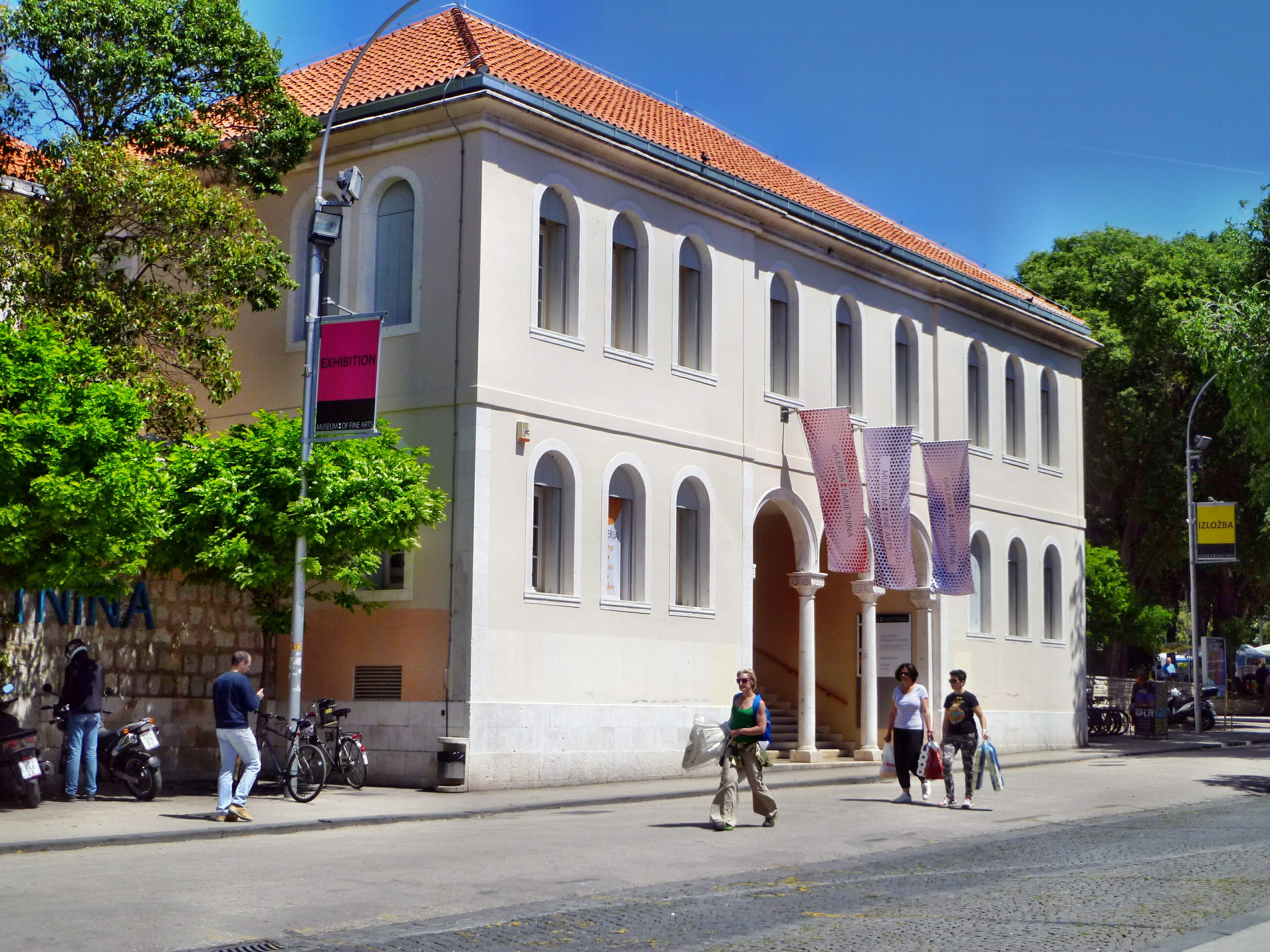
- Established: 1931
- Location: Kralja Tomislava 15, 21000 Split, Croatia
- Coordinates: 43°30′55″N 16°26′17″E
- Director: Branko Franceschi
- Website: www.galum.hr

The Museum of Fine Arts (Croatian: Galerija umjetnina), is an art museum in Split, Croatia containing works from the 14th century up to the present day providing an overview of the artistic developments in the local art scene. The museum was founded in 1931, and has a permanent exhibition of paintings and sculptures that includes works by major Croatian artists such as Vlaho Bukovac, Mato Celestin Medović, Branislav Dešković, Ivan Meštrović, Emanuel Vidović and Ignjat Job. The museum also has an extensive collection of icons, and holds special exhibits of works by contemporary artists.

In 2009 the museum relocated to new premises in the old hospital building in Split, completely refurbished to provide a fully modern exhibit space.

== History ==
In 1908, a Dalmatian art exhibition was held, the first to bring modern art to the city. Local artists, writers, musicians and architects at that time were training in other parts of Europe, bringing back exciting new trends. The Dalmatian governor, Nicholas Nardelli, bought several pieces from the show to form the basis of a new art gallery, giving them into the care of Kamilo Tončić, the director of the School of Crafts. Over the next 20 years, the collection grew and the art gallery idea was promoted. Approval was granted by the city in 1928, and the first exhibit opened to the public in 1931. Originally housed in a building in Lovretska Street, the museum's first director was Kamilo Tončić, the curator was Angjeo Uvodić, and restorer Cata Dujšin. At the grand opening some 300 works of art were on display, from a total of 500 in the permanent collection.

Over the years the collection grew through acquisitions, donations and bequests, most notably from Ivo Tartaglia, who donated over 300 works of art from his private collection. During the period 1950–1979, under the direction of Kruno Prijatelj, the gallery started running art education programs, published numerous publications, and began organizing exhibitions by contemporary artists. Today, holdings number more than 3,500 works covering the period from the 14th century up to the present day, representing all the major artistic developments in the area.

Space in the original premises was limited and in 2001, Split City Council granted use of the old hospital building for conversion into a new exhibiting space. Because of the sensitive historic nature of the building (which dates from 1792) and its location next to the north wall of Diocletian's palace, the renovation necessarily involved the Ministry of Culture and its Department for Protection of Cultural Heritage – Conservation Department in Split. Following the refurbishment, a fully modern exhibition space was created, appropriate for museum's growing collection. The new museum provides office and restoration workshops, as well as public areas and exhibit spaces.

The ground floor is designed with an indoor atrium and north terrace with space for concerts, lectures and other performances throughout the year. The indoor atrium also offers visitors a bookstore, museum shop, and café. Upstairs is the main exhibit space for the permanent collections. The north wing houses the restoration workshops, and an archive library.

== Collections ==
The museum's permanent collection includes more than 3,500 works of art dating from the 14th century up to the present day. The holdings provide an overview of all the major art movements and trends in the local area, and include works by Croatian artists and artists from the former Yugoslavia, Italy, Germany, Austria, France, and the Czech Republic, all of whom have a connection to Split.

The museum's restoration department focuses on the conserving the works and preparing them for public display. The museum also houses a large documentation archive of graphics, publications, press clippings, and photograph library.

=== Icons ===
The Museum of Fine Arts has one of the richest icon collections in Croatia, with works from the 15th to 19th century on display. In addition to those from the Cretan School, and Ionian school, holdings include icons from Russia and from the Greek mainland. Of special interest are icons from the 18th–19th century painted by masters from Boka Kotorska. The icons are mostly of small and medium sizes, indicating the original purpose of private devotion.

=== Old masters ===
The early section covers 14th–18th centuries, and most notably includes work by the 14th-century Venetian artist Paolo Veneziano. Other artists include Andrija Alesi and Juraj Čulinović (15th century), Albrecht Dürer, Andrija Medulić (16th century), Girolamo Brusaferro, and Matej Ponzoni and Federiko Benković (17th century).

=== 19th century and modern art ===
The collection of 19th century and modern art forms the largest part of the museum's holdings. From the 19th century, the portraits by Juraj Pavlović and Ivan Skvarčina are notable. The collection contains paintings by Vlaho Bukovac, Emanuel Vidović, Mato Celestin Medović, Ignjat Job, Juraj Plančić and Marino Tartaglia. Sculptural works include pieces by Ivan Rendić, Branislav Dešković and Ivan Meštrović.

The collection also contains works by Vladimir Becić, Oskar Herman, Miroslav Kraljević, Ljubo Babić, Jerolim Miše, Ljubo Ivancić, Antun Kaštelančić, Edo Murtić, Kosta Angeli Radovani, Antun Masle, Slavko Kopač, Sava Šumanović, Nadežda Petrović, Petar Dobrović and Branko Ružić.

=== Contemporary art ===
The collection of contemporary art contains works of Croatian artists from the 1950s to the present day. Best known are the works of Ivo Dulčić, Ljubo Ivančić, Slavko Kopač, Ferdinand Kulmer, Branko Ružić, Ivan Kožarić, and Đuro Seder. Constructivist and geometric trends in Croatian art are represented by members of the groups EXAT-51, and New Tendencies, such as Ivan Picelj, Julije Knifer and Juraj Dobrović. From the 1980s, there are works by Damir Sokić and Nino Ivančić, and a group that once formed the artistic core of Split: Kuzma Kovačić, Vasko Lipovac, Kažimir Hraste and Gorky Žuvela. The younger generation of Croatian artists are represented by Ana Opalić, Lauren Živkovića Kuljiša, Viktor Popović.

== See also ==
- List of museums in Croatia
