= Augustinčić =

Augustinčić is a surname. Notable people with the surname include:

- Antun Augustinčić (1900–1979), Croatian sculptor
- Josip Augustinčić, fictional character in Sve će biti dobro
