= Branislav Dešković =

Croatian sculptor (1883–1939)

- Born: 11 March 1883; Pučišća, island of Brač, Austria-Hungary (today's Croatia)
- Died: 20 August 1939 (aged 56); Zagreb, Yugoslavia (today's Croatia)
- Education: Venice, Vienna, Paris
- Known for: sculpture

Branislav Dešković (1883–1939) was a Croatian sculptor, best known for his expressive animal sculptures, especially his hunting dogs. He is considered the first Impressionist sculptor in Croatia.

== Biography ==
Branislav Dešković was born in Pučišća on the island of Brač, on 11 March 1883. He trained in Venice, Vienna and Paris, where he regularly exhibited at the Paris Salon. A contemporary review of the first Dalmatian Art Exhibition of 1908 in The Studio said "Branislav Deskovic's mastership in animal sculpture was proved by his works The Draught Horse, The Ass, and The Dog. Two Old Ones is the best of all his compositions, and has been exhibited in the "Salon" of Paris, where it gained much approbation."

In the summer of 1910, Dešković spent time in Sarajevo. There he was attracted by the Bosnian figures, and later showed several outstanding sculptures for example Two Elders, and Bust of a Turk. He was an avid hunter, and this was reflected in his artistic work. He is best known for his animal sculptures, particularly hunting dogs. During a stay in Sarajevo in 1910, he was inspired by Bosnian figures, which showed in several of his sculptures.

He exhibited with the Medulić group in 1908 in Split, 1909 in Ljubljana, and 1910 in Zagreb. He held his first solo exhibit in 1910 in Sarajevo.

During the First World War, he volunteered in Montenegro, and later in Rome, Geneva and Paris. From 1921 he lived in Split.

The art gallery in Bol, on Brač, the Galerija umjetnina "Branislav Dešković is named after him, and much of his work is on display there.

He died in Zagreb on 20 August 1939.

== Legacy ==
Although Pučišča and Brač have a long history of stone-working, Dešković chose bronze as his medium. He worked in stone, clay and bronze, and is considered the first Impressionist Croatian sculptor.

Dešković is best known for his animal sculptures. A keen hunter in his youth, he portrayed hounds from his memory of working with the animals, in an expressive impressionist style. He also produced some fine portraits and a few large, heroic sculptures. Carried along by the motto of the Zagreb exhibition "Despite Unheroic Times", Dešković created the monumental sculptures Prince Marko (Kraljević Marko), and Victory of Freedom (Pobjeda slobode), which were unusual expressions of his political views. His career was cut short by illness, and his collection of works is not extensive.

HRT, Croatian Radio/Television featured Branislav Dešković in the program segment than can be seen here (in Croatian): HRT Video:Kipar Branislav Dešković

== Works ==
Examples of his work can be seen online at Galerija Remek-Djela.

- Two Old Men/Two Elders (Dva starca)
- Draught Horse (Tegleći konj)
- Rest (Odmor)
- Scratching Dog (Pas koji se češe)
- Bust of a Turk (Poprsje Turčina)
- Prince Marko (Kraljević Marko)
- Victory of Freedom (Pobjeda slobode)

== Exhibitions ==
During his lifetime, he exhibited in Split, Zagreb and Ljubljana

=== Solo exhibitions ===
Recent exhibitions of his work include:

- 2011 Galerija Antun Augustinčić, Klanjec
- 1983 Gallery of Fine Arts, Split
- 1966 Gallery of Fine Arts, Split

=== Public collections ===
His work can be found in the following public collections

Croatia

- Gliptoteka, Croatian Academy of Sciences and Arts, Zagreb
- Gallery of Fine Arts, Split
- Art Gallery Branislav Dešković (Galerija umjetnina Branislav Dešković), Bol, island of Brač, Croatia

US

- Smithsonian American Art Museum, Washington, DC

== Bibliography ==
- Posmrtna izložba Branimira Deškovića Author:Cvito Fisković. Published by Hrvatsko društvo umjetnosti, Podružnica Split 1990
- Branislav Dešković Author:Duško Kečkemet. Publisher: Supetar : Brački zbornik; Zagreb : Grafički zavod Hrvatske, 1977
