= Zlatko Sirotić =

Croatian painter and illustrator

Zlatko Sirotić (born 19 February 1945) is a Croatian painter and illustrator. Sirotić graduated from the School of Applied Art in Zagreb, Graphic Department in 1965 and from the Zagreb Academy of Fine Arts (Department of Painting, class of Professor Šime Perić) in 1971. Worked in the master workshop of Professor Krsto Hegedušić from 1971 to 1974. He lives and works in Zagreb.

Sirotić has participated in more than 200 group exhibitions around the world.

His one-man exhibitions include: 1977 Zagreb (Studio galerije Karas), 1978 Zagreb (Salon galerije Karas), 1978 Zagreb (Galerija Nikola Tesla), 1980 Gornja Stubica (Muzej seljačkih buna Gornja Stubica), 1981 Zagreb (Galerija Josip Račić), 1981 Dubrovnik (Galerija međunarodnog slavističkog centra Republike Hrvatske), 1982 Pula (Galerija Centar za scenske i likovne djelatnosti), 1982 Buzet (Zavičajni muzej Buzet), 1983 Poreč (Galerija Eufrazijana), 1985 Zagreb (Galerija RANS Moša Pijade), 1985 Buzet (Zavičajni muzej Buzet), 1985 Ivanić Grad, 1986 Novi Vinodolski, 1987 Zagreb (Galerija-knjižnica Novi Zagreb-Travno), 1988 Dieburg (Galerie Hohe Strasse), 1988 Erlenbach (Galerie Erlenbach), 1989 Zagreb (Galerija Miroslav Kraljević), 1989 Comune di Quattro Castella („Sala esposizioni“-Piazza Dante), 1993 Zagreb (Galerija INA-COMMERCE), 1994 Zagreb (Galerija CEKAO), 1995 Bakar (Galerija Morčić), 2000 Bakar (Galerija Morčić), 2002 Ivanić Grad (Pučko otvoreno učilište Ivanić Grad), 2003 Buzet (Pučko narodno sveučilište), 2006 Rijeka (Galerija Juraj Klović), 2007 Zagreb (Galerija Vladimir Filakovac).
