= Antun Augustinčić =

Croatian sculptor, political commissar and university teacher

- Antun Augustinčić in his studio photographed by Tošo Dabac
- Born: 4 May 1900; Klanjec, Croatia-Slavonia, Austria-Hungary (now Croatia)
- Died: 10 May 1979 (aged 79); Zagreb, SR Croatia, Yugoslavia (now Croatia)
- Education: Zagreb Academy of Fine Arts; École des Arts Décoratifs; École des Beaux-Arts
- Known for: Sculpture

Antun Augustinčić (4 May 1900 – 10 May 1979) was a Croatian sculptor active in Yugoslavia and the United States. Along with Ivan Meštrović and Frano Kršinić, he is considered one of the three most important Croatian sculptors of the 20th century. His most notable sculptures include the Peace monument which stands in front of the United Nations building in New York City, the Miner statue in front of the International Labour Organization headquarters in Geneva, and the sculpture of Yugoslav president Josip Broz Tito, present in several copies throughout former Yugoslavia.

== Early life ==
Augustinčić was born in the small town of Klanjec in the Hrvatsko Zagorje region in northern Croatia, which was at the time part of Austria-Hungary. In 1918 he enrolled at the Arts and Crafts College in Zagreb, where he studied sculpting under professors Rudolf Valdec and Robert Frangeš. After the college became the Royal Academy of Arts and Crafts in 1922, he studied under the guidance of Ivan Meštrović until his graduation in 1924. He then received a scholarship from the French government and continued his studies at the École des Arts Décoratifs and École des Beaux-Arts in Paris under the guidance of Jean Antoine Injalbert.

In 1925 and 1926 Augustinčić held his first exhibitions in Paris, before returning to Zagreb and exhibiting in Zagreb in 1926 and then again in 1927 in Lwów and Zagreb. In 1929 he was one of the founding members of the Earth Group (Croatian: Grupa Zemlja) arts collective which brought together prominent left-oriented sculptors, painters and architects, such as Drago Ibler, Krsto Hegedušić, Ivan Tabaković, Ivan Generalić, and many others. Augustinčić took part in several exhibitions organised by the group between 1929 and 1933, when he left the group, two years before it was banned by the authorities in 1935.

== Rise to prominence ==
In 1930 Augustinčić created his first equestrian sculpture for the monument in Niš, after his design won the competition out of the 23 works submitted, with prominent Yugoslav sculptors Risto Stijović and Sreten Stojanović coming in second and third. From then on equestrian statues became one the hallmarks of his career, notable examples being the monument to Józef Piłsudski in Katowice, Poland (commissioned in the 1930s but placed in 1991) and his most notable work, the Peace monument, erected in front of the United Nations building in New York in 1954. In the late 1930s he also created a couple of monuments to King Alexander in Sombor and Skopje (which were later destroyed in World War II), as well as several sculptures of Croatian politician Stjepan Radić. Other notable works from this period include several family tomb headstones at the Mirogoj Cemetery in Zagreb, including Sorrow (1930), Moses (1932) and Icarus (1935).

In 1940 he became a corresponding member of the Yugoslav Academy of Sciences and Arts (JAZU) and his works were featured in the 1940 documentary film Croatian Sculptors (German title: Bilhauerkunst in Kroatien) filmed by Oktavijan Miletić. During the war Augustinčić remained active and was commissioned to sculpt a bust of the Croatian Poglavnik Ante Pavelić. In 1943, he defected to the Yugoslav Partisans' movement and the same year made the bust of Josip Broz Tito in Jajce. In 1946 Augustinčić became a professor at the Academy of Fine Arts in Zagreb, and after the war he was made a member of the People's Assembly.

In 1949 he was made a full member of the Yugoslav Academy, and from the 1950s onwards he started making portraits, art nudes, and figurative sculptures. In the years after the war he made a number of notable sculptures, such as the monuments to Josip Broz Tito in Tito's birthplace of Kumrovec (1948), politician Moša Pijade (1953), violinist Zlatko Baloković (1962), 16th century Croatian writer Marin Držić (1963) and many others. His most important sculpture in this period is The Carrying of the Wounded (Croatian: Nošenje ranjenika), which evolved from a sketch made in 1944 and which he used as a recurring motif in a number of monuments he created in the following three decades, one of which can be seen in front of the Faculty of Medicine in Zagreb.

Augustinčić, together with the Serbian painter Đorđe Andrejević-Kun, also designed all of the Yugoslav orders and decorations, and he also created the coat of arms of the Socialist Republic of Croatia (with Vanja Radauš).

During his visit to Yugoslavia, the Emperor of Ethiopia Haile Selassie met Augustinčić on the Brijuni islands. The Emperor invited Augustinčić to design a monument which will commemorate victims of Italian reprisals in Addis Ababa and stated "Who better than you will be able to portray the suffering of victims of fascism?". Augustinčić accepted the invitation and called his colleague Frano Kršinić with whom he designed the Monument to the Victims of Fascism, also known as the Yekatit 12 Monument. After he completed Yekatit 12 monument, Augustinčić also constructed the Monument to the Ethiopian Partisan in Holeta Military Academy and the Monument to Ras Mӓkonnen in Harar. To provide feedback and instruction for the Harar monument, the renowned Ethiopian artist Afewerk Tekle went to Zagreb where he exchanged ideas with Augustinčić.

In 1970 Augustinčić donated his works to his native town of Klanjec, where a gallery exhibiting his works opened in 1976. His last great work was the memorial dedicated to the 1573 Peasants' Revolt and its leader Matija Gubec, which was erected near Oršić Castle in Gornja Stubica in 1973. The monument is made of bronze and stone and features a relief covering 180 m^{2} (1,900 sq ft).

Augustinčić died on 10 May 1979 in Zagreb, aged 79.

== Gallery ==
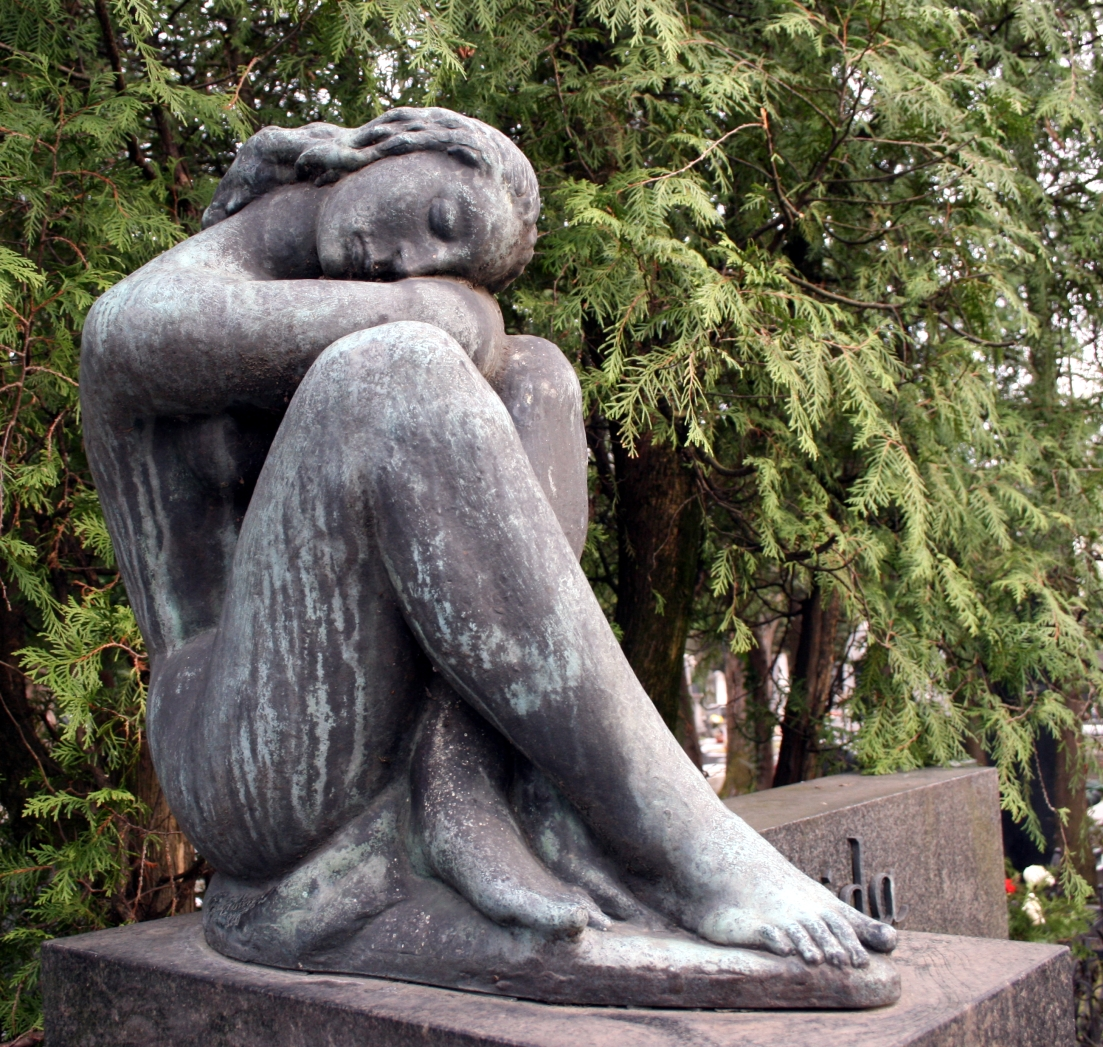
Sorrow, monument at the Vajda family tomb, Mirogoj cemetery in Zagreb, 1930

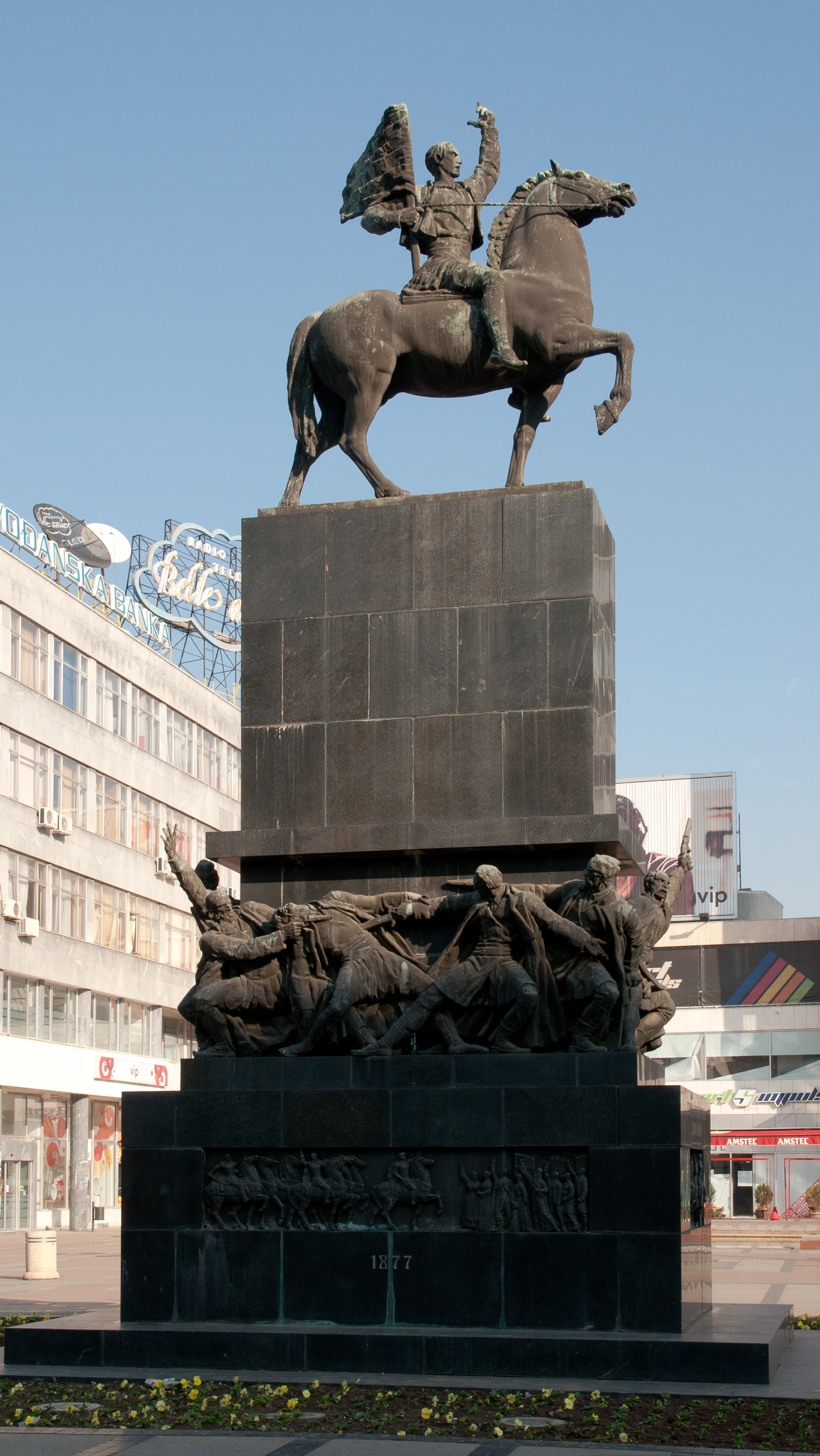
Monument to Liberators of Niš, 1937

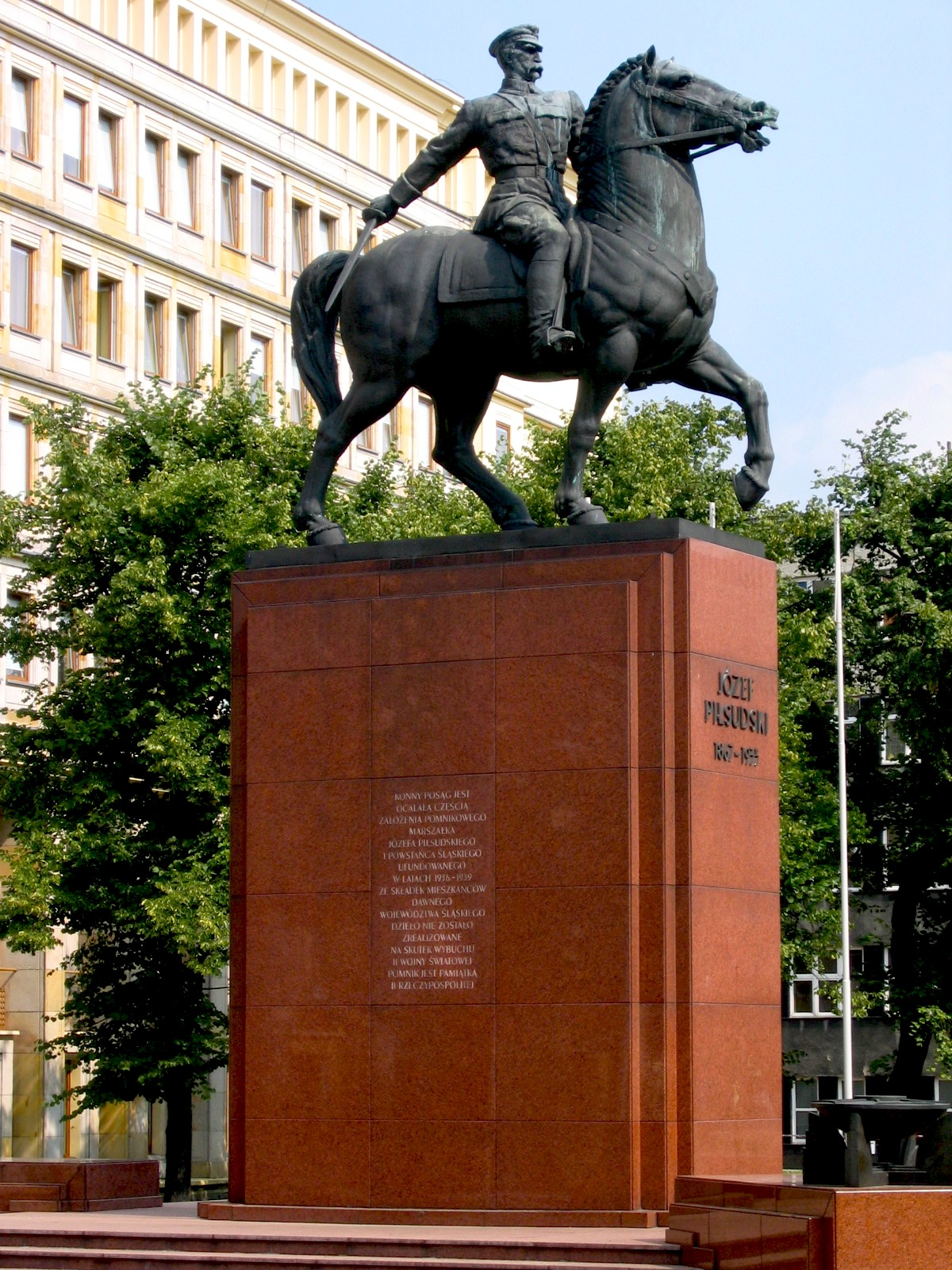
Józef Piłsudski monument in Katowice, Poland, 1936–39

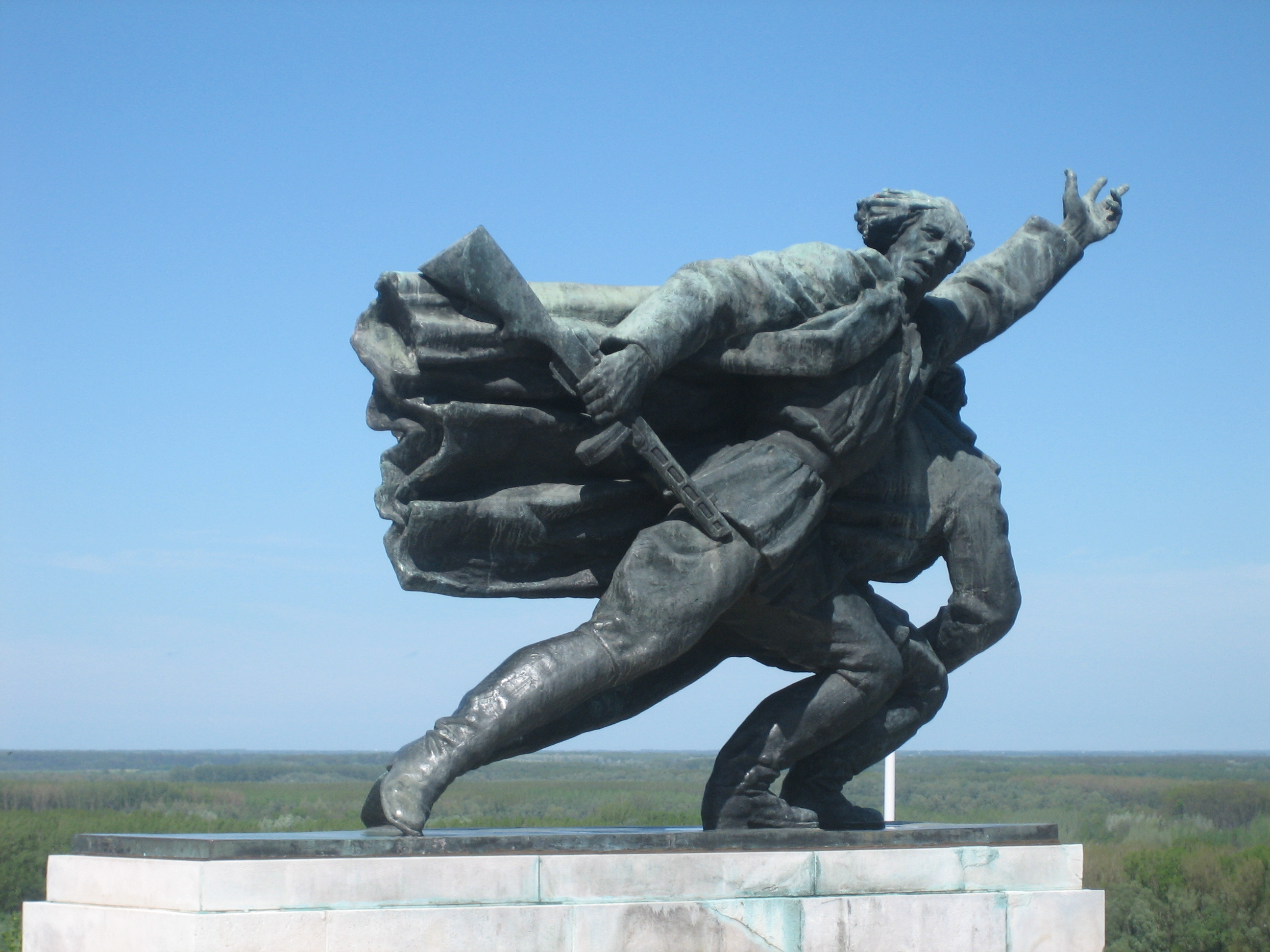
Monument Victory at the Battle of Batina Memorial in Batina, 1947

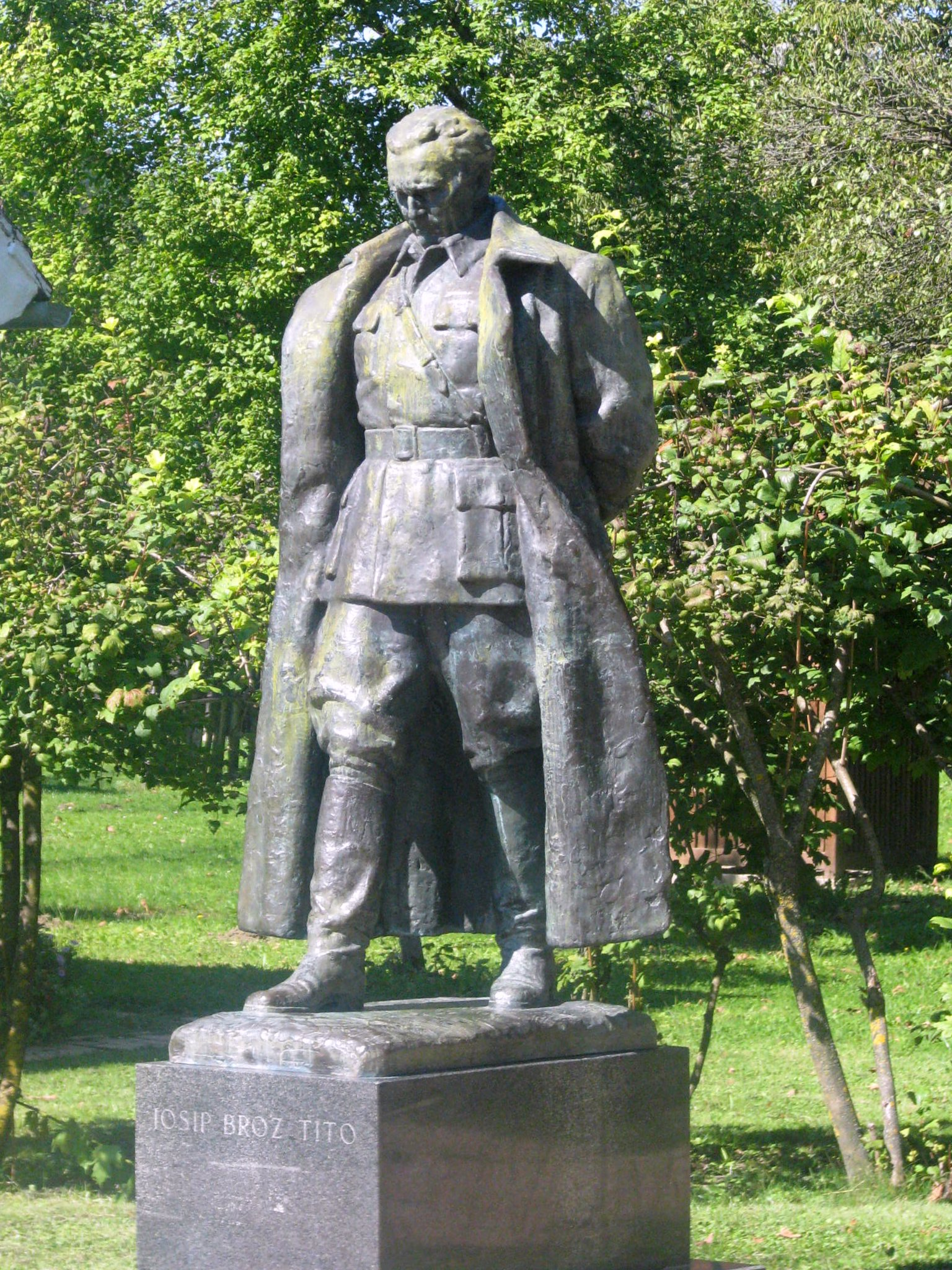
Josip Broz Tito monument in Kumrovec, 1948

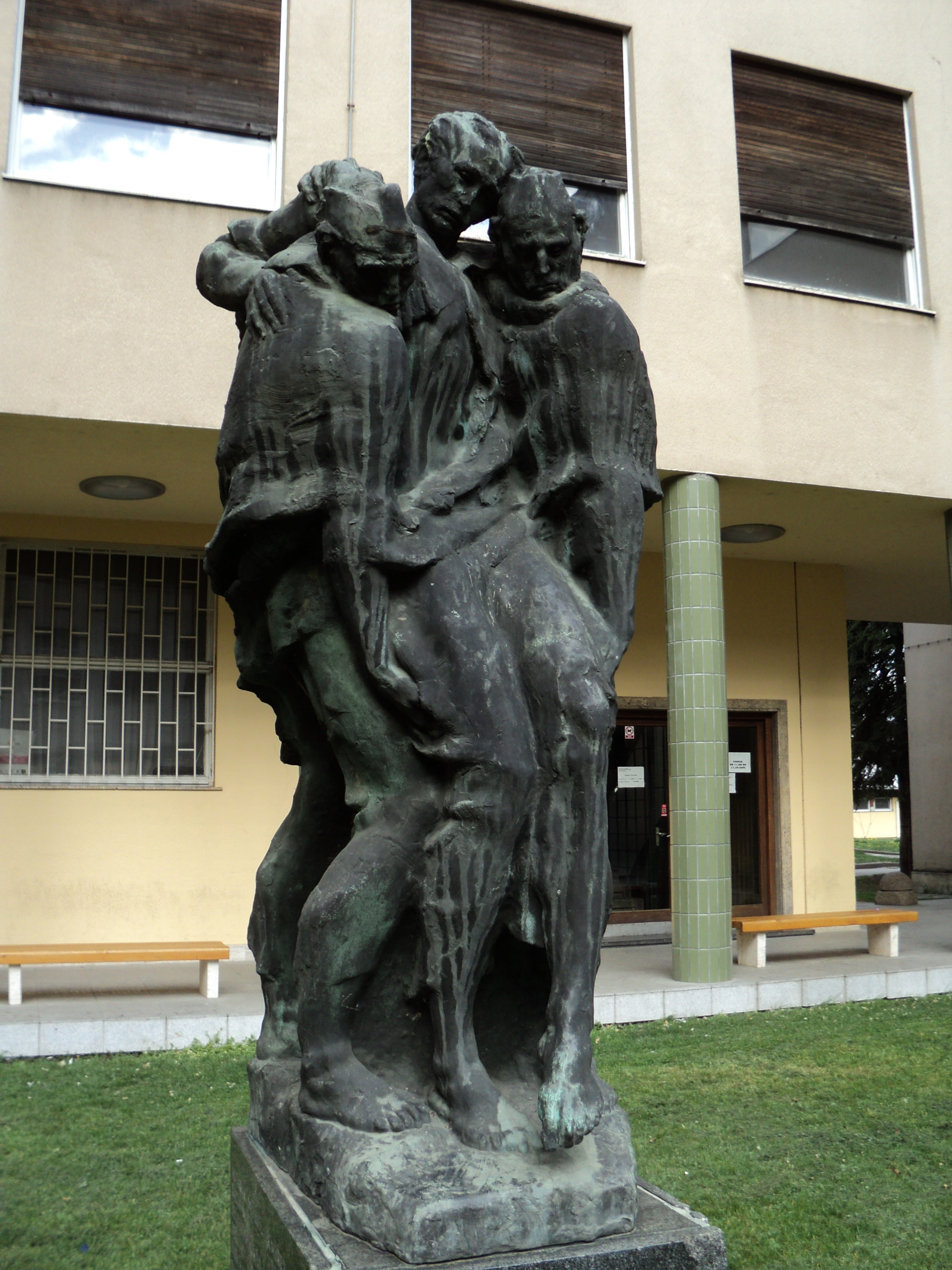
The Carrying of the Wounded, Faculty of Veterinary Medicine in Zagreb, 1953

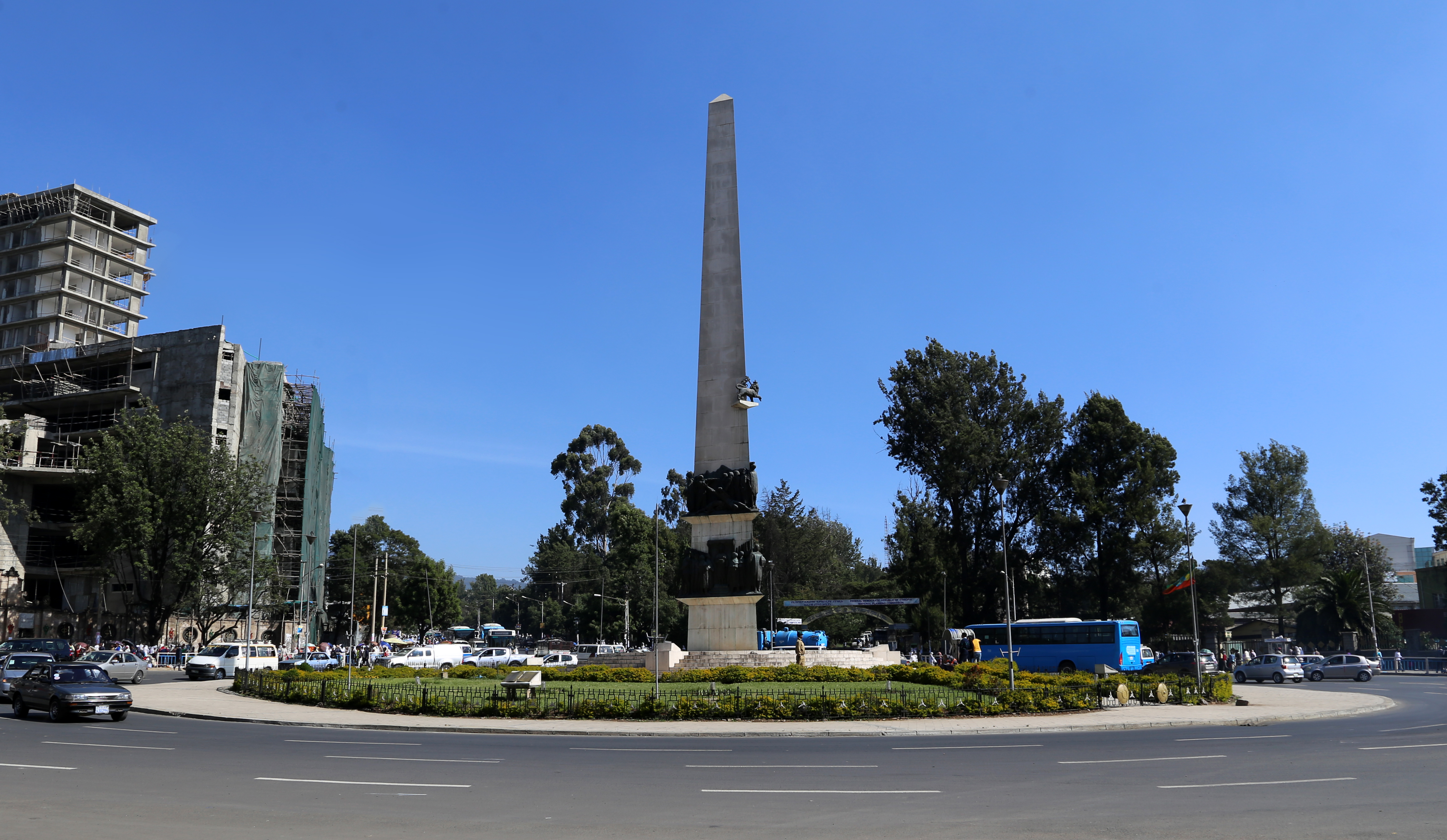
Antun Augustinčić and Frano Kršinić, Monument to Victims of Italian Fascism in Ethiopia, Addis Ababa, Ethiopia,1955

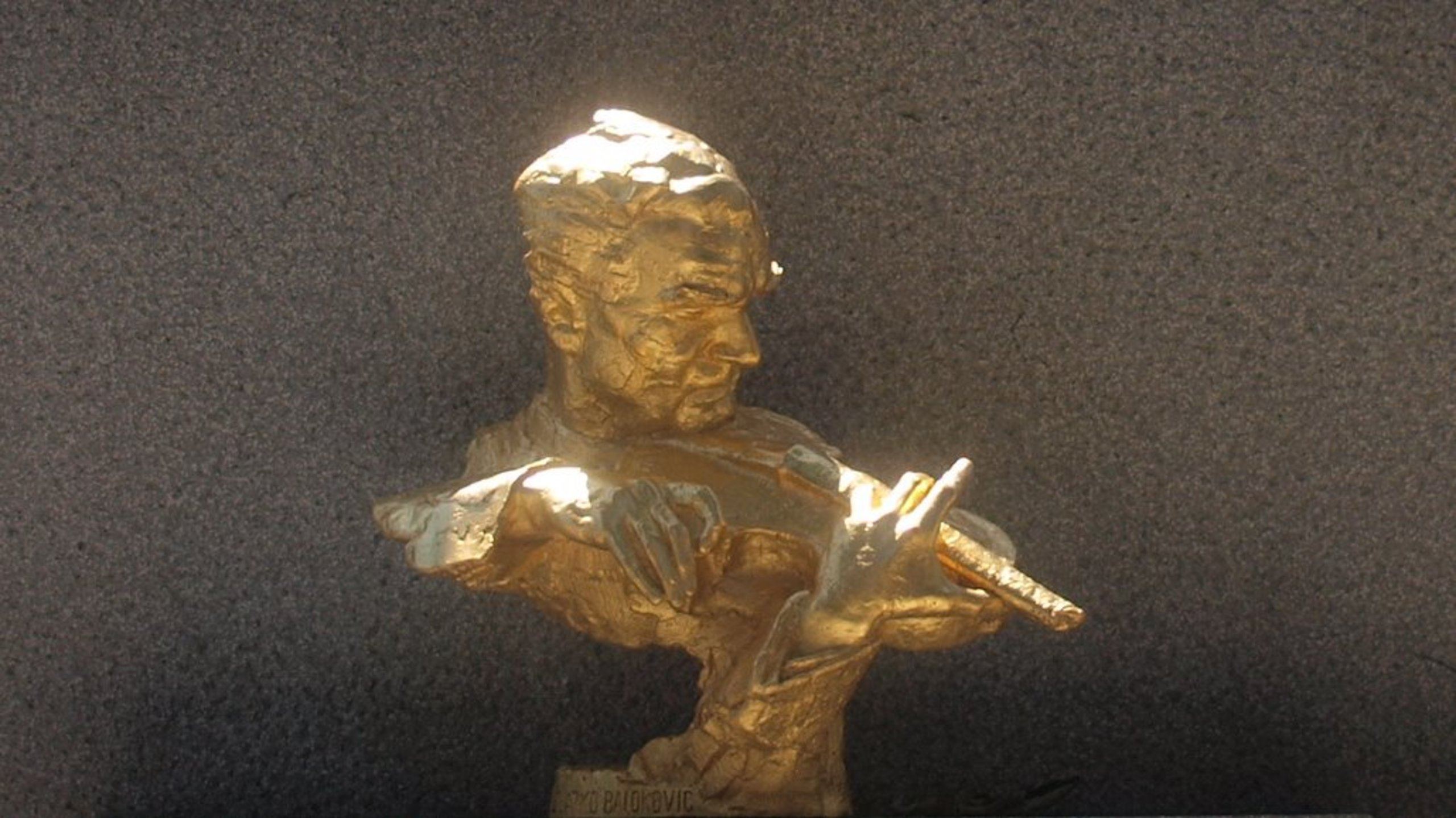
Bust of Zlatko Baloković at Mirogoj Cemetery in Zagreb, 1967

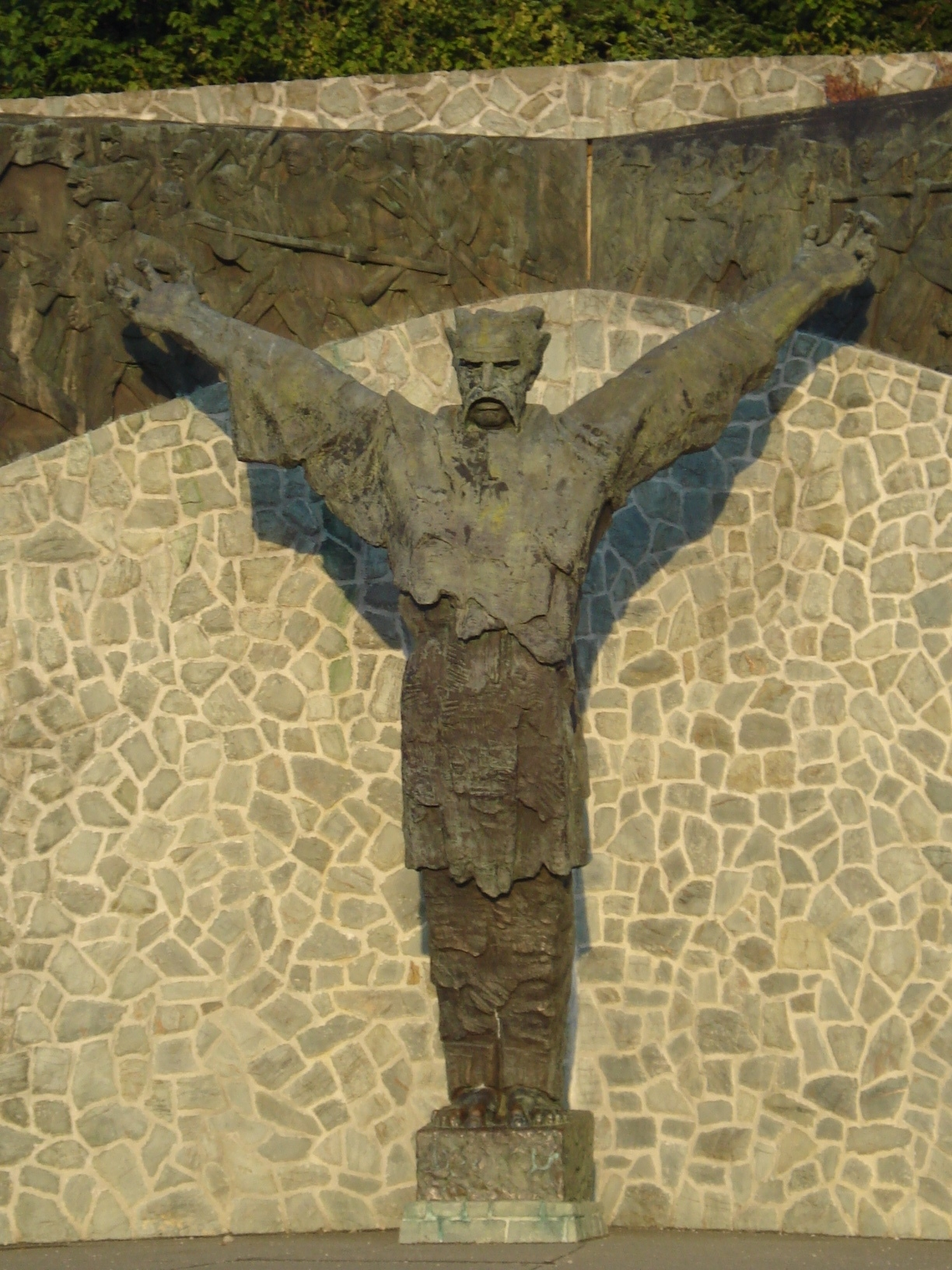
Monument to the Peasants' Rebellion and Matija Gubec in Donja Stubica, 1973
