= Edo Murtić =

Croatian painter

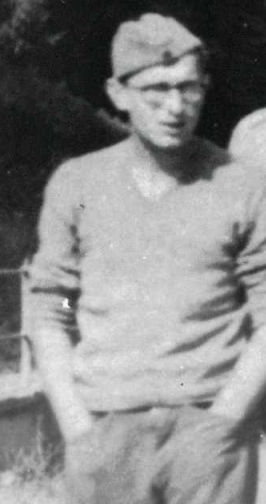
- Murtić in 1944
- Born: Edo Murtić; 4 May 1921; Velika Pisanica, Kingdom of Serbs, Croats and Slovenes
- Died: 2 January 2005 (aged 83); Zagreb, Croatia
- Education: Academy of Fine Arts, Zagreb
- Known for: Painting, Graphical art, Mosaic, Theatrical sets
- Notable work: "Manhattan", "Fires", "Eyes of Fear", "Montraker" cycle, War cycle
- Movement: Lyrical Abstraction, Art Informel, Tachisme

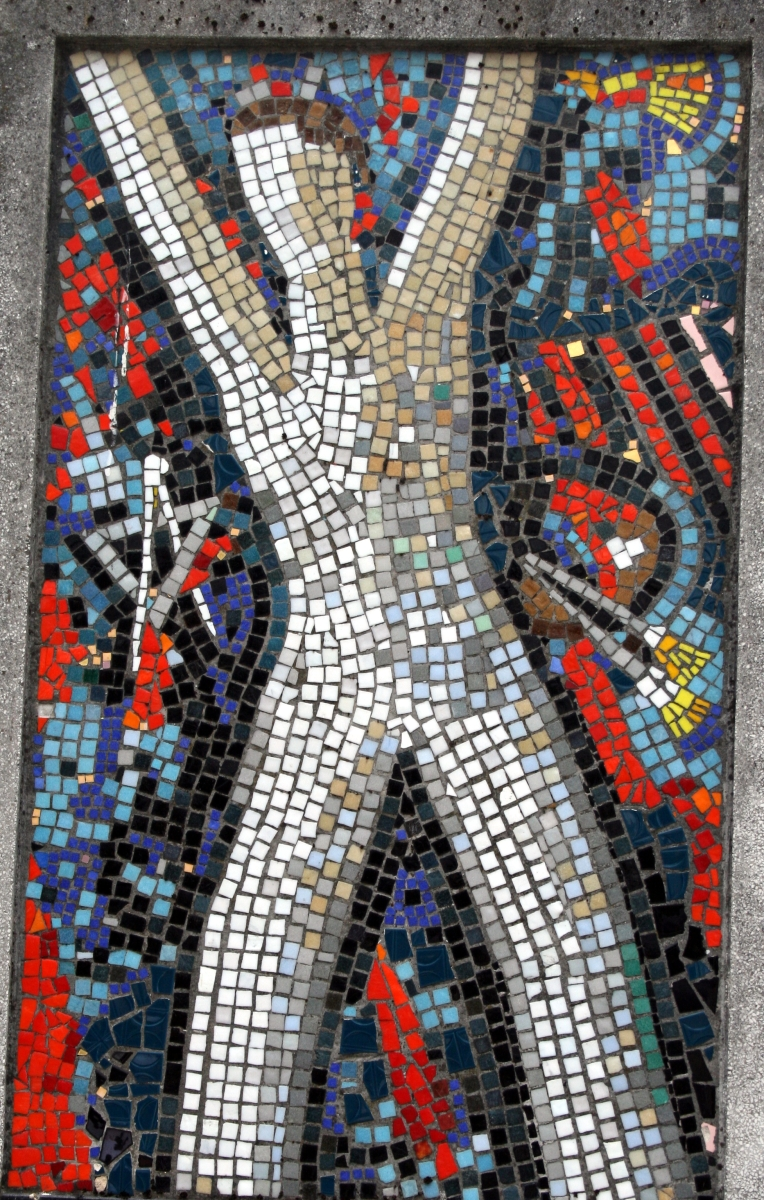
Mosaic by Edo Murtić on the Šeferov family tomb at the Mirogoj Cemetery

Edo Murtić (4 May 1921 – 2 January 2005) was a Croatian painter, best known for his lyrical abstraction and abstract expressionism style. He worked in a variety of media, including oil painting, gouache, graphic design, ceramics, mosaics, murals and theatrical set design. Murtić travelled and exhibited extensively in Europe and North America, gaining international recognition for his work, which can be found in museums, galleries and private collections worldwide. He was one of the founders of the group "March" (Mart) in 1956, and received many international awards. In 1958 Murtić participated in the three biggest events in the world of contemporary art: the Venice Biennale, the Carnegie Prize in Pittsburgh, and Documenta in Kassel. Interest in the art of Edo Murtić continues to grow, with retrospective exhibits in major museums.

Murtić was a member of the Croatian Academy of Sciences and Arts, and a member of the Croatian Helsinki Committee for Human Rights.

== Biography ==
Murtić was born on 4 May 1921 in Velika Pisanica near Bjelovar, Croatia (then in Kingdom of Serbs, Croats and Slovenes). He was the second child of Vinko and Franciska Murtić. Early in his childhood, the family moved to Zagreb where Murtić received his education. He attended Craft School 1935–39, studying under Edo Kovačević, Kamilo Tompa and Ernest Tomašević. His first exhibition was held in 1935 at the Royal High School in Zagreb.

In 1939, Murtić enrolled in the Academy of Fine Arts in Zagreb under Ljubo Babić and Krsto Hegedušić. During 1940 he attended classes given by Petar Dobrović in Belgrade returning to Zagreb in 1941 to complete his studies at the academy.

Murtić was strongly influenced by socialist ideas, and at the outbreak of the Second World War he became involved in the anti-fascist movement. In the spring of 1944, Murtić joined the liberation forces, where he worked designing graphics, posters, and books. In the years following the war, Murtić began to travel and exhibit extensively. In 1951 he spent time in the U.S. and Canada, where he encountered the abstract expressionism movement. Back in Zagreb he was one of the founders of the group "March" (Mart) in 1956.

In 1958 Murtić participated in the three biggest events in the world of contemporary art: the Venice Biennale, the Carnegie Prize in Pittsburgh, and Documenta in Kassel.

Murtić's wife was Goranka Vrus Murtić, a well-known artist in her own right. Together they bought and renovated an old stone house in the town of Vrsar, on the Istrian coast. Although their main residence was in Zagreb, they spent much of each year in Vrsar. Of his summer house and studio, Murtić said "It is really nice here, I enjoy the silence and concentration that is irreplaceable... I do not know if I would find a more beautiful place anywhere in the world." The landscape there inspired many of his paintings, especially the "Montraker" cycle, which is named for the nearby Ancient Roman stone quarry.

Edo Murtić was a member of the Yugoslav Academy of Sciences and Arts (now the Croatian Academy of Sciences and Arts) and the Croatian Helsinki Committee for Human Rights. He was named an honorary citizen of the town of Bjelovar.

Edo Murtić died in Zagreb on 2 January 2005, aged 83.

== Legacy ==
Edo Murtić was a prominent representative of abstract painting. Primarily known for painting in oil, and gouache, he also produced a variety of other works such as graphic design, ceramics, mosaics, murals, and theatrical set design.

Murtic's early work was mainly realistic paintings of interiors, portraits and still lifes, and graphical illustrations.

Following the Second World War, a new direction in art was taking place in North America, particularly New York where Abstract Expressionism became a personal expression of the artists' feelings and experiences. At the same time in Paris, Lyrical Abstraction was establishing a new identity. During the 1950s, Murtić experienced both art scenes at first hand. In America he encountered artists such as Willem de Kooning and Jackson Pollock, and in Europe he saw the work of Jean René Bazaine, Alfred Manessier, and Gustave Singier. Murtić's own paintings of this time show the influence of these ideas as he developed his own personal style.

Towards the early 1960s, there were signs of Tachisme and Art Informel in his work. His paintings on dark ground were almost monochrome, while those on a light ground showed a rhythmical movement of a dark mass across it. This distinctive theme became his trademark style, with increasingly dynamic strokes with intense, energetic colour.

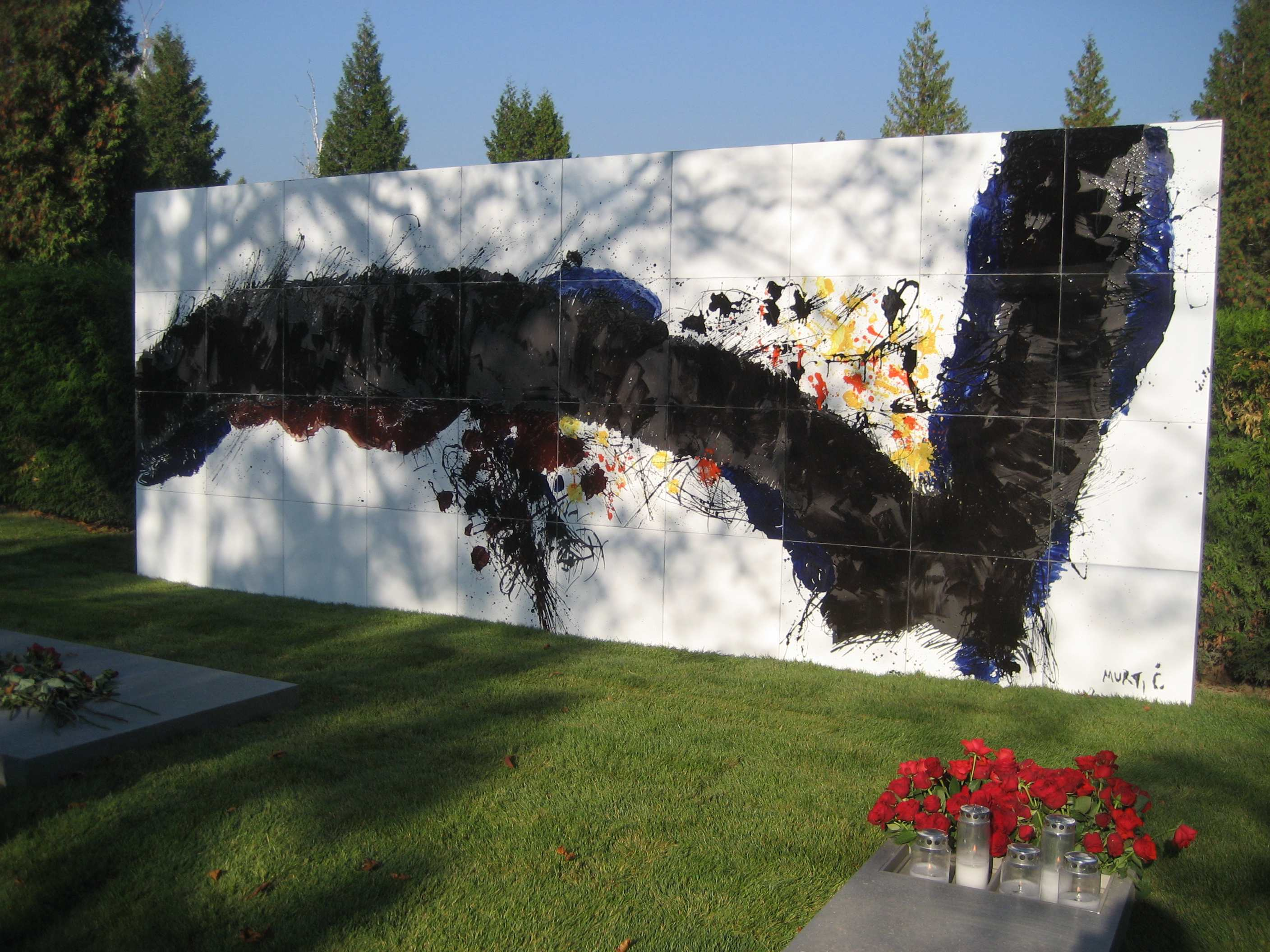
Edo Murtić artwork at the Mirogoj Cemetery

During the 1970s, Murtić's works began appearing in public areas, such as in the Mirogoj Cemetery in Zagreb, the Memorial in the Čazma Ossuary, the Vatroslav Lisinski Concert Hall, and the Zagrepčanka office building (1975).

By the 1980s, Murtić was internationally recognized as one of the leading abstract painters from the socialist world. In the summer of 1981 he spent months sailing around the southern Adriatic coast. From that experience came his "Fires" (Požari) cycle, a masterful interpretation of the landscape using strong gesture and expressive colour.

The "Eyes of Fear" cycle (1981-4) was stimulated by a new edition of "Jama", a poem by Ivan Goran Kovačić on the horrors of war. Once again committing himself to create the illustrations, Murtić immersed himself in the topic of war, violence, pain and fear. He uses the symbolism of two dark figures from mythology - the Minotaur and the Raven, who are depicted at various times as horse, bull and villain. A threatening atmosphere is created by these figures combined with a stark red and black colour scheme and the tension of his drawing.

The "Montraker" cycle (1992–95) was inspired by the Ancient Roman stone quarry near Vrsar, which became an important motif for Murtić. He was inspired not just by the landscape itself, but its history of being shaped by the hand of man. He portrayed the rocks and the surrounding views with the lights and shadows of different times of day, through the seasons and changing weather, giving a sense of the passage of time both in the landscape, and in himself.

Even in his most abstract work, Murtić remained connected with nature. The shapes of the landscape are expressed by gesture or selection of colour. The line of the hill, rock, or tree are portrayed without reference to volume, and his palette was based on the colours and lights of the surrounding landscape. Edo Murtić himself said of his paintings that he "drew these colours out of the Istrian landscape" and that it would be possible to talk of "some essence of colour".

In January 2010, an exhibit of Edo Murtić's "War" (Rat) opened at the Art Pavilion in Zagreb. Over 350 of his drawings, gouaches and collages on the subject of death, suffering, horror, and war were on display, presenting a strong humanist and anti-war message. At the opening reception, guests included the President of the Republic of Croatia Ivo Josipović, Prime Minister Jadranka Kosor, Deputy Prime Minister Đurđa Adlešič, Minister of Culture Božo Biškupić, fellow artists, architects, musicians, directors and many others. In his opening remarks, Božo Biškupić called Murtić "one of the greatest Croatian artists of the second half of the 20th century" and one who "pointed the way to the beginning of a new century". The Director of the Art Pavilion, Radovan Vuković described the exhibit as an "exceptional cultural and artistic event", and referring to the large crowd at the opening said "This confirms that Edo Murtić is not just a name, a symbol of Croatian culture and art of the 20th century, but that five years after his death still excites incredible interest".

The Murtić Foundation (Fundacija Murtić) has been established to ensure that his art will continue to be available for future generations. "The Foundation will contribute to building our national identity" said Ivo Josipović, the Croatian President, "It deserves a museum because his work is great and very important, and the next generation will certainly want to see it.

Edo Murtić donated over 1,500 of his works to the City of Zagreb, including paintings, sculptures, mosaics, drawings, ceramics and enamels. An exhibit of 300 selected works "From the Murtić Donation" opened in the Museum of Contemporary Art, Zagreb in October 2010. As part of the opening celebrations, the street on the east side of the museum was officially named in his honour.

== Works ==
- Illustrations for "Red Horse" (Crveni konj) by Jure Kaštelan 1940
- Lithographs for "The Pit" (Jama) by Ivan Goran Kovačić. 1944
- Cycle "American Experience" (Dozivlja Amerike) including "Manhattan" (1950), "New York" (1950)
- "Autumn" Jesen (1962.)
- "Blue screen" Plava podloga (1964.)
- "Black Triangle" Crni trokut (1968)
- Memorial in Čazma ossuary, 1970s
- Tapestries at the Vatroslav Lisinski Concert Hall 1970s
- Mosaic in the Zagrepčanka building (1975)
- Cycle: "Entrance to the Garden"( Ulaz u vrt) 1970s
- Cycle: "Great scenery" (Veliki krajolik). 1970s
- "Testament for Epetion" (Zavjet za Epetion) 1984
- Cycle: "Eyes of Fear" (1981–1984)
- Cycle: "Fires" (Požari ) 1985-1990 includes works such as "vineyard" (Vinograd ), "Cypresses" Čempresi (1986.), "Landscape with three suns" Krajolik s tri sunca (1989.), "Mediterranean Garden" Mediteranski vrt (1990).
- Cycle: "Rat" (War) 1990s

== Exhibitions ==
During his lifetime, Murtić held over 150 solo exhibitions and participated in around 300 group exhibitions on all continents. A selection of the more recent and/or major exhibitions are listed here.

=== Solo ===
- 2010 "From the Murtić Donation" - Museum of Contemporary Art, Zagreb
- 2010 "War" - Art Pavilion in Zagreb
- 2009 Art pavilion Juraj Matija Sporer, Opatija
- 2005 Art Pavilion in Zagreb
- 2004 Kroatische Malerei des 20. Jahrhunderts - Kunsthistorisches Museum Wien, Vienna
- 2003 Retrospective Exhibition Modern Gallery, Zagreb
- 2003 Lissone near Milan; Palace Harrach in Vienna
- 2002 Edo Murtić: Paintings 2001-2001 and Ceramics 2001 - Glyptotheque - Sculpture Museum, Zagreb; Edo Murtić: Novi Manjež Gallery in Moscow
- 2000 Museo Revoltella, Trieste
- 1998 Museum of Modern Art Dubrovnik, Dubrovnik
- 1998 "Montraker" - Art Pavilion in Zagreb
- 1966 Gallery of Fine Arts, Split (Galerija Umjetnina), Split

=== Group ===
- 2009 Da Hartung a Warhol. Presenze internazionali nella collezione Cozzani. Opere dalle raccolte del CAMeC - CAMeC - Centro de Arte Moderna e Contemporanea della Spezia, La Spezia.
- 2008 From the holdings of the museum - Museum of Modern Art Dubrovnik, Dubrovnik
- 2007 Avangardne tendencije u Hrvatskoj - Galerija Klovićevi dvori, Zagreb
- 2007 Sammlung Politeo - Art Center Berlin Friedrichstrasse, Berlin
- 2006 Croatian Collection - Museum of Contemporary Art Skopje, Skopje
- 2004 AVANGUARDIE STORICHE E ASTRAZIONE - Importanti opere su carta del XX secolo - Galleria Torbandena, Trieste
- 2003 New Year Art Fair - Galerija Zona, Zagreb
- 1999 23rd International Biennial of Graphic Arts - Ljubljana Biennial of Graphic Arts, Ljubljana
- 1999 Grands et Jeunes d`Aujourd Hui 1958-1998 - Museum of Modern Art Dubrovnik, Dubrovnik
- 1989 18th International Biennial of Graphic Arts - Ljubljana
- 1958 Venice Bienniale

=== Galleries/Dealers ===
- Croatia: Galerija Kaptol, Zagreb
- Germany: 418 Gallery, Munich
- Italy: Galleria Torbandena, Trieste
- Romania: 418 Gallery, Cetate

=== Public Collections ===
- Croatia: City of Zagreb
- Croatia: Museum of Modern Art Dubrovnik, Dubrovnik
- Croatia: Gallery of Fine Arts / Galerija likovnih umjetnosti, Osijek, Osijek
- Croatia: MMSU - Museum of Modern and Contemporary Art Rijeka, Rijeka
- Croatia: Rovinj Heritage Museum, Rovinj
- Croatia: Galerija Umjetnina Split, Split
- Croatia: Museum of Contemporary Art, Zagreb MSU (Muzej Suvremene Umjetnosti )
- Italy: CAMeC - Centro de Arte Moderna e Contemporanea della Spezia, La Spezia
- Macedonia (F.Y.R.M.): Museum of Contemporary Art Skopje, Skopje
- Serbia: Poklon zbirka Rajka Mamuzića, Novi Sad
- Slovenia: Galerija Murska Sobota, Murska Sobota
- Slovenia: Mednarodni grafični likovni center, Ljubljana
- United Kingdom: Tate Gallery, London
- USA: MoMA - Museum of Modern Art, New York City, NY
