= Kruno Prijatelj =

Croatian art historian

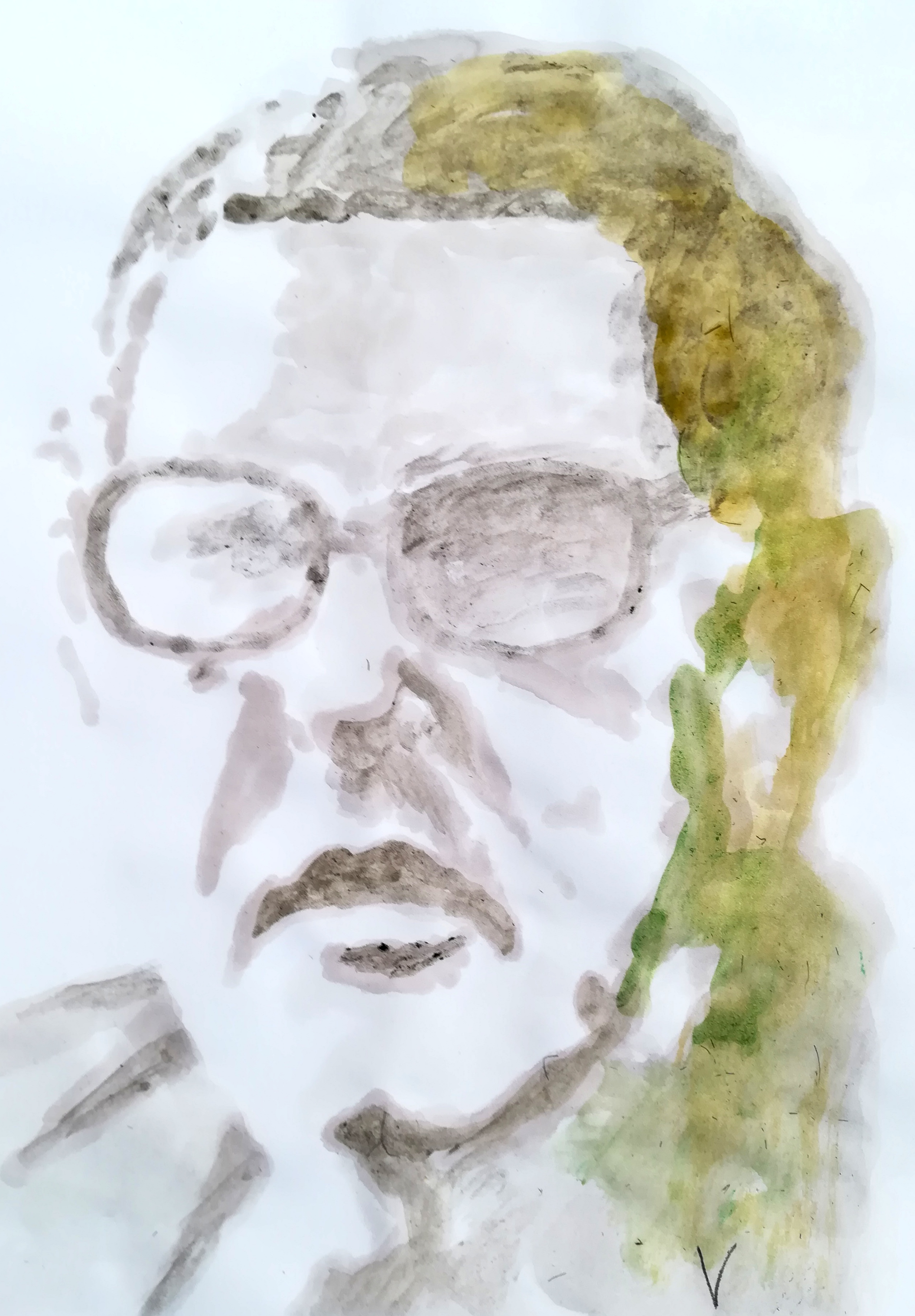
- Portrait of Kruno Prijatelj
- Born: 1922; Split
- Died: 1998 (aged 75–76); Split
- Known for: discovery of Biagio di Giorgio da Traù
- Scientific career
- Fields: Art history
- Institutions: University of Zagreb, University of Zadar

Kruno Prijatelj (1922–1998), was a Croatian art historian, art critic and University professor.

He introduced many artists who contributed to art in Dalmatia. Prijatelj's efforts answered many unsolved topics in Dalmatian art history.

His interest on Baroque in Dalmatia, led him to be called Prijatelj od Baroka (Friend of the Baroque).

== Early life ==
Prijatelj was born in Split, Croatia. He grew up during the Second World War. He studied art history in Zagreb and Rome. Eventually he graduated from the University of Zagreb in 1946. The following year he received his Ph.D. in Zagreb. His thesis was on the Baroque period in Split.

Between 1950 - 1979, he worked as the director in Gallery of Fine Arts in Split. These were his most fertile years. Prijatelj was the most important Croatian scholar of his generation in Dalmatian art history, particularly in the Baroque period.

He wrote about the figures of Dalmatian art, and rediscovered lesser-known artists such as Matteo Ponzone. He attributed several works to Biagio di Giorgio da Traù, an itinerant Italian painter with scattered works between Zadar, Trogir, Split, Dubrovnik, Ston and Čiovo.

Beginning in 1972, he taught contemporary art history at the Faculty of Philosophy in Zagreb, as adjunct professor. From 1979, he taught art history at the University of Zadar until his retirement in 1991. Since 1968, he was a regular member of Yugoslav Academy of Sciences and Arts.

He died in Split in 1998.

== Selected works ==
His works include:

- Barok u Splitu, Split 1947
- Ivan Duknović, (1957.)
- Studije o umjetninama u Dalmaciji I, Zagreb 1963
- Klasicistički slikari Dalmacije, Split 1964
- Le opere di Matteo Ponzone in Dalmazia , in Arte Veneta, XX, 1966, pp. 153–154.
- Slikar Blaž Jurjev, 1965
- Studije o umjetninama u Dalmaciji II, Zagreb 1968
- Studije o umjetninama u Dalmaciji III, Zagreb 1975
- Studije o umjetninama u Dalmaciji IV, Zagreb 1983
- Dalmatinsko slikarstvo 15. i 16. stoljeća, Zagreb 1983
- Antun Motika (1902.-1992.), Zagreb 1992
- Kroz povijest umjetnosti u Dalmaciji (XIII-XIX. st.), Split 1995
