= Slavko Kopač =

French painter, ceramist and sculptor

Slavko Kopač (August 21, 1913 – November 23, 1995) was a Croatian painter, sculptor and poet.

Kopač graduated from the Academy of Fine Arts in Zagreb in 1937. After graduation, as a young artist, he studied in Paris thanks to a scholarship from the French government. He continued his education in Florence where he studied philosophy and the history of Art from 1943 to 1948. In that period he started to liberate himself from acquired knowledge and rejected academicism, entering the circle of some of the prominent artists of the 20th century. In 1948, he has settled permanently in Paris, where together with Jean Dubuffet, André Breton and Michel Tapié he founded the Compagnie de l'Art Brut and was the leader and creator of the Art brut collection for 30 years. He worked closely with André Breton, who organized exhibitions for his work at his gallery À l'Étoile scellée. Michel Tapié included him in his book Un Art Autre, in which Kopač stands as one of the founders of Art informel together with Jean Dubuffet, Jean Fautrier, Paul Jackson Pollock and many others.

He exhibited in Zagreb, Florence, Rome and Paris.

== School and academy ==
Slavko Kopač was born on August 21, 1913, in Vinkovci, Austria-Hungary (now Croatia), where he graduated from elementary and high school. He received his first painting lessons from a high school drawing teacher, Vinko Pajalić.

In October 1933 Kopač became a student of the Royal Academy of Arts in Zagreb in the class of Vladimir Becić, where he completed his studies in 1937. At the academy, as a 20-year-old, he met Zoran Mušič and Mladen Veža with whom he would be friends for many years, both in Zagreb and later in Paris. During the academy days Kopač started dreaming of Paris, thanks to his professor Vladimir Becić who described Paris as "capital of light and painting".

In 1938, Kopač exhibited seventeen works at the Ullrich Salon, especially oils and watercolors, many of which were sold. The exhibition had a favorable reception, and was described as by "the youngest painters of the Zagreb School from the inexhaustible workshop of their role model and teacher Vladimir Becic". Kopač exhibited in his home town Vinkovci. Together with Mladen Veža, he was invited to exhibit in the new Meštrović Pavilion at the exhibition of modern Croatian art titled Half a Century of Croatian Art, prepared by the Croatian Society of Arts for its 60th anniversary. The exhibition brought together the best Croatian painters, sculptors and architects, among whom Kopač, though the youngest, was represented by three paintings. Thanks to these successes, Kopač was awarded a scholarship from the French government for study in Paris.

== Nine months in Paris ==
At the end of 1939, Kopač went to Paris, where he was welcomed by Leo Junek, who had arrived in Paris in 1925. Kopač described his first stay to Mirko Galić: "For me, Paris was a city of dreams. I used to say: if I could not do otherwise, I would walk to Paris; I was so attracted. When I finally arrived, it was November 30, 1939." As the war approached France, people were fleeing massively before the onslaught of Nazism and the German army, and Kopač and Junek spent days walking around the empty city.

During this first stay in Paris, the need to abandon academic knowledge and rules in his artistic expression was born:

I was very fortunate to find someone like Junek who showed me what was valuable. And I have my own views on painting. I reckon I wasn't even 15 when I got hold of a book which considerably determined me: that was a book about the great Austrian painter, Schiele. For me, he remains equally interesting and smart today, as he was at the time when I discovered him. But I never copied, not him or anyone else."

The planned one-year stay in Paris was shortened to nine months: in September he returned to his homeland, where he was sent to the grammar school in Mostar to become a drawing teacher.

== Teaching ==
Kopač left Mostar and in 1941 to 1942 taught at the Second Classical Gymnasium in Zagreb. The works created during his stay in Paris and Mostar were exhibited at the First and Second Exhibitions of Croatian Artists, while the Zagreb-based paintings Jesuit Monastery and The Abandoned Station were listed in the Croatian selection for the 23rd Venice Biennale in 1942.

== Florence ==
In February 1943, Kopač went on a study trip to Italy and settled in Florence, where he stayed until 1948. During this period he studied philosophy at the University of Florence. From 1945 to 1948 he had nine exhibitions, which achieved great success among Italian critical and artistic circles. The rector of Accademia di Belle Arti di Firenze wrote about his particular originality. The works from the Italian period are mostly watercolors and gouaches which Biserka Rauter Plančić in her book described them as "Kopač's exciting visions of harmless conflicts or encounters of animals and humans with the poetic environment of the forest world." Vladimir Maleković described the watercolors as "works of great poetic expression."

The time he spent in Italy determined Kopač's future creation:

That purification of mine, if it could be called that, began in Italy. During the war, I was there, there was a group of people, artists, painters, smart people who studied big and high science and that was the core of these great, great reflections and debates. We were in the shadow of the baptistery, in front of the cathedral, meeting every day, and those were the hours of conversation. That started there, my liberation.

== Life in Paris ==
At the end of 1948 Kopač left Italy for Paris, where he would settle for good. Just a few days after his arrival in Paris, he met the artist Jean Dubuffet; and after seeing that they had the same approach to art, they began a long collaboration in publication and the establishment of Dubuffet's Art brut. Together they were "collecting works for the Art brut Collection of which Kopac, at Dubuffet's explicit request, was taking care of as a conservationist and curator for 35 years, until October 1975 when the collection was relocated to Lausanne." Along with his duties related to the Art brut collection, Kopač continued his artistic work, and his expression remained authentic. Although some critics compared him with Dubuffet. Kopač explained:

I don't like to be compared to anyone, not even to Dubuffet, to whom I'm attached the most. We are two men who like the same thing. I don't know whether it was fortunate or unfortunate, but we met on the same path. What we created was close. I was in an unfavorable position, as Dubuffet started ruling the world. What could I, a man from the suburbs of Europe, do? Either to move away or to bow to him. All right, I didn't move away, but I didn't bow to him either. Why would I? My famous cow was created before Dubuffet's cows.

Igor Zidić described the relationship of the two artists:

His art has points of contact with the work of Jean Dubuffet, but we would make a mistake if we would, by being deceived with Dubuffet's greater fame, conclude that Dubuffet was a teacher and Kopac his follower. Kopac is a poet of weaker general, but of greater specific, lyrical strength; he's more humorous than Dubuffet and less cynical. The art of Dubuffet is brutally critical: it advances us with a slap. Kopac expresses critique with nostalgia: he praises flora and fauna as a symbolic, primordial frame of the innocent world. He connects himself with the verge of a mythical, worldly youth. Between paradise and compote he decides on paradise, so he is good when he is hungry. Kopac's humour is irresistible and serious: the great wildlife colonizer placed his human brothers in all the free, unoccupied plants and animals."

In a 1981 letter, Dubuffet himself described his first encounter with Kopač and his art:

Kopac and I met when he arrived in Paris, over thirty years ago. His art was already formed then in the way it has remained; his positions, already firmly established, were no longer subject to change. He did not know anything about my paintings, which followed a similar design, just as I knew nothing about his. Our mutual aspirations have brought us together; they started our close friendship. I am very fond of his works; they fill me with a live emotion and admiration.

In 1949 Kopač illustrated André Breton's poem Au regard des divinités (In relation to the deities), meeting Breton at a time when Dubuffet was going to Africa to study Arabic art, and they were collaborating on the Art Brut collection. Kopač described their cooperation:

Dubuffet then went to El Golea, to paint and look at that Arab world. During that period, Breton, who was in the first Art Brut committee, who collaborated with Paulhan and others, replaced Dubuffet and came every day in the afternoon to those premises and so we together looked at what needed to be done, what we needed to reply to and, within about one month, it all started. Breton didn't know me then at all, to what extent I was a painter, I don't know, I was always saved again in life by maybe so-called charm; everybody always said it and maybe my whole behaviour, because I'm a man without, they would say in Vinkovci, fussiness, which means direct, so it somehow started and I had my first exhibition in 1949 and that was a big event. I then made with Breton that plaque which was one of his most favourite among all the others ever published. And he wrote there, I made a of sketch how he should organise it and we made it together and together signed it and, for me, it is a bright spot. I'm talking about a man who was exceptionally dear to me, one of the rare gentlemen I've ever met in my life.

He stated:

Surrealism has never captured me. Me and Breton had some meeting points, but also many differences. I didn't fit in with Breton's surrealistic gospel.

Kopač nevertheless collaborated with the surrealists and hung out with the others alongside Breton, Michaux, Paulhan, and Tanguy: "I socialised with them and what's nice is that they never intended or wanted to find in me a surrealist painter; they accepted what I brought."

In November he organized his first solo exhibition in Paris, at the Galerie Messages. He described his first years in Paris:

I couldn't come to Paris like some of our painters and go to the Seine with a palette the next day and paint. I carry paintings within me for a long time, for months, as a woman carries her child in her stomach, or for years, as an elephant. I can't just copy what I see. I'm not interested in God's tree; I think about a tree that I will build. It is different, perhaps less beautiful, but it is my tree.

In 1950, Kopač took part in illustrating André Breton's book "Almanach Surréaliste du demi-siècle" together with Breton and other surrealists.

In 1951, he published an illustrated booklet Le Soleil se Couche au Pays des Éléphants (english translation: The Sun Sets in the Land of Elephants), printed on 6 thin wooden plates. He was also writing poetry and illustrating. He was in a constant need to push the boundaries and find new ways to express his art. It was a strong desire that moved him in new directions:

I was running away from painting because I wanted to get rid of certain traps that stood in my way. It was necessary to find something that would at the same time be an adventure of the hands, not just an adventure of the spirit. By changing the material with which you have become skilled and which you know too well and by setting new obstacles on the way, you become like a fisherman who sees new reasons, new motives and paths in these stains, rough layers of clay.

In 1952, the gallerist Michel Tapié classified Kopač as the founder of a new direction in art, which he called art informel (informal art). Kopač's art was presented in Paul Facchetti's studio and in a joint exhibition of a circle of artists who did not make a direction but spontaneously initiated a movement that Kopač's and Tapié's friend Michel Ragon called the Second Figuration.

In 1953, Kopač exhibited his paintings, sculptures and ceramics in Breton's gallery À l'étoile scellée. In May, Kopač also got married and thereafter lived with his wife in Montmartre until his death. A year later, his only son Laurent was born.

In 1957 Kopač met gallerist Alphonse Chave in Vence on the Côte d'Azur, a friend of Jean Dubuffet. In the same year, Chave organized an exhibition of Kopač's paintings in his gallery Galerie Chave which consisted of 78 works.

In 1961, Kopač exhibited a large number of paintings, drawings and sculptures in Galerie Mona Lisa (in Paris). Michel Ragon and Philippe Dereux wrote essays for the exhibition catalog, expressing their admiration for Kopač's art.

During the spring of 1963, Kopač exhibited at the Mona Lisa Gallery for the second time. On its occasion, Radovan Ivšić wrote:

Every knot in a tree can be a windmill, a starfish or an eye. An eye restless or smiling? A shadow or a reflection of anthracite? ... And if he found a bomb on his wanderings, I would bet he would raise it to make an egg out of it, a spring egg.

Kopač initiated and helped organize Dubuffet's exhibition in Zagreb, which was held in 1964 at the Gallery of Contemporary Art.

In late 1968, Kopač went to the United States to open his first overseas exhibition, in Louisville, Kentucky.

Together with Dubuffet, in 1975 and 1976 Kopač organized the transport of the Art Brut collection to Switzerland, where the collection would be stored and presented to the public. They become Directors of the collection and from then on went to the board meetings once a year.

In 1981 Kopač had an important solo exhibition in Paris. The Paris Art Center dedicated a retrospective exhibition to him, covering works created from 1936 to 1981.

Thanks to the friendly and lively connections between the Parisian and American surrealists, in 1982 Kopač had the opportunity to exhibit in Chicago and Houston, and on the occasion of the opening of the exhibition he traveled to the USA.

In 1985, the Alphonse Chave Gallery organized an exhibition in tribute to Dubuffet. On that occasion, the two artists met at a joint exhibition of their works. Dubuffet's stories about his friend, collaborator and colleague Kopač appeared in the exhibition catalog:

Just like my own works, the ones of Kopac turn their backs on institutional art. He denies himself borrowing anything from the cultural intellectualism. He is fully decided on the burning wild spirituality. He is only in pursuit of innocence, of pure invention. His art is, therefore, extremely controlled and refined. It is a very precise barbaric refinement which, starting from the simplest of evocations, the poorest and, by implementing only the most rudimentary means, achieves in its expression an intensity which academic productions no longer know.

Writer Annie Le Brun, with whom Kopač had collaborated for many years, organized a larger exhibition of his recent works at the Galerie l'art international in late 1986 and beginning of 1987.

In 1992, Chave organized Kopač's sixth solo exhibition in his gallery.

His last public appearance was at the 13th biennial of Slavonians in which his work occupies a prominent place. The last two years of his life were marked by a fight against severe disease.

Kopač died in Paris on November 23, 1995. He was buried in Montmartre Cemetery on December 1, and a memorial service was held at Notre-Dame de Clignancourt. He was commemorated at the Zagreb House of Croatian Fine Artists on December 13 and at the Amphithéâtre Guizot in the Sorbonne, Paris on January 19, 1996.

== Main exhibitions ==
Pola vijeka hrvatske umjetnosti, skupna izložba, dom likovnih umjetnosti (in Croatian) Half a century of Croatian art, group exhibition, Home of fine arts, Zagreb; 18.XII. 1938 - 31.I. 1938

XXIII. Biennale Internationale d'Arte, Venice; VI-IX. 1942

Pittore Jugoslavo Slavko Kopac, Galleria d'arte Michelangelo (in Italian), Florence, 6-17.I. 1945

Fiore de Henriquez - Slavko Kopac, Galleria Rizzi (in Italian), Florence, 15-28. II. 1947

Kopac, Galleria Chiurazzi, Rome, III. 1948

Slavko Kopac, Galerie messages, Paris, 8.XI - 8. XII. 1949

Slavko Kopac - tableaux, céramiques et sculptures, Galerie À l'Étoile scellée (in French), Paris, 14.IV - 2.V. 1953

Slavko Kopac - peintures et céramiques, Galerie Alphonse Chave (in French), Vence, 10-31.VIII. 1957

Slavko Kopac - peintures, sculptures et aquarelles, Galerie Mona Lisa (in French), Paris 1.VI - 15.VII. 1961

Slavko Kopac - Galerie Mona Lisa, Paris, 8. V - 8.VI. 1963

Kopac - peintures, gouaches, pierres, Galerie Alphonse Chave (in French), Vence 27.VIII -30.IX. 1964

Clin d'oeil à une galerie de Provence, Galerie l'Oeil é coute (in French), Lyon, 7.XI -3.XII. 1964

Slavko Kopač - slike, skulpture, keramika, retrospektiva 1935 - 1976, Moderna galerija (in Croatian), paintings, sculptures, ceramics, retrospect 1935 - 1976, Modern Gallery, Zagreb 1977

Slavko Kopac, Rétrospective 1936 -1981, Paris Art Centre, Paris, XI. 1981

L'Oeuvre récente, F.A.M.E. Gallery, Houston, 10.X - 25.XI. 1982

FIAC, Galerie Marwan Hoss, Paris 1987

Kopač, Galerija likovnih umjetnosti, Osijek, 7-21.XII. 1989

Slavko Kopac, Galerie Alphonse Chave, Vence, 27.VI -20.VIII. 1992

XIII. biennale Slavonaca, skupna izložba, Galerija likovnih umjetnosti (in Croatian), XIII. biennial of Slavonians, group exhibition, Art gallery, Osijek, XII. 1992 - I. 1993.

== Posthumous exhibition ==
Organized by the Association pour la promotion des arts (Paris), led by its president Xavière Tiberi, a retrospective exhibition of Kopač's works was opened on 18 April 1996 in the Salle Saint-Jean of the Paris Hôtel de Ville. On the occasion, 200 of Kopač's works were presented, and the exhibition was accompanied by a richly illustrated catalog, in which essays on Kopač's art were written by Annie Le Brun and Emmanuel Daydé. At the opening of the exhibition, Tiberi pointed out that Kopač, a painter and poet at the same time, was a Croat by birth and a Parisian by love. He made a strong friendship with Paris, which lasted 47 years. Paris was therefore obliged to dedicate to this unique artist a "retrospective exhibition as befits his work".
