= Edo Kovačević =

- Born: 16 November 1906; Gospić, Austria-Hungary, today's Croatia
- Died: 15 March 1993 (aged 86); Zagreb, Croatia
- Education: Zagreb, Paris
- Known for: landscape art, set design
- Notable work: Zagreb Roofs series

Edo Kovačević (16 November 1906 – 15 March 1993) was a Croatian artist, best known for his colourful landscapes and views of suburban Zagreb. He worked mainly in oils and pastels, using subtle colour harmonies and lively brush strokes to bring out the natural beauty of ordinary subjects. Kovačević also designed theatrical stage sets for the Croatian National Theatre, the Drama Theatre and the Puppet Theatre, for many years, taught art at the Zagreb School of Crafts, and organized art exhibitions and installations.

Kovačević was part of the influential Earth Group in the 1930s, and later exhibited with the Croatian Group of Artists.

Edo Kovačević was a member of the Croatian Academy of Sciences and Arts, and received the Vladimir Nazor Award for lifetime achievement in the arts in 1981.

== Biography ==
Edo Kovačević was born 16 November 1906 in Gospić, then in Austria-Hungary, now in Croatia In 1909, the family moved to Zagreb.

In 1926, Kovačević enrolled in the Academy of Fine Arts, Zagreb, graduating in 1930 in the class of Vladimir Becić. In 1928, a two-week stay in Paris with a group of fellow students opened up new horizons for him, including an encounter with Krsto Hegedušić and Leo Junek, also in Paris at the time. Back in Zagreb, he kept in contact with these founders of the Earth Group (Grupa Zemlja), whose ideological views were bringing current social problems and the grim reality of rural life into contemporary art. Immediately following his graduation, Kovačević received a grant from the state government (Sava Banovina) and spent a year (1930/31) in Paris studying fresco painting. During this year, Kovačević did not get involved in painterly or bohemian circles, but joined the international left-wing group around Le Monde, which held meetings and lectures about modern art. His visits to the studio of Amédée Ozenfant, the founder of Purism, made a strong impression on him, along with the works of Giotto, Fra Angelico and Velasquez.

On his return to Zagreb, Kovačević joined the Earth Group in 1932, exhibiting with them at their 4th Exhibition at the Art Pavilion in Zagreb. He was a member of the group until 1935.

From 1934 to 1940, he taught art at the Craft School in Zagreb.

Kovačević created his first set designs in 1934 for the Croatian National Theatre in Zagreb. For nearly 60 years, he designed theatrical sets for the National Theatre, and the Drama Theatre in Zagreb, the Dubrovnik Summer Festival, the Zagreb Puppet Theatre, and his work appeared in Ljubljana and Prague. During that time, he also organized over a hundred exhibitions of paintings.

Between 1936 and 1940 Kovačević exhibited with the Group of Croatian Artists. His work on exhibition set-up gave him opportunities to travel around Europe, especially Paris, and to the United States (1939). After the Second World War, Kovačević travelled extensively around Europe, to Geneva, Zurich and Venice, and Paris several times (1954, 1956 and 1958).

Kovačević's first solo exhibition was held in 1955 at the French Institute in Zagreb. In 1964, the Gallery of Contemporary Art, Zagreb held a retrospective exhibit of his work, and in 1978, the Museum of Contemporary Art, Zagreb held a new retrospective exhibit.

In 1977, Edo Kovačević was elected a member of the Croatian Academy of Sciences and Arts, and in 1981, he received the Vladimir Nazor Award for lifetime achievement in the arts.

Edo Kovačević died in Zagreb on 15 March 1993.

== Legacy ==
Edo Kovačević participated in the art movements that defined modern Croatian painting. His paintings displayed an exceptional feeling for design, clarity of form and colour harmonies. His work was well received by the general public and, he had many positive reviews from art critics.

Kovačević was recognized by his professor Vladimir Becić as one of his most talented students. Early on, he developed his own distinctive style, influenced by the social ideologies of the Zemlja group, and the reaction against depicting volume in the form. However, in contrast to the wider scenes of rural hardship produced by other members of the group, Kovačević conveyed his message using the small details that told of a very basic way of life. His painting "Cornbread" (1930) condenses the hardship of the farm labourer's life into a small tableau - on a rough-hewn peasant table sits a piece of cornbread, a bowl of cheese and a folding knife.

In the same way, Kovačević embarked on a series of life in the suburbs for the ordinary people. They stand as a document of the growth of the city, and the movement of people from the countryside. During his time with Zemlja, his paintings show the typical flat and rather geometrical style of the rest of the group. However, his use of colour harmonies, and the feeling of empathy with his subject are all his own. Kovačević uses warm, muted colour tones and simplified shapes to portray the living spaces, courtyards, roofs, streets and factories, without showing us the faces of the people that live there and work. By 1934, his painting "Kožarska ulica", shows a refined colour palette, and a move away from the folk art stylization.

In the mid-1930s, Kovačević produced a series of drawings and gouaches of rural life around the village of Žabno. He began to paint with more expressiveness, using colour to reinterpret nature, and using more dynamic brush-strokes to animate the painted surface. Over the next few years, he began to narrow down his range of colours, and to simplify and order the design. Wartime brought increasingly muted paintings, spare designs of still lifes and portraits in monochromatic tones. The anxieties of war showed in the dramatic painting "Začretje Castle" (1941) with its moody colour palette and ordered composition. That style continued into the post-war period, as life under the new socialist realism took hold.

Paris (1954), India ink and pastel on paper

By the late 1940s, Kovačević began to experiment with more specific colouring to convey the mood of his subjects. His "Self-Portrait" of 1948 was a personal vision in which he reduced the design to its essentials and established a muted colour palette in predominantly soft blues. This colouring was to become characteristic of his later work. At around the same time, he began to spend time on the Adriatic coast, working on landscapes with more open spaces and warm, bright colours. These paintings showed more vibrancy, with richer colour schemes and geometrical structures, building volumes with broad planes.

Through the 1950s, Kovačević continued to develop his characteristic muted colour palette. His visits to Paris resulted in a series of drawings, pastels and oils that convey his personal impressions of the city. In tones of blue and brown, his beautifully designed compositions are perfectly balanced, and have been described by Grgo Gamulin as masterpieces of Croatian art.

Stari krovovi Zagreba ("The old Zagreb roofs", 1963)

During the 1960s, Kovačević experimented with printing and lithography, in which he came close to abstraction in his simplified designs. He began to use more symbolism in his work, especially in floral compositions. And this was the time of his "Zagreb Roofs" cycle, in which Kovačević created rich, dynamic patterns based on the network of old roofs as seen from the upper town of the city. One of the high points of the series is the tapestry "Roofs", created in 1969, into which all his earlier ideas were woven using a rich, harmonious blend of colours. The roofs series stands as one of his most important works, dedicated to the city where he spent almost his entire life.

Edo Kovačević's later work was inspired by the landscapes of the Zagreb foothills and Hrvatsko zagorje, capturing nature in all its different weather and seasons. The woods of Zelengaj, close by his house, feature in many of his most lyrical pieces. Using oils or more expressively, pastels, he modified his colour palette subtly to interpret the atmospheric conditions from warm summer sunshine, soft spring rains or dense winter fog.

During this time, too, he painted flowers - wild woodland flowers and summer meadow flowers in simple glasses, vases and pots. As Kovačević himself said, "to paint flowers means to paint human joy, human nature, its unspoiled childish dream, its wonder at the world, its humanity. Aren't all these motifs that are worthy of painting?«. The subject allowed him full rein to use his compositions skills and rich colour chords.

Edo Kovačević was an artist that preferred to paint the less obvious views, and from uncommon angles. The backs and sides of buildings rather than the front. A glimpse into a humble courtyard, or a view across rooftops. He took simple subjects and used them to tell of the human condition, and he took joy in the beauty of nature. He was, above all a master colourist, and he created form and emotion in colour.

== Works ==
=== Paintings ===
List of paintings is taken from the Exhibition Catalogue for the 2006/2007 Retrospective unless otherwise indicated.

- Cornbread, 1930
- Barutanski jarak (Barutan ditch), 1932
- Paper Factory, 1932
- Vineyards / Bukovački Breg, 1932
- Radnički dol
- Kožarska Ulica (Kožarska Street), 1934
- Začretje Castle, 1941
- Black Bottle, 1942
- Portrait of Mira, 1942
- Self-portrait, 1948
- Rovinj, 1948
- Yellow Houses in Bol, 1955
- Louvre, 1958
- Winter, 1964/65
- Signs (1966)
- Zagrebački krovovi (Zagreb roofs), 1964
- (Old Roofs – Duga ulica, 1962; Roofs – Mesnička ulica, 1966; Morning – Tkalčićeva ulica, 1963, and others).
- Zelengaj in Winter, 1970
- Snowman, 1970
- Rainy Spring, 1971
- Medvednica, 1972
- Zimska Radost (Winter happiness), 1973
- Mikulići - Springtide, 1975
- Šestine in Fog, 1975
- Klanječki vinogradi (Klanječki vineyards), 1981

=== Tapestry ===
- Roofs, 1969

=== Theatrical set designs ===
- Čudnovate zgode šegrta Hlapića (Marvellous Adventures of Hlapić the Apprentice), 1934
- Hofmanove priče (Tales of Hoffmann), 1934

== Exhibitions ==
Recent solo exhibitions of Edo Kovačević's work include

=== Solo exhibitions ===
- 2006-2007 Edo Kovačević Retrospective, Art Pavilion, Zagreb
- 2003 Edo Kovačević - Dalmatian landscapes (graphics), Croatian Academy of Sciences and Arts
- 1997-8 Hommage Edo Kovačević 1906-1993 : Museum Gallery Klovićevi dvori, Zagreb
- 1993 Edo Kovačević - Landscapes Of Zagorje, Art Pavilion, Zagreb
- 1987 Edo Kovačević: Old Roofs of Zagreb, City Museum of Zagreb
- 1978 Edo Kovačić Retrospective, Art Pavilion, Zagreb
- 1964 Edo Kovačić Retrospective, Museum of Contemporary Art, Zagreb

=== Group exhibitions ===
Recent group exhibitions that have included works by Edo Kovačević

- 2010 Intimism in Croatian Fine Art 1930-1950, Modern Gallery, Zagreb

=== Public collections ===
Edo Kovačević's work can be found in the following public collections

- Museum of Contemporary Art, Zagreb
- Croatian Museum of Naive Art, Zagreb
- City Museum of Zagreb
- Gallery of Fine Arts, Osijek

== Bibliography ==
- Edo Kovačević, 1906-1993 Author: Miroslav Begović. Publisher: Croatian Academy of Sciences and Arts, Zagreb. 1997. Series: Spomenica preminulim akademicima, sv. 76.
- Hommage Edo Kovačević 1906-1993 Author: Josip Depolo. Publisher: Muzejsko-galerijski centar, Klovićevi dvori, Zagreb. 1997. Exhibition Catalog
