= Vera Nikolić Podrinska =

Croatian painter and baroness

- Born: June 8, 1886; Zagreb, Kingdom of Croatia-Slavonia, Austria-Hungary
- Died: March 28, 1972 (aged 85); Zagreb, Croatia
- Known for: Painting, Writing

Vera Nikolić Podrinska (June 8, 1886 in Zagreb – March 28, 1972 in Zagreb) was a Croatian painter and baroness.

== Biography ==
Podrinska was the daughter of baron Vladimir Nikolić and baroness Gabriella Ella Franziska Maria, née Scotti. Nikolić was taught painting by the Croatian painter Oton Iveković from 1900, and in Paris by Andre Lhote and hr:Leo Junek. In 1917 she had her first solo exhibition.

In 1944 a prison camp was established at her property on Pantovčak street in Zagreb by the government of the Independent State of Croatia. At the camp were held American captured pilots. The pilots were allowed to work at Nikolić vineyard and could use her estate to play tennis and listen to music, among other activities.

After the war her property was either nationalized or bought up by the ruling Communist Party and Vila Zagorje, an estate of Yugoslav leader Josip Broz, was built. She published the travel book Od Zagreba do Bangkoka (From Zagreb to Bangkok) in 1957.

Nikolić travelled to the United States of America in 1966 to attend a showing of her works. She was greeted by several of the former prisoners who were held at her estate during World War II.
