= Stjepan Gomboš =

Croatian-Jewish architect (1895–1975)

- Born: 10 March 1895; Sombor, Austro-Hungarian Monarchy, (now Serbia)
- Died: 27 April 1975 (aged 80); Zagreb, SFR Yugoslavia, (now Croatia)
- Occupation: Architect

Stjepan Gomboš (1895–1975) was a Croatian-Jewish architect responsible for the design of many business and residential buildings throughout the city of Zagreb. Gomboš was also active in other parts of Croatia and, as a writer, contributed much to the Croatian modern architecture. He was buried at the Mirogoj Cemetery.

== Bibliography ==
- Snješka Knežević, Aleksander Laslo (2011). Židovski Zagreb. Zagreb: AGM, Židovska općina Zagreb. ISBN 978-953-174-393-8.
- Goldstein, Ivo (2005). Židovi u Zagrebu 1918 - 1941. Zagreb: Novi Liber. ISBN 953-6045-23-0.
