= Drago Ibler =

Croatian architect (1894–1964)

- Born: 14 August 1894; Zagreb, Austria-Hungary
- Died: 12 September 1964 (aged 70); Novo Mesto, Yugoslavia
- Occupation: Architect
- Buildings: District Labour Insurance Building in Zagreb; District Labour Insurance Building in Mostar; House Wellisch (Zagreb); District Labour Insurance Building in Skopje

Drago Ibler (14 August 1894 – 12 September 1964) was a Croatian architect and pedagogue. His style can be described as pure simplicity and functional architecture.

Ibler was born in Zagreb and he earned a diploma in architecture at the Technische Hochschule in Dresden, Germany. He became acquainted with Le Corbusier and L'Esprit Nouveau in Paris. He then studied from 1922 to 1924 at the Staatliche Kunstakademie in Berlin, in the studio of German architect Hans Poelzig which influenced his work during 1920s.

Drago Ibler was a strong supporter of the social ideals of modern architecture as well as the aesthetics, and founded the Earth Group (Croatian: Grupa Zemlja), with a group of left-oriented progressive artists. He was also a member of CIAM. His work was responsible for introducing ribbon windows and other elements of Le Corbusier's architecture to Yugoslavia.

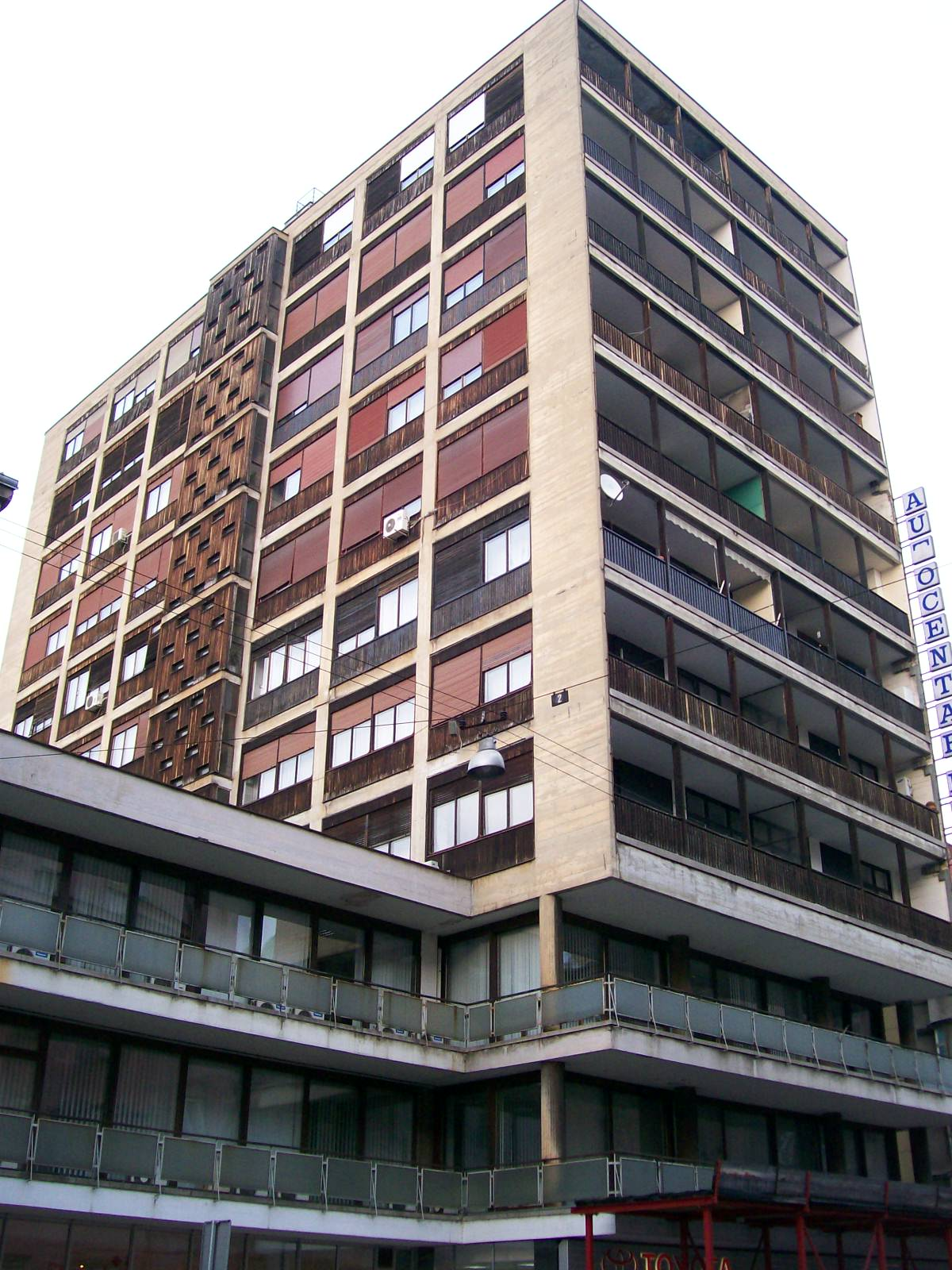
Ibler's ten-story building in Zagreb, built in 1958, colloquially referred to as the "Wooden Skyscraper" (Croatian: Drveni neboder)

In 1926, Drago Ibler became a professor of architecture at the Zagreb Academy of Fine Arts. During his time there, Ibler designed villas on the island of Korčula and in Zagreb, several industrial buildings, and the District Labour Insurance Building in Skopje (1932). He left the Zagreb Academy in 1941 moved to the University of Geneva, Switzerland. He moved back to Zagreb in 1950 and resumed his former post at the Zagreb Academy. He designed many more buildings in Zagreb, including several residential blocks and a residence for Tito. He also drafted designs for a potential opera house and embassy, though these were never constructed.

Ibler died, aged 70, in an automobile accident near Novo Mesto, Slovenia.
