= Juraj Dobrović =

Croatian artist

Juraj Dobrović (pronounced [jûraj dǒːbrovit͡ɕ]; born 1928 in Jelsa, Croatia) is a Croatian artist working in the media of sculpture, painting and graphic arts. The focus of his art is mainly oriented towards geometrical structures. He makes use of light effects to emphasize the plasticity of the form. Dobrović's works are closely related to the principles of Geometric abstraction and Neo-constructivism. He lives and works in Zagreb, Croatia.

He belonged to the New Tendencies art movement and participated at the New Tendencies exhibitions in Zagreb (1965, 1969 and 1973). He published the graphic maps Fields 1 (1967), Fields 2 (1969) and Campi 3 (1971). He is especially known for his spatial constructions and reliefs for example Spatial Construction, 1966 and Folded Square, 1973.

He has had solo exhibitions in Croatia and abroad (since 1962). He has exhibited at the Venice Biennale (1972), the São Paulo Art Biennial (1973), at Expo-67 in Montreal (1967) and in the exhibition, Constructivism and Kinetic Art (Zagreb, 1995). He had a retrospective exhibition at the Glyptotheque of the Croatian Academy in Zagreb (2003). He was a five-time winner of the Zagreb School of Yugoslav Graphic Arts biennial exhibition award (1966–1982). His works are kept by Croatian and renowned European museums and private collections.

One extensive catalogue and one monograph about his work have been published to date:

- Župan, Ivica - Juraj Dobrović: Spatial Constructions – Reliefs - Paintings: 1962–2002, (Croatian Academy of Sciences and Arts, Glyptotheque HAZU, Zagreb, 2003).
- Denegri, Jerko - Juraj Dobrović (DAF, Zagreb, 2007).
