= Krsto Hegedušić =

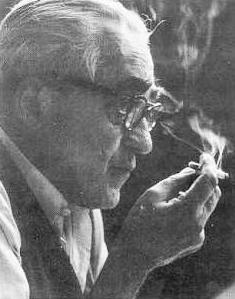
Krsto Hegedušić

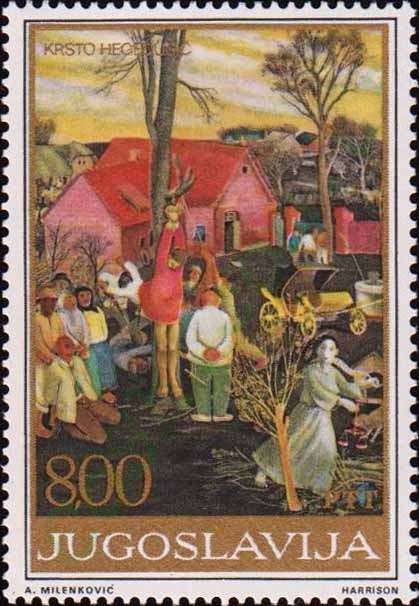
Punishment

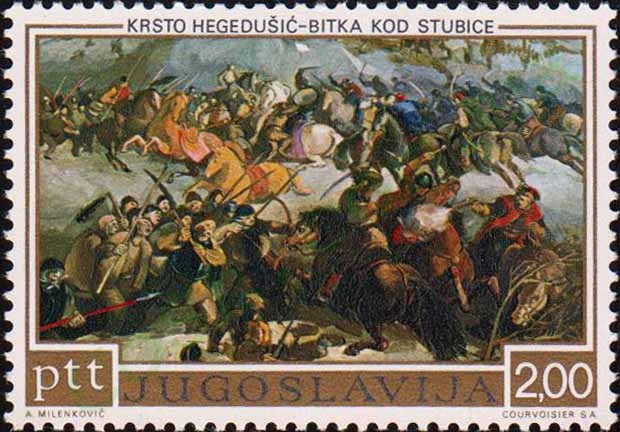
Battle of Stubice

Krsto Hegedušić (26 November 1901 – 7 April 1975) was a Croatian painter, illustrator and theater designer. His most famous paintings depict the harsh life of the Croatian peasantry in the manner of naive art. He was one of the founders of the Earth Group.

== Biography ==
He was born in Petrinja, but when his father died in 1909, the family came back to Hlebine, the village in the region of Podravina from which they originated.

In 1920 Hegedušić enrolled in the Arts and Crafts College in Zagreb, where he made his first idyllic paintings of Podravina. The painting courses of Vladimir Becić and Tomislav Krizman widened his horizons, but did not influence his style.

In 1926 he was awarded a French government scholarship and spent two years in Paris. There he studied the paintings of Pieter Brueghel.

Hegedušić made his first one-man exhibition with Juraj Plančić at the Ulrich Gallery in Zagreb in 1926. He made paintings with social themes, showing the exploitation of the Croatian peasants. In 1929 he got together with the painters Ivan Tabaković and Oton Postružnik, as well as Leo Junek in Paris. They founded Zemlja ("soil" in Croatian), the first Croatian group of artists that promoted Marxism. Hegedušić was their ideologue and unofficial leader. Paintings like The Accordionist and The Flood are socially critical and reject purely artistic goals.

In 1930 he founded the Hlebine School, a naive art movement that involved young peasant painters. One of them, Ivan Generalić, reached world fame. Podravina Motifs, published in 1933, was a book combining his drawings with a poetic essay by Miroslav Krleža, today considered a masterpiece of Croatian literature. Krleža would later write a script for a documentary feature about Hegedušić (1962).

Hegedušić started teaching at the Academy of Fine Arts Zagreb in 1936. During the anti-communist oppression in the 1930s, he was arrested several times. When the Nazi-sponsored Ustaša came to power in 1941, Hegedušić came under the protection of the Archbishop Stepinac. He spent the war quietly working on various themes, including religion (numerous sketches for the Calvary fresco in Marija Bistrica in 1941). When the communist government overtook power in Yugoslavia in 1945, Hegedušić was appointed as a regular professor at the Zagreb Academy. In 1950, he founded a "master's studio" there. The "master's studio" eventually gathered an impressive list of notable painters such as Miroslav Šutej, Zlatko Sirotić, and others.

After the World War II, he started painting some surrealistic paintings. For example, Dead Waters is somewhat remindful of themes of the Theatre of the Absurd.

Paintings like The Bridegroom, the Ox and the Pump from 1969 are critical of urban life. In the period 1971–73, Hegedušić worked on a large cycle of macabre frescoes for the war memorial of Tjentište.

He illustrated books and designed ballet and theater sets. He died in Zagreb in 1975.

== Sources ==
- HEGEDUŠIĆ, Krsto at lzmk.hr (in Croatian)
- Comment to Dead Waters, in Muzeji Jugoslavije by Dragoslav Srejović; Oto Bihalji-Merin; Ivan Brajdić; Dragoljub Kažic, Ljubljana : Mladinska knjiga (1973)
