= Ivan Tabaković =

Serbian painter, sculptor

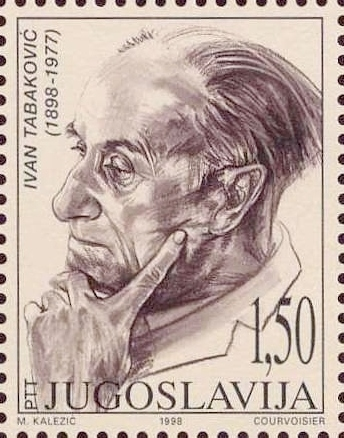

Ivan Tabaković (10 December 1898, Arad – 27 June 1977, Belgrade) was an Austro-Hungarian-born Serbian painter.

== Biography ==
Tabaković was born in Arad, then part of the Habsburg Empire, in 1898, a son of noted Serbian architect Milan Tabaković. He studied at the Budapest Academy of Fine Arts in Budapest, and afterwards, at the Royal Academy of Applied Arts in Zagreb and Academy of Fine Arts in Munich. Tabaković's education under the mentorship of Ljubo Babić in Zagreb and with Hans Hofmann in Munich, guided his painting towards the foundations of modernist painting.

In 1926, after the proclamation of the Kingdom of Yugoslavia, he was engaged as a part-time draftsman at the Institute of Anatomy in Zagreb. There, he spent time with Croatian artist Oton Postružnik and founded the Zagreb group "Zemlja" (1929). Zemlja paintings functioned as a critique of society, depicting rural life in Yugoslavia through local roots. This period culminated in the painting Genius (1929), the zenith of his Zagreb period (1925–1930). He moved to Novi Sad in 1930, and later became a professor at the Academy of Fine Arts in Belgrade. His Novi Sad period (1930–1938) was marked by a gradual abandonment of the Zemlja style morphologically, stylistically and partially ideologically and instead became "characterized by a multitude of extraordinary depictions of private and public spaces, still-lifes and landscapes with brilliant drawings, with elements of melancholy and sophisticated use of color, richly nuanced."

His Belgrade period (1938–1977) encompassed several experimental-creative phases. The first one (1938–1955) continued an already established melancholic-poetic procedure often permeated by elements of grotesque, irony and sarcasm. After the foundation of Socialist Federal Republic of Yugoslavia's Academy of Applied Arts (in 1948), he continued his work at the Ceramics Department. This resulted with politically motivated passionate criticism of his art after World War II. A true turning point in Tabaković's opus came with the entities of "The origin and forms of visual expression" and "Sources of visual research – Analysis and photographic records," with theses that had the character of manifestos (1955). The second Belgrade period (1955–1977) was characterized by emphatic independent research into the fundamental principles of the modernist painting, chiefly its two-dimensional plane, as well as the non-mimetic approach through the use of pure, non-descriptive visual elements. His other research was aimed at the object, sculpture, collage and trick photography with the application of the visual logic of the early post-modern, aimed at the creation of super oeuvre created by the proliferation of landscapes, fragments, paintings, clippings, signs, emblems and symbols. It was this eccentric, creative and experimental period of the second half of the twentieth century that made Tabaković one of the most significant, exceptionally individual, indigenous innovators in Serbian modern art.

He taught painting to Aleksa Ivanc Olivieri.

He became a member of the Serbian Academy of Sciences and Arts in 1965.

Tabaković won a Grand Prix for ceramics at the Exposition Internationale des Arts et Techniques dans la Vie Moderne in Paris (1937), where he exhibited four panels.

Tabaković died at Belgrade on 27 June 1977.

== Works ==
- Genius (1924)
- Shadows (1954)
- Message (1968)
