= Šenoa =

Šenoa is a Croatian surname of German origin, originally Schönoa, Schöynoha, or Schenoha. Notable people with the surname include:

- August Šenoa (1838–1881), Croatian writer
- Branko Šenoa (1879–1939), Croatian painter, graphic artist and art historian, son of August Šenoa
- Milan Šenoa (1869–1961), Croatian geographer, son of August Šenoa
