= The Goldsmith's Treasure =

1871 novel by August Šenoa

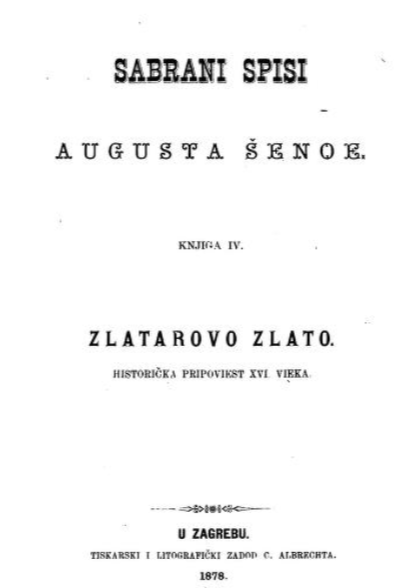
- Title page in original Croatian Zlatarovo zlato (1878 edition)
- Author: August Šenoa
- Original title: Zlatarovo zlato
- Translator: Neven Divjakinja
- Language: Croatian
- Subject: fall of nobility, love plot
- Genre: historical novel
- Set in: 16th-century Zagreb
- Publisher: Vienac
- Publication date: August–December 1871
- Publication place: Croatia
- English publication date: 2015

The Goldsmith's Treasure (Croatian: Zlatarovo zlato) is a historical novel by Croatian novelist August Šenoa, among the most distinguished works of 19th-century Croatian literature as well as the most well-known piece of literature on Zagreb. Set in 16th-century Zagreb, right after Croatian-Slovene Peasant Revolt, the novel depicts Zagreb's urban life, fall of nobility and rise of citizenry that is slowly taking over institutions of society, intertwined by a plot of forbidden youth love of Dora, a goldsmith's daughter, and Pavle, a nobleman.

The novel was originally published in serial form between August and December 1871 in Vienac magazine. It was subsequently translated into Czech, Esperanto, French, German, Polish, Russian, Slovak and Slovene. The first translation into English was published in 2015 and in 2020 in Spanish.

Andrija Maurović and Radovan Devlić published comic adaptations of the novel. A sculpture of central character Dora Krupić by Ivo Kerdić in the niche of the Stone Gate is one of Zagreb's most noted literary landmarks; Dora's home in the novel is situated near the Gate.
