= List of people on the postage stamps of Croatia =

This is a list of people on stamps of Croatia.

== 1991–present ==
- Andrija Ljudevit Adamić, businessman (2006)
- Josip Andreis, musicologist (2009)
- Ivo Andrić, writer (2001)
- Anthony of Padua, saint of the Roman Catholic Church (1995)
- Gjuro Baglivi, physician (2007)
- Mate Balota, writer (1998)
- Krešimir Baranović, composer (1994)
- Milan Begović, writer (1998)
- Federiko Benković, painter (2003)
- Stjepan Betlheim, physician (1998)
- Bruno Bjelinski, composer (2009)
- Ivan Brkanović, composer (2006)
- Ivana Brlić-Mažuranić, writer (1996)
- Hermann Bollé, architect (1995)
- Spiridon Brusina, biologist (1995)
- Franjo Bučar, sports popularizer and writer (1994)
- Frane Bulić, archeologist (1996)
- Ivan Bunić Vučić, poet (1992)
- Josip Buturac, historian (2005)
- Dobriša Cesarić, poet (2002)
- Charles the Great, Holy Roman Emperor (2001)
- Milo Cipra, composer (2006)
- Clare of Assisi, saint of the Roman Catholic Church (2008)
- Stjepan Cosmi, archbishop of Split (2000)
- Croatia men's national handball team (2003^{*})
- Croatia men's national water polo team (2007^{*})
- Krešimir Ćosić, basketball player (2005)
- Marya Delvard, singer and actress (2003)
- Juraj Dobrila, bishop (2012)
- Julije Domac, biologist (1996)
- Marco Antonio de Dominis, archbishop (2010)
- Domnius, saint of the Roman Catholic Church (2004)
- Džore Držić, writer (2001)
- Marin Držić, writer (2008)
- Dubravko Dujšin, actor (1997)
- Florian, patron saint of firefighters (2005)
- Francis of Assisi, saint of the Roman Catholic Church (2009)
- Fran Krsto Frankopan, nobleman and poet (1996)
- Ljudevit Gaj, politician, linguist and writer (2009)
- Grgo Gamulin, art historian and writer (2010)
- Vilko Gecan, painter (1994)
- Dragutin Gorjanović-Kramberger, paleontologist (1999)
- Jakov Gotovac, composer (1995)
- Gottschalk of Orbais, monk, theologian and poet (1996)
- Juraj Habdelić, writer and lexicographer (2009)
- Josip Hatze, composer and conductor (2003)
- Juraj Haulik, archbishop of Zagreb (1999)
- Andrija Hebrang Sr., politician (1999)
- Luka Ibrišimović, Franciscan friar and rebellion leader (1998)
- Goran Ivanišević, tennis player (2001^{*})
- Dragojla Jarnević, writer (2012)
- Josip Jelačić, soldier and politician (1992, 1998, 1999)
- Jerome, saint of the Roman Catholic Church (2003)
- Jesus, religious leader (2010)
- John the Evangelist, author of the Gospel of John (2009)
- John Paul II, Pope of the Roman Catholic Church (1994^{*}, 1998^{*}, 2003^{*}, 2005)
- Marija Jurić Zagorka, writer and journalist (2007)
- Andrija Kačić Miošić, poet (2004)
- Janko Polić Kamov, writer (2010)
- Antun Kanižlić, theologian and poet (1999)
- Ljubo Karaman, art historian (2006)
- Matija Petar Katančić, writer and lexicographer (2000)
- Augustin Kažotić, bishop (2002)
- Vjekoslav Klaić, historian (1999)
- Ivica Kostelić, alpine skier (2003^{*}, 2011^{*})
- Janica Kostelić, alpine skier (2001^{*}, 2003^{*})
- Ivan Goran Kovačić, poet and writer (1993)
- Josip Kozarac, writer (2006)
- Miroslav Kraljević, painter (2004)
- Silvije Strahimir Kranjčević, poet (2008)
- Baltazar Adam Krčelić, historian and theologian (2005)
- Marko Krizin, saint of the Roman Catholic Church (1996)
- Miroslav Krleža, writer (1993)
- Frano Kršinić, sculptor (1997)
- Izidor Kršnjavi, art historian (1995)
- Franjo Kuharić, archbishop of Zagreb (2002)
- Ivan Kukuljević, historian, politician and writer (1993)
- Igor Kuljerić, composer and conductor (2008)
- Eugen Kvaternik, politician (1996)
- Matko Laginja, writer and politician (2002)
- Emilij Laszowski, historian and archivist (1999)
- Milan Lenuci, urbanist (1999)
- Vatroslav Lisinski, composer (1994)
- Ferdo Livadić, composer (1999)
- Livia Drusilla, wife of Roman emperor Augustus (2005)
- Blaž Lorković, economist (1992)
- Hanibal Lucić, poet and playwright (2003)
- Ivan Lučić, historian (2004)
- Martin of Tours, saint of the Roman Catholic Church (2009)
- Marko Marulić, writer (2000)
- Lovro Matačić, conductor (1995)
- Ivan Matetić Ronjgov, composer (2010)
- Antun Gustav Matoš, writer (1998)
- Andrija Maurović, illustrator and comic book author (2001)
- Ivan Merz, academic (1996)
- Ivan Meštrović, sculptor (2008)
- Andrija Mohorovičić, seismologist and meteorologist (2007)
- Vladimir Nazor, writer (1999)
- Krsto Odak, composer (2008)
- Vlaho Paljetak, composer (1993)
- Boris Papandopulo, composer (2006)
- Vesna Parun, poet (2012)
- Petar Snačić, king of Croatia (1997)
- Frane Petrić, philosopher and scientist (1997)
- Dražen Petrović, basketball player (1994)
- Gjuro Pilar, geologist (1996)
- Vladimir Prelog, chemist (2001)
- Ferdo Quiquerez, painter (1993)
- Vanja Radauš, sculptor (2006)
- Antun Radić, scholar and politician (2004)
- Stjepan Radić, politician (1992, 1996, 2004)
- Matija Antun Relković, writer (1998)
- Rembrandt, painter (2006)
- Ivan Rendić, sculptor (1999)
- Nasta Rojc, painter (2006)
- Lavoslav Ružička, chemist (2001)
- Marija Ružička Strozzi, actress (2000)
- Tadija Smičiklas, historian (1993)
- Ante Starčević, politician (1992, 1996)
- Stephen Držislav, king of Croatia (1997)
- Aloysius Stepinac, archbishop of Zagreb (1998)
- Josip Juraj Strossmayer, bishop and benefactor (1992)
- Franz von Suppé, composer (1995)
- Petar Šegedin, writer (2009)
- Ante Šercer, physician (1996)
- Antun Branko Šimić, poet (1998)
- Juraj Šižgorić, poet (2009)
- Antun Šoljan, writer (2003)
- Josip Štolcer-Slavenski, composer (1996)
- Nikola Šubić Zrinski, nobleman and soldier (1996)
- Bogoslav Šulek, philologist, historian and lexicographer (1995)
- Stjepan Šulek, composer (2005)
- Zlatko Šulentić, painter (1993)
- Dragutin Tadijanović, poet (2005^{*})
- Nikola Tesla, electrical engineer and inventor (1993, 2006)
- Ivo Tijardović, composer (1995)
- Josip Eugen Tomić, writer (1993)
- Tomislav, king of Croatia (1992)
- Ante Topić Mimara, art collector and benefactor (1998)
- Tryphon, saint of the Roman Catholic Church (2009)
- Franjo Tuđman, politician (1997^{*}, 1999)
- Tin Ujević, poet (2005)
- Pavao Ritter Vitezović, writer, historian, linguist and publisher (2002)
- Blanka Vlašić, high jumper (2007^{*})
- Antun Vrančić, diplomat and writer (2004)
- Ivan Vučetić, anthropologist and police official (2008)
- L. L. Zamenhof, creator of Esperanto (1997)
- Petar Zoranić, writer (2008)
- Katarina Zrinska, noblewoman and writer (1996)
- Nikola Zrinski, nobleman and soldier (1996)
- Petar Zrinski, nobleman and writer (1996)
- Cvijeta Zuzorić, poet (1996)

Notes

^{*} – Stamp dedicated to a living person
