= Rojc =

Rojc is a surname. Notable people with this surname include:

- Matej Rojc (born 1993), Slovenian basketball player
- Nasta Rojc (1883–1964), Croatian painter
