= Stone Gate =

Landmark in Zagreb

- Kamenita vrata
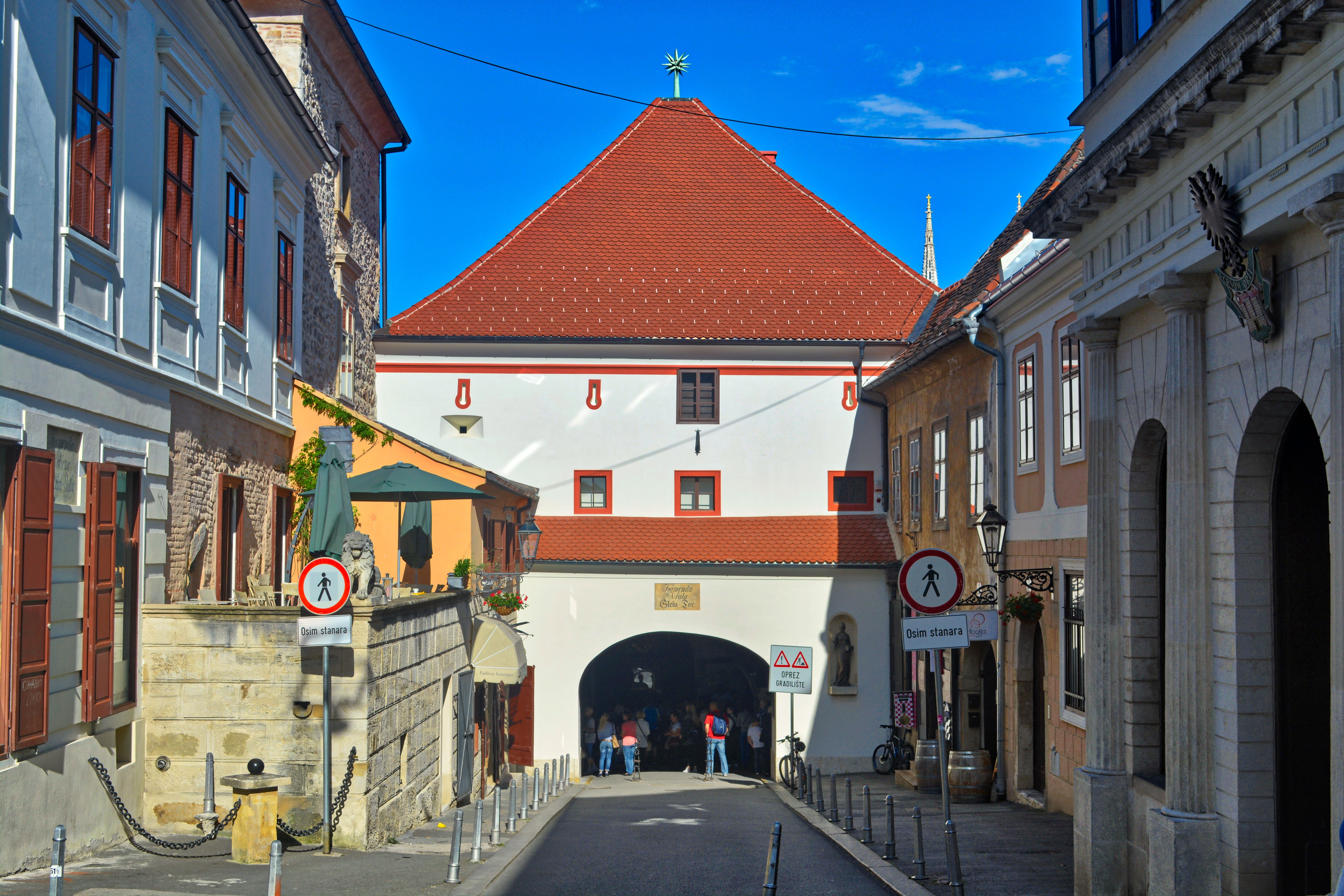
- West side entrance
- Interactive map of the Stone Gate area

General information
- Location: Kamenita ul. 1, Zagreb, Croatia
- Groundbreaking: 1242
- Completed: 1266

Cultural Good of Croatia
- Type: Cultural

The Stone Gate (Croatian: Kamenita vrata) is a landmark in the Upper Town of Zagreb, Croatia built between 1242 and 1266. Its present-day appearance dates from the 18th century. One of the most popular historic monuments in Zagreb's history, it serves as the shrine of Mother Mary, which painting survived the Great Fire of Zagreb in 1731.

== History ==
In 1242, Gradec (today's Zagreb), was declared a free royal city by the Golden Bull. The Golden Bull stipulated that the city must be surrounded by walls and fortifications and that it could only be entered through the city gate.

Today, the best-known and only preserved old city gate is the Stone Gate, which is believed to have been built in 1266. It is located in a building that is the remains of a fortress, and is shaped like a rectangular tower with a carriageway.

The beginning of the veneration of the Mother of God of the Stone Gate is connected with a fire that broke out in the building of the St. Joseph Seminary late in the evening, from 30 to 31 May 1731, and spread, first throughout the Upper Town, and the next day to the neighboring Kaptol. On the third day after the fire, while examining the burnt area, they found an undamaged painting of Saint Mary in the ashes, with only the wooden frame burnt down. This miracle quickly spread throughout Zagreb. The pious widow had a small altar erected under the arch of the Stone Gate, thus enabling all her fellow citizens to venerate this sacred object. An expert commission confirmed that in 1929 the painting was engulfed in flames, which destroyed its wooden base. The experiment proved that the Mother of God was not painted on a fire-resistant material.

On May 31, 1991, Cardinal Franjo Kuharić proclaimed the Mother of God of the Stone Gate the patron saint of the city of Zagreb.

After the earthquake that hit the city of Zagreb on March 22, 2020, not the slightest damage was recorded at the Stone Gate.

== Interior ==
The landmark is located at Kamenita Ulica 3, in Zagreb's Upper Town. Inside is a shrine to God's Mother of the Stony Gate, a name used for Mary, Mother of Jesus when referring to her as the patron saint of the city of Zagreb. The shrine contains a gilded icon of Mary holding baby Jesus, which supposedly survived a fire that occurred in the shrine. The southern and eastern walls of the shrine contain prayers carved into the marble. There is also a series of benches and a table to light candles for prayer.

== In Croatian society ==
The Shrine is considered a holy place among Catholics in Zagreb, who often come to light candles and pray to Mary at the location.

The landmark is included in the Registry of the Cultural Heritage of the Republic of Croatia, managed by the Croatian Ministry of Culture and Media.

The Stone Gate is an important element of the historical romance novel Zlatarevo Zlato (The Goldsmith's Treasure), written by August Šenoa. A small statue of one of the novel's main characters, Dora Krupić, is placed in the niche of the landmark. The sculpture was made by Croatian sculptor, Ivo Kerdić.

== Gallery ==
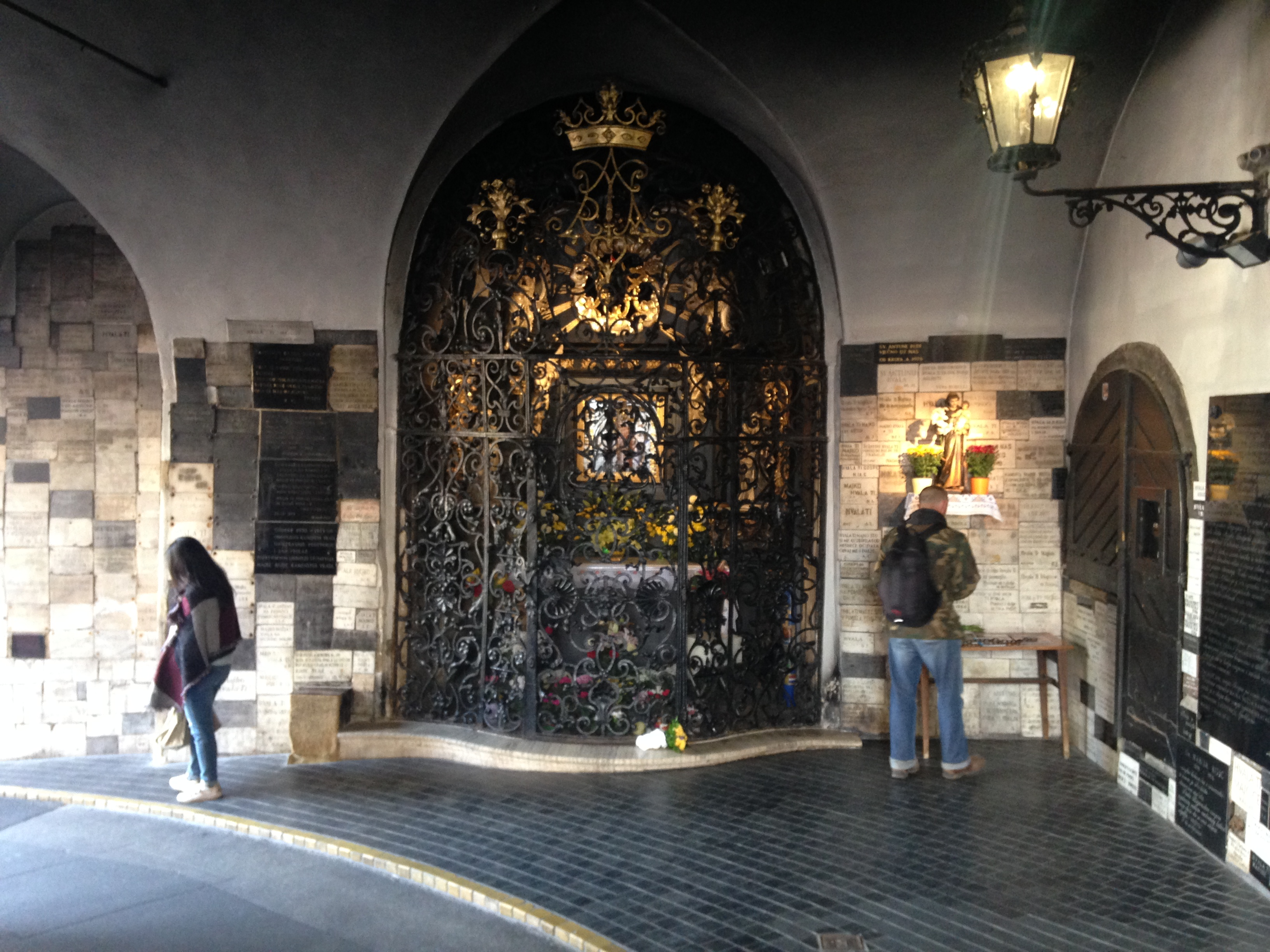
Shrine and altar of Mother Mary

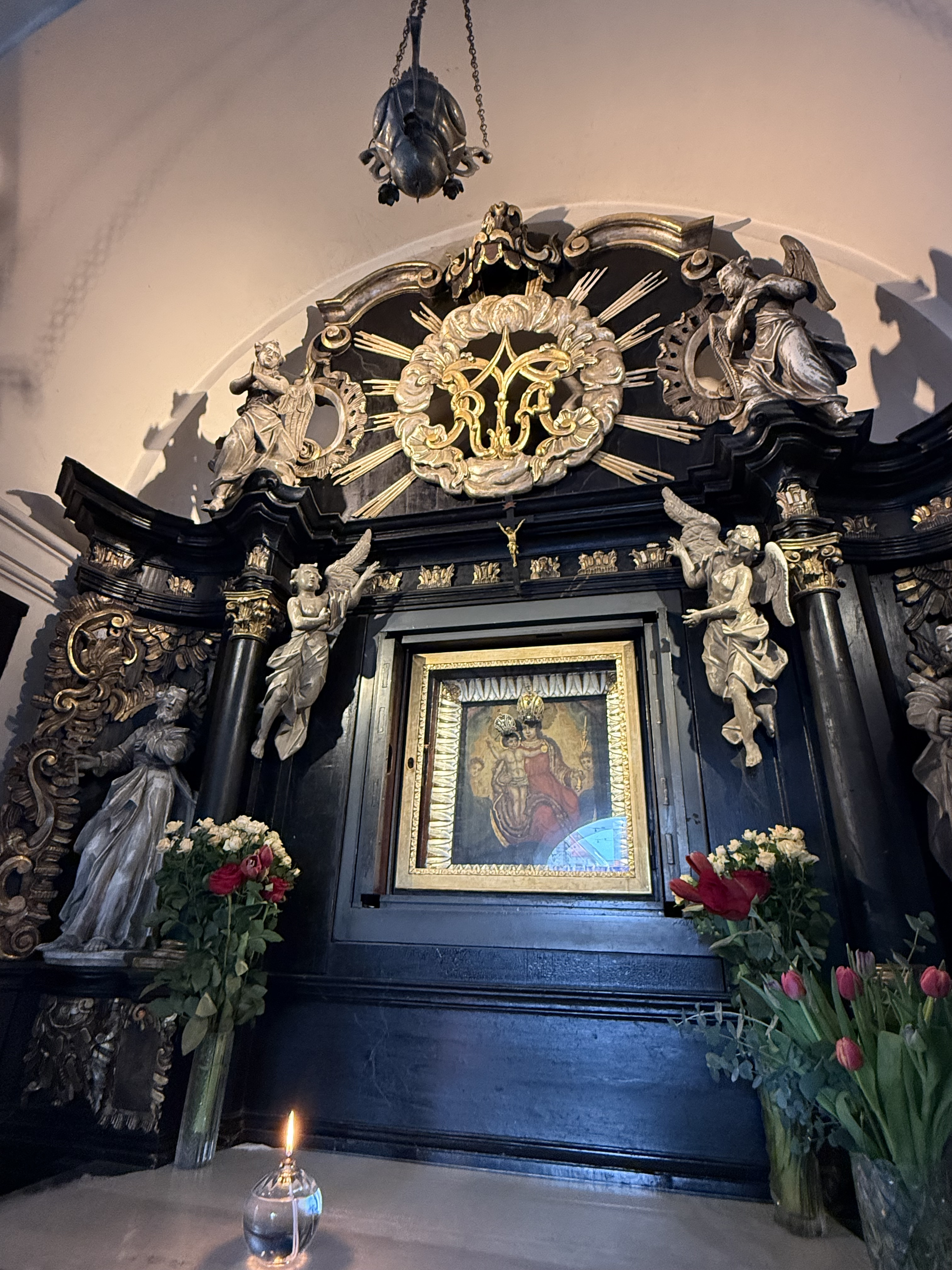
The survival painting of Mother Mary

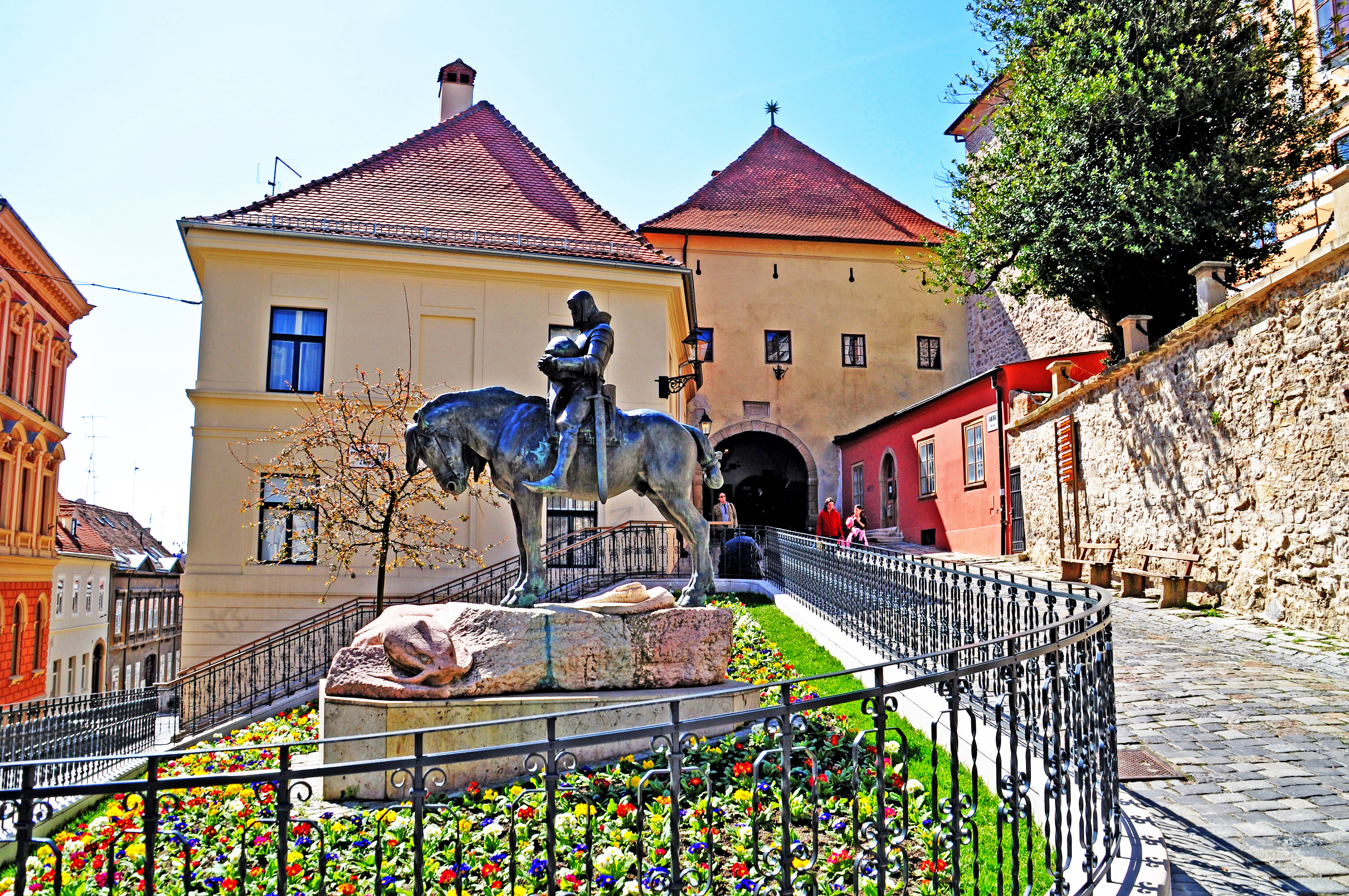
Northern entrance

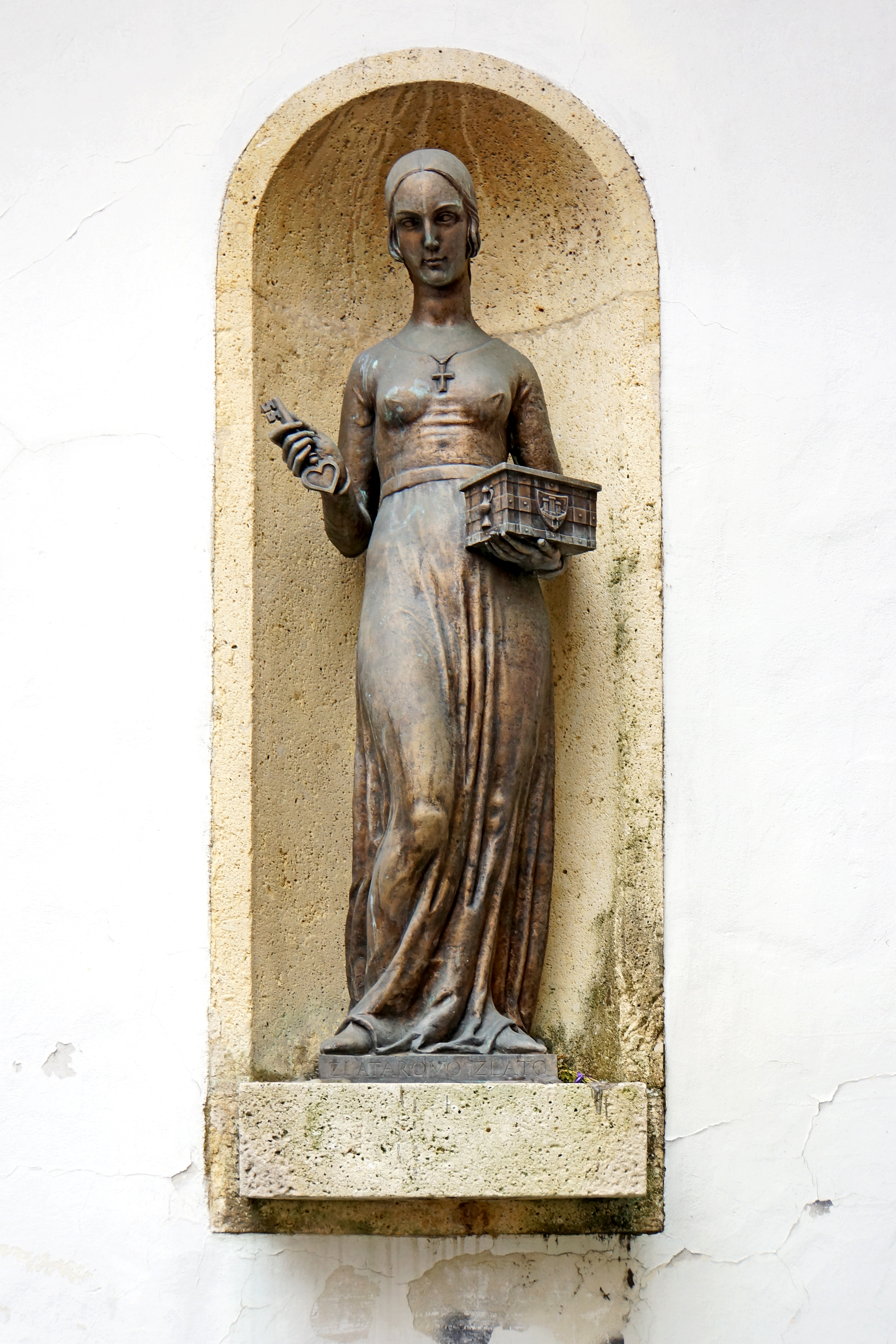
Dora Krupić statue
