= Krestić =

Krestić is a Serbian surname, related to the word "kresta" ("креста"), the Ekavian form of the Serbian word for a rooster's comb.

Persons with the name include:

- Nikola Krestić (1824–1887), Croatian Serb nobleman, politician and lawyer
- Vasilije Krestić (born 1932), historian
