= Alexandrina Maria Onslow =

(born 1868) British WWI hero and partner of Nasta Rojc

- Born: January 27, 1868
- Partner: Nasta Rojc

Alexandrina Maria Onslow (27 January 1868 – 1950) was an official in the British Army during the First World War and a member of the Yugoslav Partisans, decorated with awards on various occasions for her efforts. She shared her life with her partner, Nasta Rojc, and together they were one of the first lesbian couples to live openly in Zagreb.

== Biography ==
Alexandrina Maria Onslow was born on January 27, 1868, to Helen Jane Allardice and Royal Navy capitan Harrington Campbell Onslow.

During World War I, she formed part of the Volunteer Hospital of Australia and was a driver for the French Red Cross. In 1916, she enlisted in the Scottish Women's Hospital and served as a driver on the Eastern Front. In December 1916, she returned to the United Kingdom to recruit more female drivers for the war. In 1918, she came to the Balkans theatre, and one year later met the Croatian painter Nasta Rojc during an excursion to the Adriatic Sea that was organized by the older workers of the Scottish Women's Hospitals.

In 1922, Onslow became the president of the Haverfield Foundation for Serbian Children in Bajina Bašta, following the deaths of its founders, Elsie Inglis and Evelina Haverfield. In 1923, she moved in with Rojc in the house designed and built for them and where they lived until Onslow's death, being one of the first openly lesbian couples in Zagreb. From 1924 and 1925, she traveled with Rojc and Vera Holme, the widow of Haverfield, to England and Scotland.

Although in the United Kingdom Rojc received praise for her works, in Croatia she was a victim of misogynist critiques that sought to discredit her work. For this reason, she founded the Klub likovnih umjetnica (in English, the Club of Women Artists), the first association of artists with the intent to promote the artist careers of women in the region with Lina Virant Crnčić. Onslow, coming from a noble British family, used her influence with influential people, such as Maria of Yugoslavia, to gain sponsorship of the club, organize international networks, and to secure commissions for Rojc, such as a portrait of Alexander I of Yugoslavia. Onslow was also featured in Rojc's works.

When World War II started, Rojc and Onslow joined the Yugoslav Partisans. Following the proclamation of the Independent State of Croatia in 1941, their house was confiscated. In 1943, they were denounced and detained by the Ustaše; the couple was sent to prison despite their advanced age. Both women became ill and were sent to the prison's hospital. With no evidence found to condemn them, the women were released after a few months, but they were not able to return home until 1945, when some of their property was returned to them. They continued their support of the resistance and opposed the expansion of fascism.

In 1946, Onslow, then 76 years old, was blind, deaf, and very ill. She and Rojc greatly depended on the help of their old friends abroad, such as Vera Holme who sent them aid packages and other friends of high status in British politics, such as the ambassador in Belgrade, Ralph Skrine Stevenson.

Onslow, who was awarded for her work in the British military, died in Zagreb in 1950. She was buried in the Mirogoj cemetery, next to where Rojc was later buried after spending the rest of her life single and in poverty.
