= Živila Hrvatska =

Croatian patriotic song

"Živila Hrvatska" (Croatian for 'Long Live Croatia') is a Croatian patriotic song. The lyrics were written by August Šenoa, while the melody was composed by Ivan Zajc.

The lyrics first appeared in the September 1873 print of Vienac magazine and other Croatian publications and was simply titled "Hrvatska pjesma" ('Croatian Song'). The composition was recorded in the 1893 book Hrvatska pjesmarica by Vjekoslav Klaić, where it was titled as "Živila Hrvatska".

== Lyrics ==
Croatian

Glasna, jasna od pameti,
Preko dola, preko gora,
Hrvatska nam pjesma leti,
Sve do našeg sinjeg mora,
Čas je meka, čas ko grom,
Vječna jeka za naš dom.
Hajde poj, hajde poj,
Brate moj, brate moj!

Nek se slože grla bratska, živila Hrvatska,
Nek se slože grla bratska,
Živila, živila, živila Hrvatska!
Živila, živila, živila Hrvatska!

Hrvatskom se opet ori,
Pjesma naših velikana,
U njoj vječnom vatrom gori
Slava Zrinskih-Frankopana.
Čas je meka, čas ko grom,
Vječna jeka za naš dom.
Hajde poj, hajde poj,
Brate moj, brate moj!

English translation

Loud, clear since immemorial,
Over lowlands, over hills,
The Croatian song flies to us,
All the way to our blue sea,
At times soft, at times like thunder,
Eternal echo for our home.
Let's sing, let's sing,
My brother, my brother!

Line up the voices of brothers, long live Croatia,
Line up the voices of brothers,
Long live, long live, long live Croatia!
Long live, long live, long live Croatia!

It resounds across Croatia,
The song of our great men,
In it burns the eternal flame
Of the glory of Zrinski-Frankopan.
At times soft, at times like thunder,
Eternal echo for our home.
Let's sing, let's sing,
My brother, my brother!
