= Andrija Maurović =

Comic book author

- Andrija Maurović
- Born: 29 March 1901 Muo, Kingdom of Dalmatia, Austria-Hungary (now Muo, Montenegro)
- Died: 2 September 1981 (aged 80) Zagreb, SR Croatia, SFR Yugoslavia (now Zagreb, Croatia)
- Areas: Writer, artist
- Notable works: Stari Mačak
- Collaborators: Franjo Fuis

Andrija Maurović (Croatian pronunciation: [ǎndrija maǔːroʋit͡ɕ]; 29 March 1901 – 2 September 1981) was a Croatian comic book illustrator, comic book author, and artist. He is known for his Stari Mačak (Old Mickey, Old Tom-cat) series, which eventually became his nickname. He is often called the father of Croatian and Yugoslav comics.

Maurović was born in Muo near Kotor in the Kingdom of Dalmatia (present-day Montenegro). He enrolled at the Academy of Fine Arts in Zagreb, and subsequently pursued a career as an illustrator and comic book creator for local publications. Along with other writers and artists, he founded the magazine "Mickey Strip" in 1937, where much of his work was serialized. His realistic and rough style utilizes black-and-white contrasts and a dynamic flow through the use of perspectives.

== Biography ==
Maurović was born in the village of Muo (part of Kotor) in the Boka Kotorska in present-day Montenegro (at the time in Austria-Hungary), to a Slovene father (spelled Maurowitch)) and a Croat mother from the Boka Kotorska. After a short stay in Kraków, Poland, he and his family moved to Dubrovnik, near his birthplace, where he attended elementary and secondary school.

Following the recommendation of the writer Ivo Vojnović, Andrija Maurović enrolled at the Academy of Fine Arts in Zagreb. At that time, he began illustrating books, weekly and daily newspapers, and working for graphic institutions, booksellers and editors, such as St. Kugli. He came into conflict with the academy's rules, which prevented students from working during their studies. He left the Academy of Fine Arts during his first academic year to focus on his professional work creating illustrations, caricatures, posters, and graphic design. Andrija Maurović's works appeared in publications such as Jutarnji list, Novosti, Koprive, Ženski svijet, and Kulisa.

In 1935, he created his first comic, Vjerenica Mača (The Sword's Fiancée), which was published in the Zagreb newspaper Novosti. In the same year, Maurović co-launched Oko, the first Yugoslav comics magazine.

Maurović also collaborated with Croatian authors and screenplay writers, such as Franjo Fuis. He based his illustrations on literary models such as Alex Tolstoy, Zane Grey, August Šenoa, Jack London, B. Traven, Max Brand, and H. G. Wells.

Maurović designed socialist realist posters. He also painted seascapes and apocalyptic scenes, and worked as a caricaturist, illustrator, and preacher. At a time when pornography was mostly absent from mainstream media, Maurović published a series of drawings alluding to extramarital and marital relations. He also created a number of comic strip heroes and personalities such as Dan, Old Tom-cat, and Radoslav. His works are part of the Sudac Collection.

In the 1960s, a redesigned version of the Dubrovnik chess set by Andrija Maurović was created and produced in the workshop of Jakopović in Zagreb. Changes in the set's redesign can be observed in the knights, with simplified carving, and the queens, having only five cuts in the crown as opposed to the original eleven. Bobby Fischer was often filmed and photographed with his own 1970 Dubrovnik chess set, which was later stolen.

Towards the end of his life, he "gave up working on mainstream comics and turned to an ascetic lifestyle that excluded running water and electricity, painting large oil paintings with apocalyptic motifs and hardcore porn comics for his own pleasure". For Maurović, candaulism was said to be "not an individual excess but an obsession that preoccupies all his pornographic comics. Only the men to which the husband exposes his wife differ – but it is desirable that they should be as ugly, wild, dirty, proscribed, and socially unacceptable as possible, to make the transgression even greater and the humiliation even more powerful. This further emphasizes the power of the sexual instinct that drives the actors and crushes prohibition."

Maurović died in Zagreb and was buried in the Mirogoj Cemetery. It is speculated that Maurović's comic heroes promoted the victory of justice and freedom, and that Maurović lived by this ideology as well.

== Stari Mačak ==
Maurović began his best-known series, centered around the character Stari Mačak (Old Tom-cat), in 1937. The series and its characters were created in collaboration with journalist Franjo Fuis, who, detesting adaptations, opted instead for an original series. The character "Stari Mačak" was first introduced in Gospodar Zlatnih Bregova (Master of the Golden Hills, January 1937) as an elderly wanderer who lost his memories after a tragic accident. The work was first serialized in the magazine "Novosti", and subsequently in the comics magazine "Mickey Strip" under the name Crni Jahač (Dark Rider, 1938). He is not a typical Western hero, as Maurović sought inspiration from his daily acquaintances, basing Stari Mačak on a construction worker he frequently met at a pub on Ilica street.

This was quickly followed by Sablast Zelenih Močvara (Spook of the Green Swamps), where Stari Mačak was joined by wandering poet Polagana Smrt (Slow Death) along with his parrot Penelope and his horse Tulip. Posljednja pustolovina Starog Mačka (Old Cat's Last Adventure) was published in volumes from November 1 to December 27, 1937.

== Legacy ==
Comic book historians Zdravko Zupan and Slavko Draginčić praised Maurović for his ability to develop visual dynamics, with particular emphasis on black and white contrasting. Art historian Vera Horvat Pintarić wrote about his Interwar Period comic book work:

Presenting himself in all these works as a sovereign ruler of black and white surfaces, impressive visual dynamics and utilizing movie-technique views, Maurović manages to achieve that which was not to be previously seen even globally.

Timothy O. Benson described him as a superb master of the art of cartoon, stating that "intensified interest in mass communications have resulted in reconsideration of his entire oeuvre". Maurović ignored global trends of comics in the 30s, creating his own distinct style and utilizing a great variety of themes for his opus. This involved both the use of monochromatic sfumato, and playing with perspectives and scenes. It is for these reasons that he is generally considered to be the father of comic books and illustration in the territories of the former Yugoslavia, and its most popular author.

Goran Sudžuka cited him as his main influence, praising him as "A truly unique figure in the whole comic industry, not just in Croatia.". The comic strip club in Kotor bears his name.

== Bibliography ==
Starting with his first comic strip Bride of the Sword in 1935, he drew a great number of comics in a relatively short time (1935–1940), including:

- Empress of the Netherworld
- Mistress from Mars (after Alex Tolstoy)
- Three Men in the Dark (after Max Brand)
- The Seventh Victim (after Max Brand)
- The Black Rider
- Plague's Ship
- Master of the Golden Hills
- Ghost of the Green Swamps
- With Fire and Sword (after Henryk Sienkiewicz)
- Goldsmith's Gold (Zlatarevo zlato), based on the literary work of August Šenoa
- The Gold (after Jack London)
- Gunka Das (after Rudyard Kipling)

Their dramaturgy and morphology show a visible influence of early westernss.

At the time of Second World War, his drawings included:

- The Tomb in the Rainforest
- The Great Migration of the Croats
- Prince Radoslav
- Ahura Mazda on the Nile (after Georg Ebers)
- Golden Island (after Robert Louis Stevenson)
- Tomislav

After the war followed:

- The Mexican (after Jack London)
- The Siege
- The Lone Star Rider (after Zane Grey)
- Riders of The Purple Sage (after Zane Grey)
- Uglomi, the Master of the Cave (after H. G. Wells)
- The Pearl of Evil
- The Girl from Sierra
- The Old Tom-cat's Return
- The Old Tom-cat
- The Witch of Grič (after Marija Jurić Zagorka)
- Beware the Hand from Senj (Čuvaj se senjske ruke), based on the literary work of August Šenoa
