= Branko Šenoa =

Croatian painter (1879–1939)

- Born: 7 August 1879; Zagreb, Austria-Hungary (now Croatia)
- Died: 4 December 1939 (aged 60); Zagreb, Yugoslavia
- Resting place: Mirogoj Cemetery
- Spouse: Nasta Rojc (m. 1910; div. 1925)
- Father: August Šenoa
- Relatives: Milan Šenoa (brother)

Branimir Šenoa (7 August 1879 – 4 December 1939) was a Croatian painter, graphic artist, and art historian.

== Biography ==
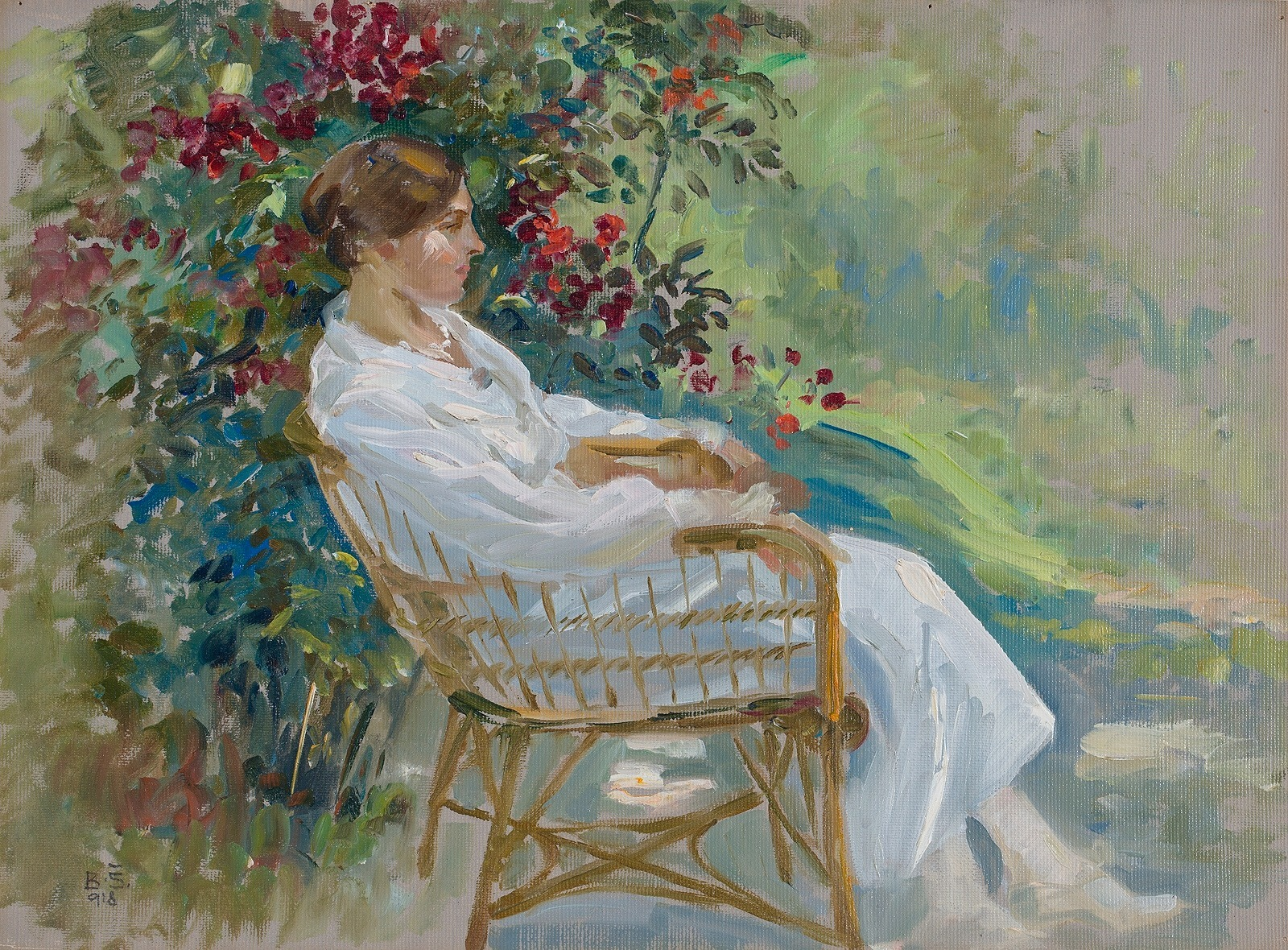
Ženska na vrtu ('Female in the Garden', 1918)

He was born in Zagreb, the son of the prominent writer August Šenoa. In 1910, he married Nasta Rojc with the understanding that the marriage would be in name only. After graduating law and philosophy in Zagreb, he received his PhD in art history in 1912. He attended school of painting by Oton Iveković and a course in graphic design by Menci Clement Crnčić.

He served as the director of the Zagreb Academy of Fine Arts, and held several positions related to cultural heritage and art. He was a corresponding member of the Yugoslav Academy of Sciences and Arts. He died, aged 60, in Zagreb.

He is buried in Mirogoj Cemetery.

As a painter, his work was focused on landscapes and cityscapes in etchings, sceneries, and illustrations.
