= Nasta Rojc =

Croatian painter (1883–1964)

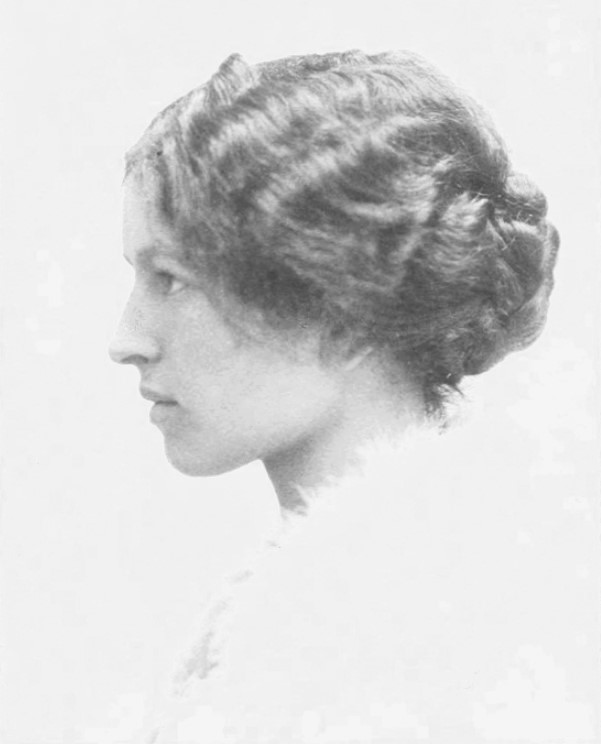
- Portrait by Ludwig Grillich, before 1926
- Born: Jerka Hermina Ljubica Rojc; 6 November 1883; Bjelovar, Kingdom of Croatia-Slavonia, Austria-Hungary
- Died: 6 November 1964 (aged 81); Zagreb, SR Croatia, Yugoslavia
- Other name: Nasta Rojc-Šenoa
- Occupation: Painter
- Years active: 1909–1949
- Partner: Alexandrina Maria Onslow

Jerka Hermina Ljubica Rojc (/rɔɪts/ ROYTS; 6 November 1883 – 6 November 1964), better known as Nasta Rojc, was a Croatian painter.

Born in Bjelovar, she was a sickly child and a misfit. She did not enjoy school or playing with other children, but liked both hunting and horse riding. After she declared in her youth that she was an atheist, her father had her educated in a convent school. Becoming depressed, she was sent to the seaside town of Kraljevica at fifteen, where she met a painter, Branko Šenoa, who inspired her to become an artist. Her father objected, but in exchange for her agreement to learn cooking, he allowed her to attend art school. She studied in Zagreb, Vienna, and Munich, learning to paint, sculpt, and engrave. When her father insisted she marry, Rojc who was a lesbian, entered a lavender marriage with Šenoa, after her father agreed to help her acquire a studio and assist with her living expenses.

From 1909 she exhibited works with the Croatian Art Society in Zagreb and was the first woman to have a solo exhibition at the Salon Ullrich. She participated in numerous exhibitions in the capitals of Eastern Europe until the onset of World War I. During the war she took commissions for portraits and worked on an autobiography. Around the same time, Rojc met a group of lesbians who had worked for the Scottish Women's Hospitals for Foreign Service during the war in Serbia and Sarajevo. After the war, the hospital personnel founded an orphanage in Bajina Bašta. One of them was a British peer, Alexandrina Onslow, who became Rojc's partner.

From 1923, they openly lived as a couple in a house Rojc had designed, which was shared with her husband until his death in 1939. Between 1924 and 1926, Rojc and Onslow lived in Scotland and England, where Rojc had a successful exhibition at the Gieves Art Gallery in London. Returning to Zagreb at the end of 1926, her work was derided by the critics. She exhibited with the Women's International Art Club in London until 1929, and was inspired to found the Klub likovnih umjetnica (Women Artists' Club) with Lina Virant Crnčić to promote the works of women artists. The group held eleven exhibitions between 1928 and 1940, in which she presented works of her own. When World War II broke out, the couple joined the resistance movement. They were reported to the Ustaše, arrested, sent to prison for several months in 1943, and were unable to reacquire their property until after the war ended. Rojc died in 1964, fourteen years after Onslow, with whom she was buried.

Rojc and her work were largely forgotten until the breakup of Yugoslavia. Almost immediately after Croatian independence a retrospective of her work was presented and scholars began evaluating Rojc's two autobiographies, her correspondence within her international lesbian network, and her photographic archive. It is rare that queer history in the region has had tangible documentation and the records that she left are seen as significant for both British and Yugoslavian lesbian history. Her paintings are held in many public and private collections including the Modern Gallery, Zagreb, the City Museum of Bjelovar, the Josip Kovačić Collection owned by the City of Zagreb, as well as the Croatian National Theater. In 2006 Rojc's likeness was featured on a postage stamp. Historian Leonida Kovač published a book analyzing Rojc's legacy in 2010, recognizing that it was innovative and pushed the boundaries of socio-cultural norms. Numerous retrospective exhibitions of her work have been held throughout Croatia; in 2017, fifty-three of her paintings were exhibited at the Palais Porcia, Vienna.

== Early life and education ==
Jerka Hermina Ljubica Rojc, known as Nasta, was born on 6 November 1883 in Bjelovar, Kingdom of Croatia-Slavonia, Austria-Hungary, to Slava (née Blažić) and Milan Rojc. Her siblings included Slavica, Ljerka, Slava, Vjera, Milan, and Vladimir, although both Slavica and Ljerka died as young children and were buried at the St. Andrew Cemetery of Bjelovar. Milan was a prominent lawyer, politician, and cultural figure who contributed to establishing secondary education in Croatia. Rojc attended elementary school in her home town. She was a sickly child and did not enjoy schooling or playing with other children, but was an avid horsewoman and hunter. After she had declared that she was an atheist, her father sent her to Sacré Coeur (Sacred Heart), an Ursuline monastery school in Graz. Rojc described the period as "torment". Experiencing rejection and little affection from her family, she became depressed and at fifteen was sent to the seaside town of Kraljevica to recuperate. While there she met the painter Branko Šenoa and their friendship spurred her interest in painting. Her father allowed her to return to Bjelovar where she attended the Realgymnasium of Bjelovar for two years, and began studying painting with Josip Hohnjec. In 1901, she took painting lessons under Oton Iveković at his private school in Zagreb. The following year, Rojc moved to Vienna, Austria, and enrolled at the Kunstschule für Frauen und Mädchen (Art School for Women and Girls). She also began taking courses at the photography school located on Köllnerhofgasse. Until 1904, she studied still life and plein-air landscape painting under Tina Blau, Ludwig Michalek, and Hans Tichy.

According to Rojc, her father did not support her desire to become a painter, so her schooling was often interrupted. She agreed to learn to cook provided her father paid for her art courses. While she was in Vienna, her father was appointed to a government post and the family relocated to Zagreb in 1906. The move was traumatic for Rojc, as she was forced to leave behind her horses. In 1907, she enrolled at the München Frauen-Akademie (Munich Women's Academy), where she studied with Adolf Höfer, Angelo Jank, and Heinrich Knirr. Simultaneously, she took lessons at the private school run by Moritz Heymann, where she met Miroslav Kraljević, among other painters who were part of what was known as the Munich Circle. Although she wanted to go to Paris, illness prevented her from doing so. Returning to the Vienna Art School for Women, in 1908 she began to study sculpture, copper engraving, and carving with Ludwig Michalek and Otto König. To continue her chosen career as a painter, Rojc agreed to marry Šenoa in 1910, (Note: The 2009 article on Šenoa in Allgemeines Künstlerlexikon Online gives the marriage date in 1909.) on the condition that her father provided her with adequate living expenses and a studio. The marriage was in name only, as Rojc was a lesbian and had relationships with artist Dora Car and opera soprano Milka Ternina. She also studied anatomy, perspective, portraiture and composition, before completing her studies in 1911 and returning to Zagreb.

== Career ==
=== Early (1909–1923) ===
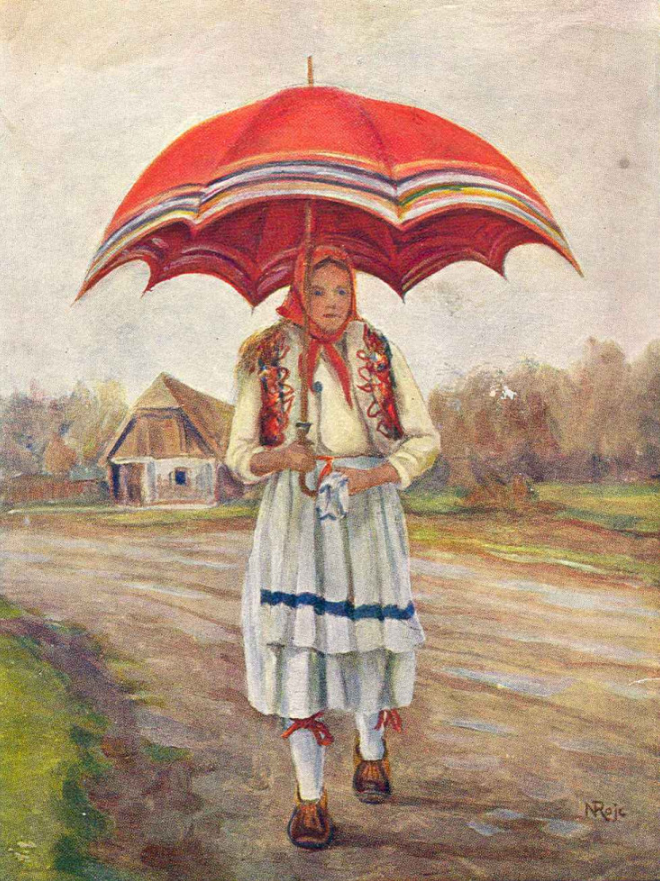
Dobar zaklon (Good Shelter), by Rojc

Rojc began exhibiting in 1909, entering works in the annual of the Hrvatskog društva umjetnosti (Croatian Art Society) in Zagreb, returning in both 1911 and 1913. In 1911, she became the first woman to have a solo exhibition at the Salon Ullrich. In 1912, she participated in the Yugoslav Spring Exhibit in Belgrade and the Vienna Art Salon. In 1913, Rojc illustrated Ivana Brlić-Mažuranić's first edition of the children's novel Čudnovate zgode šegrta Hlapića (The Brave Adventures of Lapitch). She returned to the Vienna Salon that year, and in 1914, organized an exhibition there focused on women's embroidered handicrafts from Petrinja and Zagreb, her own sculptures, and those of fellow sculptor Mila Wod. Her long-range goal was to create a series of exhibitions featuring works from women's folk art associations for Slavic artists in Ljubljana, Lviv, Prague, and other capitals of Eastern Europe. The outbreak of World War I halted her plans and instead she began doing studio work, painting portraits and working on an unpublished autobiography Sjene, svjetlo i mrak (Shadows, Light, and Darkness, 1918–1919). Her first commissioned portrait was of the actress Marija Ružička Strozzi in 1914. Rojc participated in a group exhibition at the Strossmayer Gallery of Old Masters in 1917, and held a solo exhibition in Zagreb in 1918. She also hung works in 1920 and 1921 in the exhibitions of the Lada Association, the first artists' organization to be founded in Belgrade.

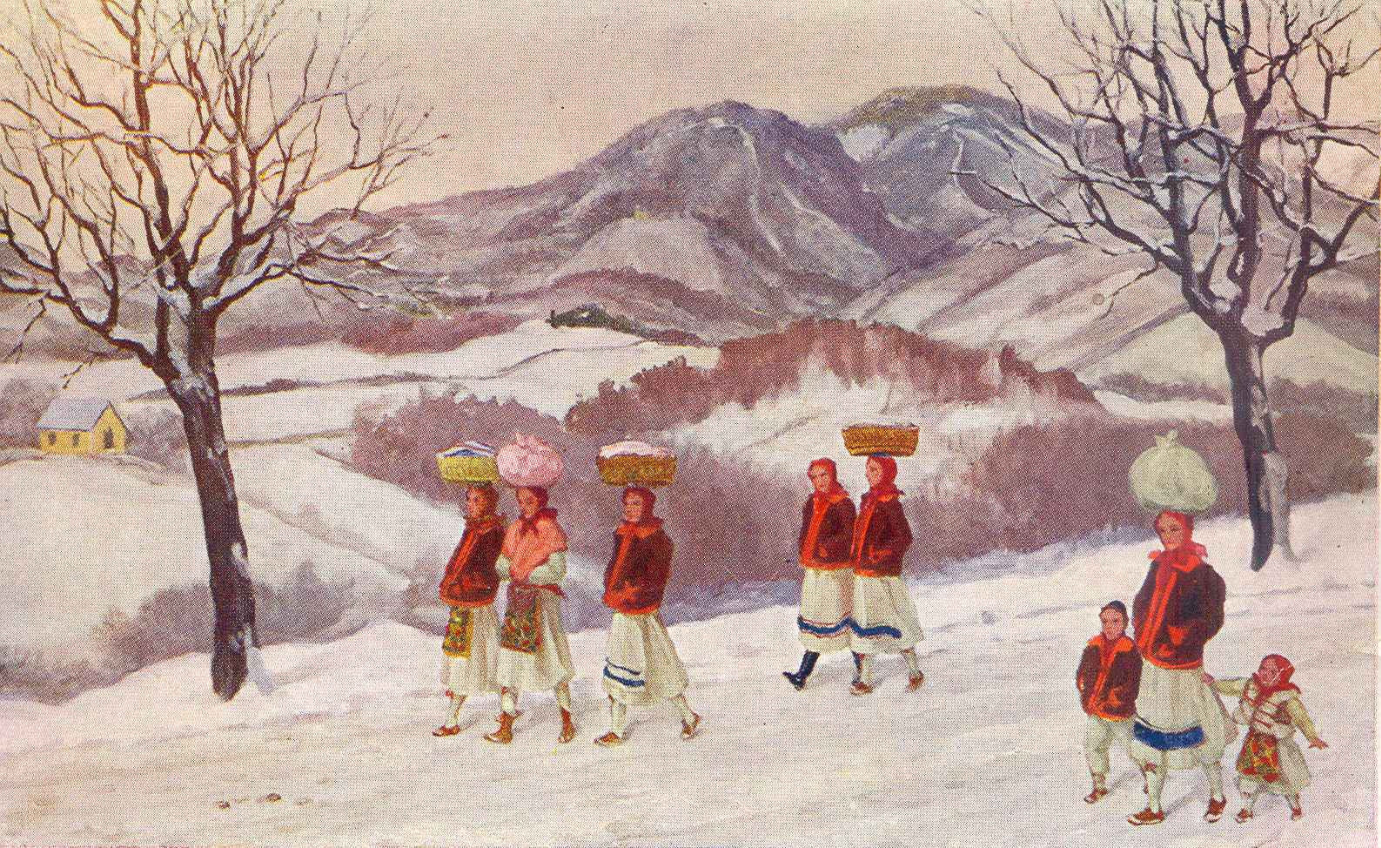
Na cesti (On the road), painting by Rojc

At the time, Rojc focused on both male and female nudes, painting such works as Kupač s leđa u vrtu Hietzing kraj Beča (Bather from Behind in the Garden of Hietzing near Vienna, 1904–05), Molitelj i Ženski akt (Women's Act of Prayer, 1907), Klečeći ženski akt, (Act of Woman Kneeling, 1908) and portraits of friends including Tanne Hernes (1907), Zoe Borelli (1909). She painted numerous self-portraits and became interested in portraying images of the New Woman. Rojc's self-portraits rejected the ideas of traditional femininity, focusing instead on androgyny. They are characterized as having an unusual psychological depth, giving the viewer a sense of the subject's loneliness, seriousness, and secret inner life which was not open to anyone else. According to scholars Vladimir Bjeličić and Dragana Stojanović, her Autoportret s kistom (Self-Portrait with a Brush, 1910), is a challenge to the stereotype of "man-artist-genius", in which Rojc deliberately painted herself in a dark interior to convey her isolation, while holding the paintbrush in her left hand to confirm her non-conformity. She also painted herself dressed in men's clothing, in pieces like Autoportret u lovačkom odijelu (Self-Portrait in a Hunting Suit, 1912) and Ja borac – Ja (Me, the Fighter, 1914). Her initial landscapes presented a mix of neo-romantic and Symbolist painting styles, and were primarily panoramic images of Croatia, as in Putnik (Traveler, 1911), Ljetna oluja (Summer Storm, 1913), and Obala kod Novog (Coast Near Novi, 1914). In this period, she also produced small etchings, typically focused on the theme of sorrow. These included Žena svjetionik (Lighthouse Woman, 1907), Glazba, Agonija i Ex libris Nasta Rojc – Autoakt u raljama mačke (Music, Agony and Bookplate of Nasta Rojc – Self-Actions in the Jaws of a Cat, 1908) and Zagrljaj smrti (Embrace of Death, 1912)

=== War-time relationships ===
During World War I a group of British suffragists, led by the Scottish doctor Elsie Inglis, came to the Balkan peninsula under the auspices of the Scottish Women's Hospitals for Foreign Service. As women were not allowed to serve as military personnel and were restricted to specialties in women and children's health, Inglis organized the Scottish Women's Hospitals to allow women to serve as ambulance drivers, cooks, doctors, nurses, and paramedics at the front. Turned down by the War Office, Inglis negotiated with allied governments and was allowed to establish hospitals, initially in France and in the Kingdom of Serbia. The first unit arrived in Serbia in December 1914 and by the spring of 1915, Evelina Haverfield was appointed as administrator of the unit. In turn, Haverfield brought her partner Vera Holme to organize the ambulance and transport services, overseeing both horses and motorized vehicles. Holme had been involved in theater before the war and was the chauffeur of Emmeline Pankhurst. She and Haverfield had a network of lesbian friends in the Scottish Women's Hospitals service.

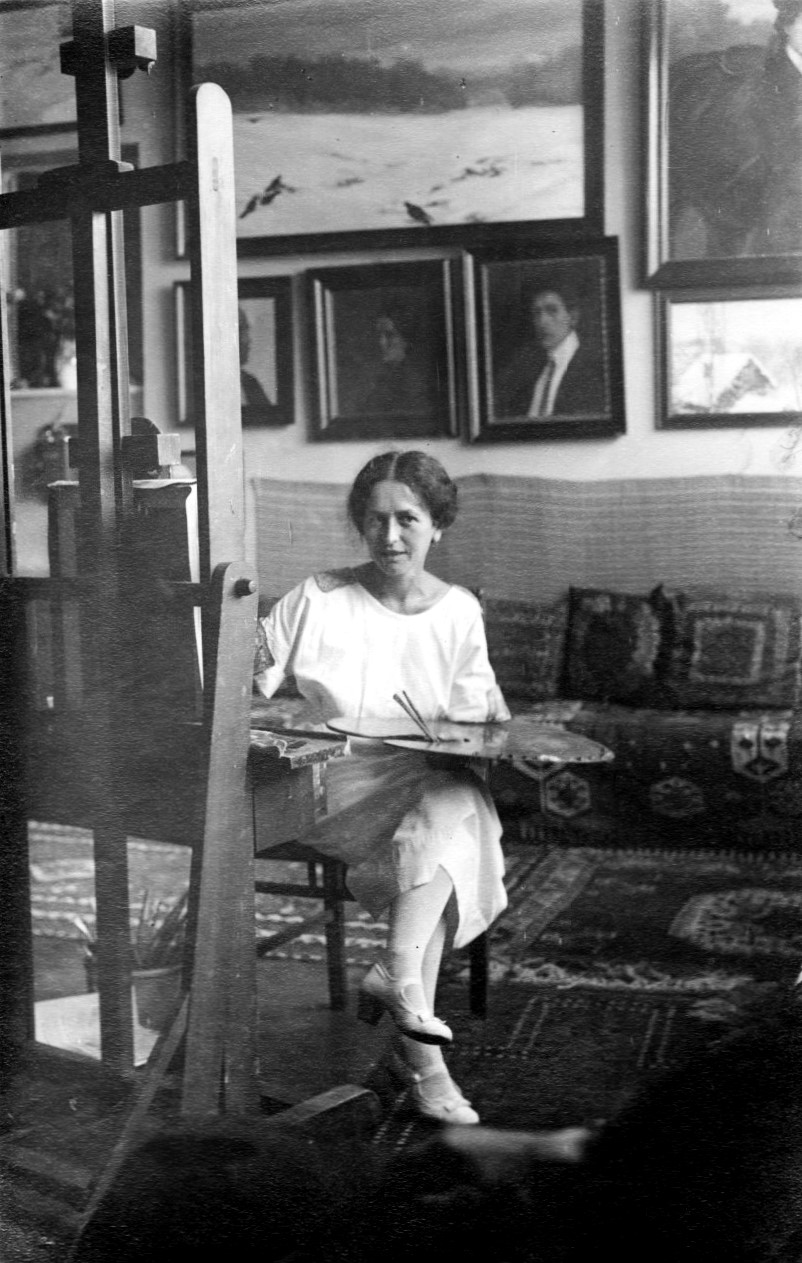
Rojc painting in her studio circa 1925, photo by Onslow

When they were not working, the personnel organized sing-alongs, guessing games, and theatrical performances. When the Germany Army invaded Serbia, the Scottish Women's Hospital was forced to evacuate, but in 1916 and 1917, another unit operated in Dobrudja, Romania, where Alexandrina Onslow was stationed, (Note: Dimitrijević identified the location as Dobrinja, which is a neighborhood of Sarajevo in her 2014 work on Rojc. Her 2017 article with Baker identifies the unit as being stationed in Dobruja, Romania. Cornelis states there were a total of fourteen Scottish Women's Hospital units located in Belgium, Corsica, France, Greece, Macedonia, Malta, Russia, Romania, and Serbia.) after her previous service in Belgium and France. (Note: Onslow served as a driver with the Australian Voluntary Hospital and staff at the Belgian Field Hospital operated by the British Committee of the French Red Cross. She was awarded the Victory Medal and British War Medal for her service.) At the end of the war, Haverfield and Holme returned to Serbia and established an orphanage at Bajina Bašta. Inglis had died in 1917 and Haverfield died three years later. Onslow became the president of the Haverfield Fund for Serbian Children and joined Holme at Bajina Bašta through 1922. As they had during the war, in their off-hours the former workers of the Scottish Women's Hospitals met for social evenings and took sailing excursions in the Mediterranean Sea. On one such excursion in the Adriatic Sea, which probably occurred in 1919, (Note: Josip Kovačić noted that this meeting took place in 1924; however, Dimitrijević and Baker surmise it was earlier because of the notes in Rojc's 1918–1919 autobiography.) Rojc and Onslow met. They began living together as a couple in 1923. Rojc designed and had built a house at 6 Rokov perivoj (lit. 'Roko's Park'), which had more studio space than living areas. They lived openly as a couple there, sharing the home with Rojc's husband until his death in 1939. (Note: Stolz states in his biography of Šenoa that Onslow and Rojc met in England in 1923 and that Rojc and Šenoa divorced in 1925, when she returned to Zagreb. However, this conflicts with Dimitrijević and Baker's timeline that they met on the Adriatic in 1918-1919 and began living together in Zagreb in 1923; Kovačić's and WOW Places editors' statements that they did not return from England until 1926; and Alujević, Nekić, and Balija's reports that they did not divorce.) It served as her art studio and a salon, in which other artists and writers, like Brlić-Mažuranić and Marija Jurić Zagorka gathered.

=== United Kingdom (1924–1926) ===
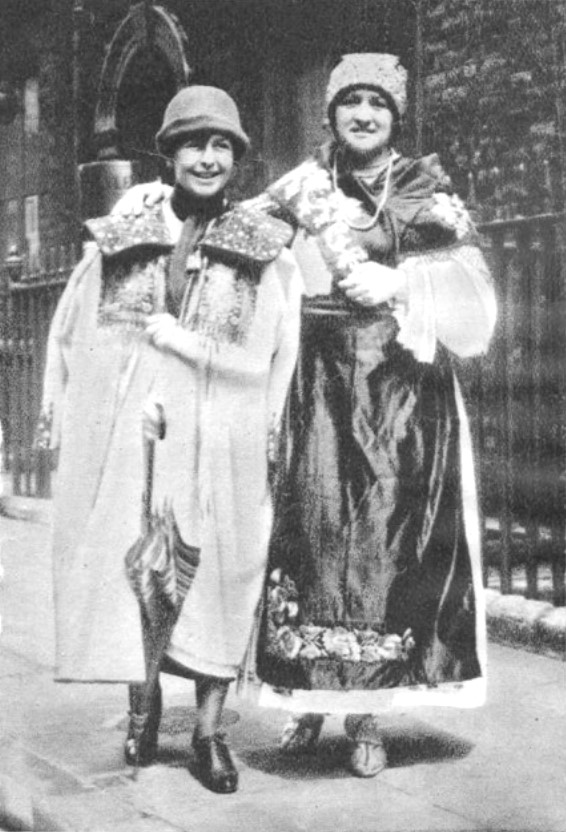
Rojc with opera singer Maja Strozzi-Pečić in London, 1926

In 1924, Rojc and Onslow moved to England, where Rojc painted depictions of the estates of Onslow's friends and landscapes in Scotland. Many of the works from this period were painted in a post-impressionist style. Among the landscapes were Duke of Wellington Park (1924), Loch Tay (1924), and London Park (1924–25). She also painted the first ever image of a car by a Croatian painter in Naš auto u Škotskoj (Our Car in Scotland, 1924). In June 1926, she exhibited at the Gieves Art Gallery. A review in The Studio called her landscapes commendable, particularly those with snow scapes, and described them as having "a delicacy of tone adjustment and a truth of effect". According to the reviewer, her portraits and figure studies were more tentative. The success of the exhibition led to an invitation to exhibit the following year with the Women's International Art Club. (Note: WoW Places states the Gieves exhibit occurred in 1924, but all other sources consulted give the year as 1926.)

=== Yugoslavia (1926–1940) ===
The couple returned to Zagreb at the end of 1926 and Rojc exhibited the paintings that had been successful in London in November. The reception was the opposite of her British success, with Croatian critics deriding her work. She accepted the invitation to exhibit with the Women's International Art Club once they agreed to include works by Lina Virant Crnčić and Zdenka Pexidr-Srića and participated in their London annuals in 1927, 1928, and 1929. Inspired by the London art club, Crnčić and Rojc invited fellow artists to form the Klub likovnih umjetnica (Women Artists' Club) in 1927. The first association of women artists in Croatia, it set out to foster all-women exhibitions, promote the development of similar clubs throughout Yugoslavia, and provide public education about art. Proceeds from the exhibitions were used for public lectures.

Approved by the Yugoslav Interior Affairs Ministry in November, the club organized its first exhibition in 1928 at the Art Pavilion, Zagreb. Once again Croatian critics publishing reviews in Narodne novine and other media wrote scathing and misogynistic critiques not only about the exhibits, which they qualified as outdated and not serious art, but about how the works and participants were selected. Rojc wrote a reply which was published in Ženské listy (Women's Pages) countering that the exhibition was organized through a collaborative and respectful process, using a modern method instead of obsolete hierarchical structures and rules. She exhibited at each of the eleven events held by the Women Artists' Club between 1928 and 1940. Because of her openly lesbian relationship, Rojc refused to serve as president of the Women Artists' Club, fearing that it might impact the club's reputation or result in negative publicity. Instead, she served as the organization's secretary.

Onslow, whose family were British peers, used her influence with nobles, including Maria of Yugoslavia, to garner patrons for the club, organize international networks, and secure commissioned works for Rojc, one of which was a portrait of King Alexander I. Rojc was also involved with the Little Entente of Women and helped to organize an exhibition in 1938 to show the works of Eastern European women artists in Zagreb. Simultaneously with the event, a retrospective of Croatian women artists who had painted between 1800 and 1914 was set up next to the main exhibit in the Art Pavilion. Rojc was the youngest of the Croatian painters, who included Marija Strümer Bedeković and Slava Raškaj. That year, the Women Artists' Club also hosted a solo exhibition of Rojc and another for the Austrian painter Trude Waehner.

By the end of the 1920s, Rojc's work focused more on nationalistic expression, with landscapes depicting romantic vistas and villages. She also began painting still lifes and animal portraits. Drawing on Dadist and New Objectivity traditions, her 1928 work Naše doba (Our Age) was a social commentary on class, gender, ideology, and race. That year she also made a bronze sculpture, Seljak i Seljanka (Peasant Man and Woman, 1928) and a wood carving, Vjetar (Wind, 1928). Representative of her work in this period are Zima s gavranima (Winter with Ravens, 1926), Moje ruže (My Roses, 1934), Zima u Jurjevskoj (Southern Winter, ca. 1935), Otok Prvić (Prvić Island, ca. 1935), Konj u staji (Horse in the Stable, ca. 1936), and Morski pejzaž (Seascape, 1938).

=== Later life (1940–1964) ===
When World War II broke out, Rojc and Onslow joined the resistance movement. They were reported to the Ustaše, arrested, and sent to prison in 1943. Although afraid they would be shot, Rojc berated their guards as "cowards". Both women became ill and were sent to the prison hospital. Unable to find evidence against them, the couple were released after a few months, but could not return to their home until 1945, when some of their property was returned to them. They continued supporting the resistance and opposing the spread of fascism. In her later life, Rojc enjoyed gardening, and in particular tended a large rose garden. She continued to produce art works, such as the bronze, Šestinčani (Sestinians, 1940), and paintings, Vješanje u Dubravi (Hanging in Dubrava, ca. 1945), Portret Nadice (Portrait of Nadica, 1948), and U jeseni (In Autumn, 1949). She also wrote a second autobiography, which she completed about 1949. Onslow died at their home on 2 February 1950. (Note: Croatian sources routinely show Onslow died in 1949, although a few sources show 1946.) Elene Puškarsky served as Rojc's carer in her later years, which were overshadowed by her poverty.

== Death and legacy ==
Rojc died on her birthday in 1964 and was buried beside Onslow in a joint tomb in Mirogoj Cemetery. Five years after her death, a retrospective showing of her work was presented in Bjelovar. Despite her prominence and dedication to civic works, the historian Leonida Kovač stated that Rojc was forgotten and "erased from the history of modern art in Croatia". After her death, Rojc's work was preserved by Puškarsky, and then protected by the collector Josip Kovačić. Along with her house and furnishings, her manuscripts were purchased by the family of the artist Davor Preis, who uses her studio, lives in the house, and cared for Puškarsky until her death.

Almost immediately following the breakup of Yugoslavia, Rojc's writings and those of other Croatian lesbians began to be discussed by scholars, although her autobiographies have not been published. In 2019, plans were underway to publish Rojc's first autobiography with the Miroslav Krleža Institute of Lexicography, when editing was completed by Ana Šeparović. Her photographic albums have been preserved but are not available to the public. Her photographs document women active in the women's suffrage movement in the Balkans, Romania, and Serbia from the late Belle Époque to the interwar period. They also provide insight into women's other political activities and lesbian history in Britain and Yugoslavia in the era. Similarly, her correspondence with Holme, which took place over decades, provides tangible proof of queer history in the region and has offered scholars clues to historic terminology and codes used by lesbians in their relationships. Scholars Catherine Baker and Olga Dimitrijević said that analyzing the letters also has the potential to change what is known about British lesbians in the period. In 2006, a postage stamp designed by Danijel Popović was released, bearing Rojc's image.

Rojc's paintings, Autoportreta s lovačkom puškom (Self-Portrait with a Hunting Rifle) and Autoportreta s konjem (Self-Portrait with a Horse) are owned by the Modern Gallery, Zagreb. Other works are held by the City Museum of Bjelovar, in the Josip Kovačić Collection owned by the City of Zagreb, and in the Croatian National Theater of Zagreb, as well as in the private Kovačić-Mihočinec Collection, among others. A retrospective of her work was assembled in the mid-1990s by Đurđa Petravić Klaić, and another at the Art Pavilion in 2004. Kovač published Anonimalia: normativni diskurzi i samoreprezentacija umjetnica 20. stoljeća (Anonymalia: Normative Discourses and Self-Representation of 20th Century Artists) in 2010, in which she confirmed Rojc as one of the Munich Circle, recaptured her place as an important Croatian painter, and evaluated the avant-garde elements of her works.

In 2014, on the fiftieth anniversary of her death, her body of work was featured at the Art Pavilion and then toured at the Varaždin City Museum and the Dubrovnik Art Gallery. The golden jubilee featured over a hundred works painted from 1902 to 1949. Many of the predominantly oil paintings in the exhibit had been presumed lost until assembled by curator Jasminke Poklečki Stošić of the Art Pavilion. Stošić worked for two years to locate pieces in private collections in Croatia and abroad, many of which had never been exhibited. A smaller collection of fifty-three paintings was exhibited at the Palais Porcia, Vienna between March and April 2017 in honor of the Year of Croatian Culture and Art in Austria festivities. In 2019, the Museum of Contemporary Art, Zagreb, dedicated a month-long exhibit, Nasta Rojc: Me, the Fighter, to her, which featured a biographical collage with text created by Kovač and art by Ana Mušćet. Kovač, an art historian, studied the unpublished autobiography from the end of World War I and letters written by Rojc, held in private collections, and then invited graduate student Mušćet to illustrate the text. In 2020, in the first all-woman exhibition held in Croatia since its independence, her works were featured, along with those of other Croatian painters, in a two-month long show at the Art Pavilion. Rojc's artistic work is now recognized for its early modernist approach. Not content to merely replicate what she saw, she produced works actively questioning and redefining socio-cultural norms. She is widely acknowledged to be one of the most significant Croatian painters of the early twentieth century.
