= Muo =

Muo Муо
- Village
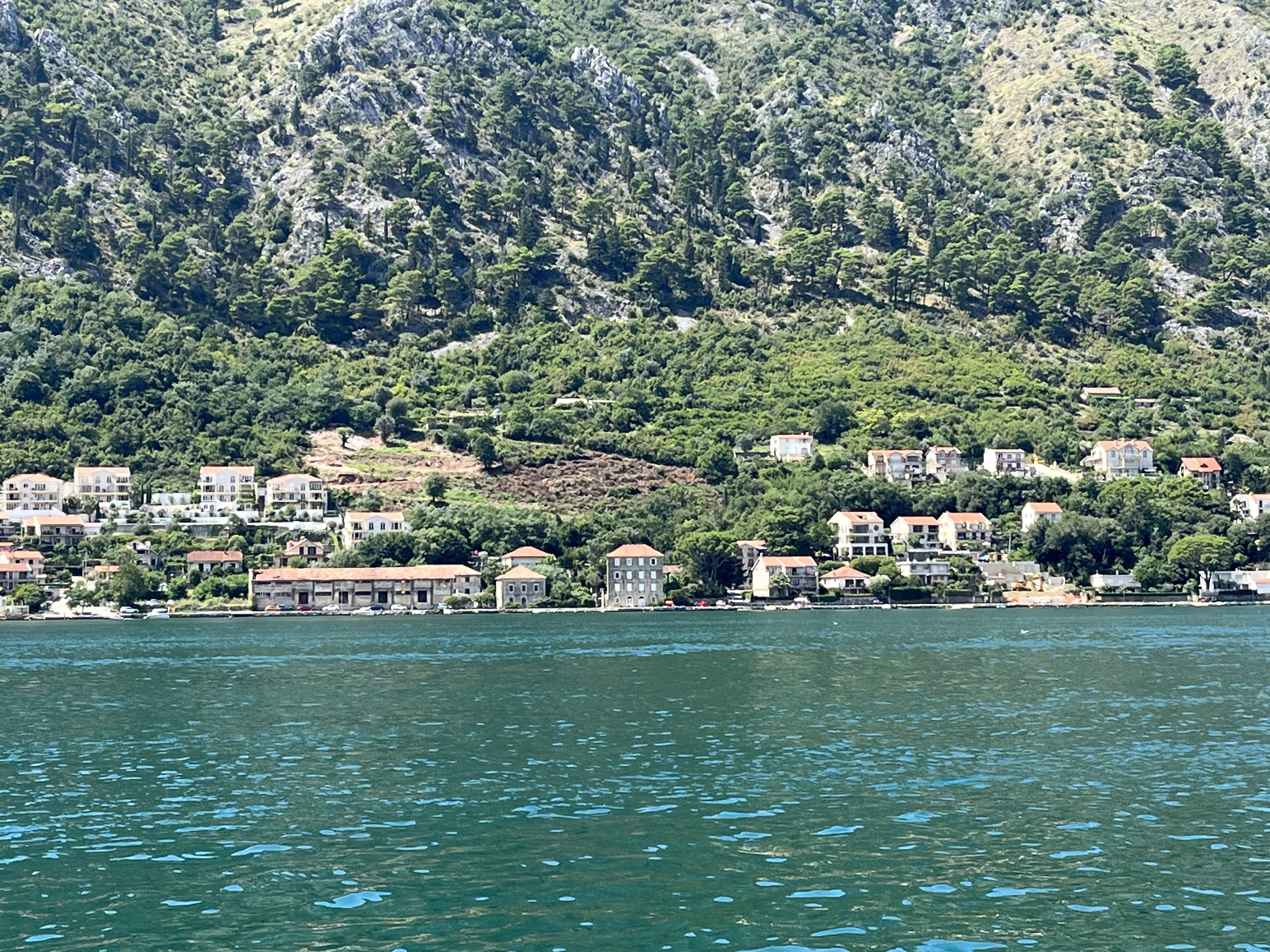

- Location within Montenegro
- Coordinates: 42.430398°N 18.758311°E
- Country: Montenegro
- Region: Coastal
- Municipality: Kotor

Population (2011)
  - Total: 619
- Time zone: UTC+1 (CET)
  - Summer (DST): UTC+2 (CEST)

Muo (Montenegrin: Муо) is a village in the municipality of Kotor, Montenegro.

== Demographics ==
According to the 2011 census, its population was 619.

Ethnicity in 2011
Ethnicity	Number	Percentage
Montenegrins	311	50.2%
Serbs	130	21.0%
Croats	115	18.6%
other/undeclared	63	10.2%
Total	619	100%
