= Marija Ujević-Galetović =

Croatian sculptor (1933–2023)

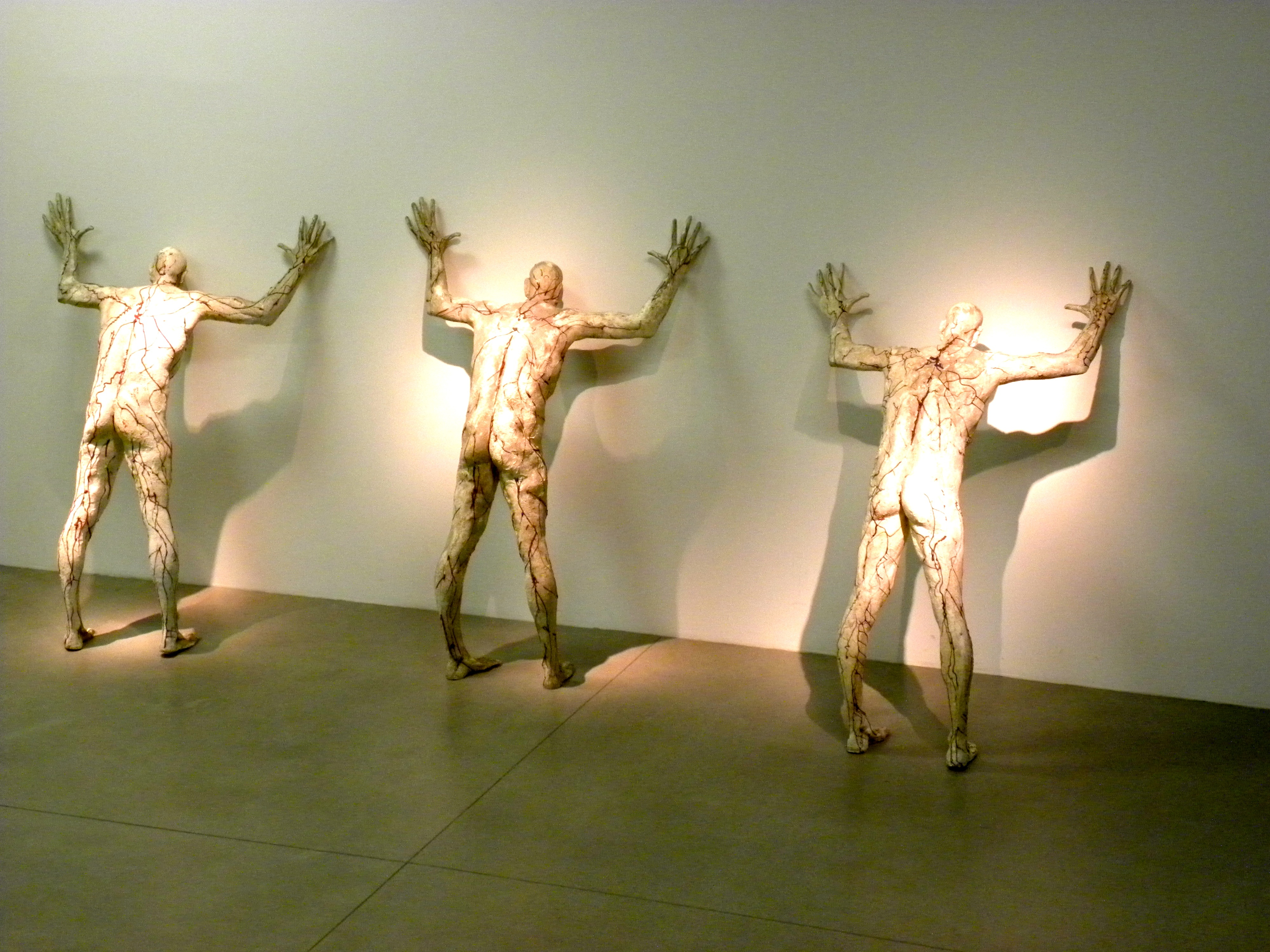
Target II (1981), at MSU

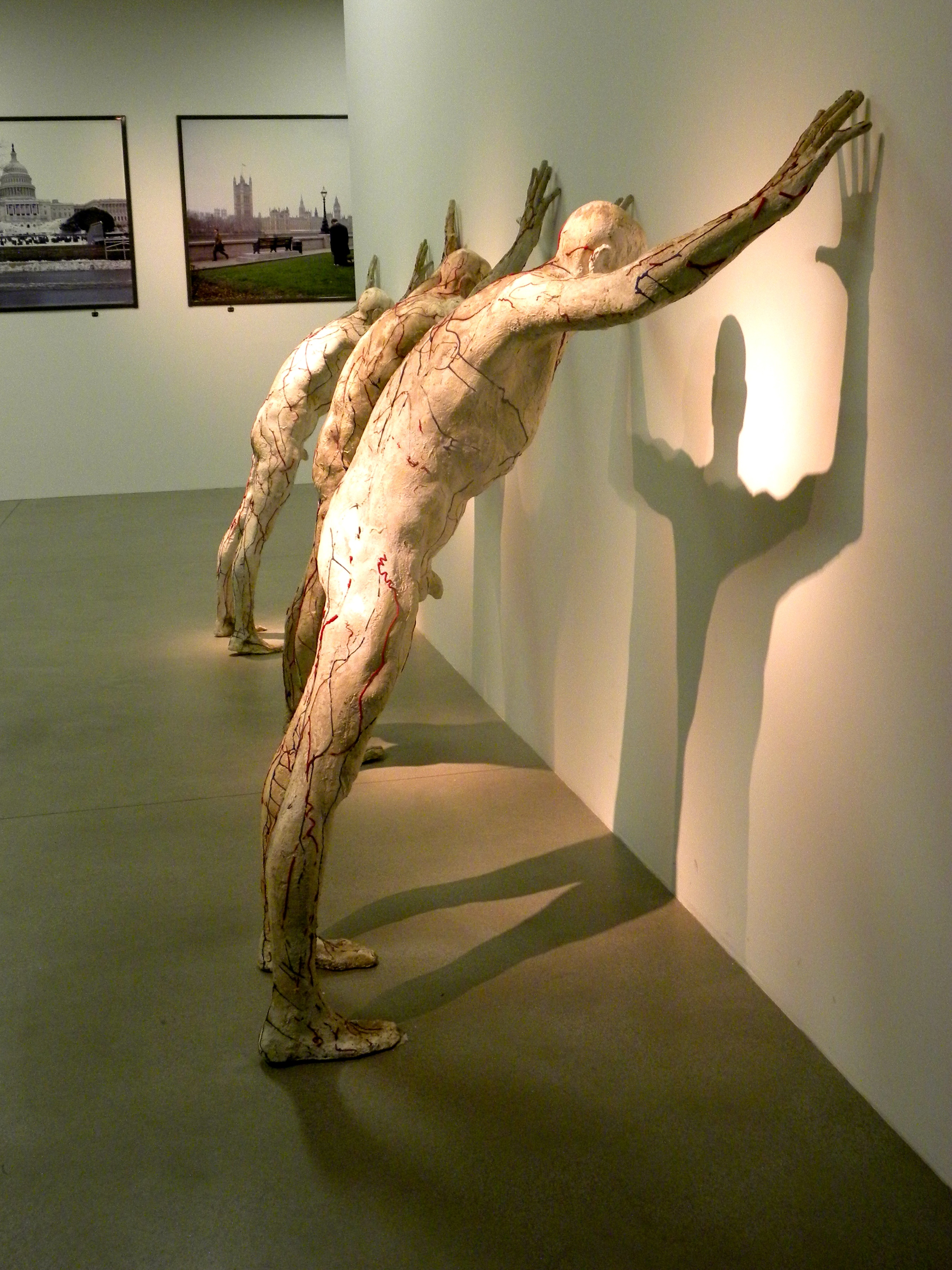
Target II (1981), lateral view.

Marija Ujević Galetović (20 October 1933 – 13 March 2023) was a Croatian sculptor and painter. She lived and worked in Zagreb.

== Work and artistic career ==
Stations of the Cross at Old Town of Sinj

Ujević-Galetović's work included portraits and figures. She studied sculpture at the Central School of Art and Design in London. Since 1987 she had been teaching at the Academy of Fine Arts, University of Zagreb, where she was appointed full professor in 1995. She was also an active member of the Croatian Academy of Sciences and Arts. She was the creator of numerous outdoor and indoor public sculptures located in places such as Virovitica, Vrsar, Zagreb, Marija Bistrica, Sinj, Slavonski Brod, Krk, Cres, Rijeka, Osijek, Labin, Visoko, Bihać, and Novi Sad. Some of her notable public sculptures include the Miroslav Krleža monument in Osijek, the Miroslav Krleža monument in Zagreb, the August Šenoa monument in Zagreb, the sculpture Runner on the Sava River embankment in Zagreb, the Frane Petrić monument in Cres, the Jakov Gotovac monument in Osor, and the Sterija Popović monument in Novi Sad.

Ujević-Galetović had many solo exhibitions in Croatia and abroad, including exhibitions at Gallery Forum (Zagreb, 1980, 1992), Gallery Sebastian (Dubrovnik, 1981), Gallery Sebastian (Belgrade, 1984), Ex Granai della Repubblica a Zitelle (Venice, 1991), Académie de France à Rome in the Villa Medicis (Rome, 1991), HDLU (Croatian Association of Artists, Zagreb, 2005), the Croatian Embassy in Rome (Rome, 2009), and Gallery Močibob (Zagreb 2010).

== Awards ==
- Award for the Seljačka buna (Peasant Uprising) Monument Proposal (Zagreb, 1970)
- Award for the Kozara Monument Proposal (Sarajevo, 1971)
- First Prize for the August Cesarec Monument Proposal (Zagreb, 1973)
- Realization Award for the Miroslava Krleža monument
- Zagreb Salon Award (Zagreb, 1982)
- Croatian Sculpture Triennial Award (Zagreb, 1986)
- Award for the August Šenoa Monument (Zagreb, 1987)
- City of Zagreb Award (Zagreb, 1989)
- Zagreb Salon Award (Zagreb, 1990)

== Published works on Marija Ujević Galetović ==
- Banov, Ivo Šimat, Marija Ujević Galetović (Kontura, 2007).
