= Ivo Kerdić =

- Born: 19 May 1881; Davor, Austria-Hungary
- Died: 27 October 1953 (aged 72); Zagreb, Yugoslavia
- Education: Vienna, Paris
- Known for: sculpture, metalwork

Ivo Kerdić (19 May 1881 – 27 October 1953) was a Croatian sculptor, best known for his metalwork and medallions.

== Biography ==
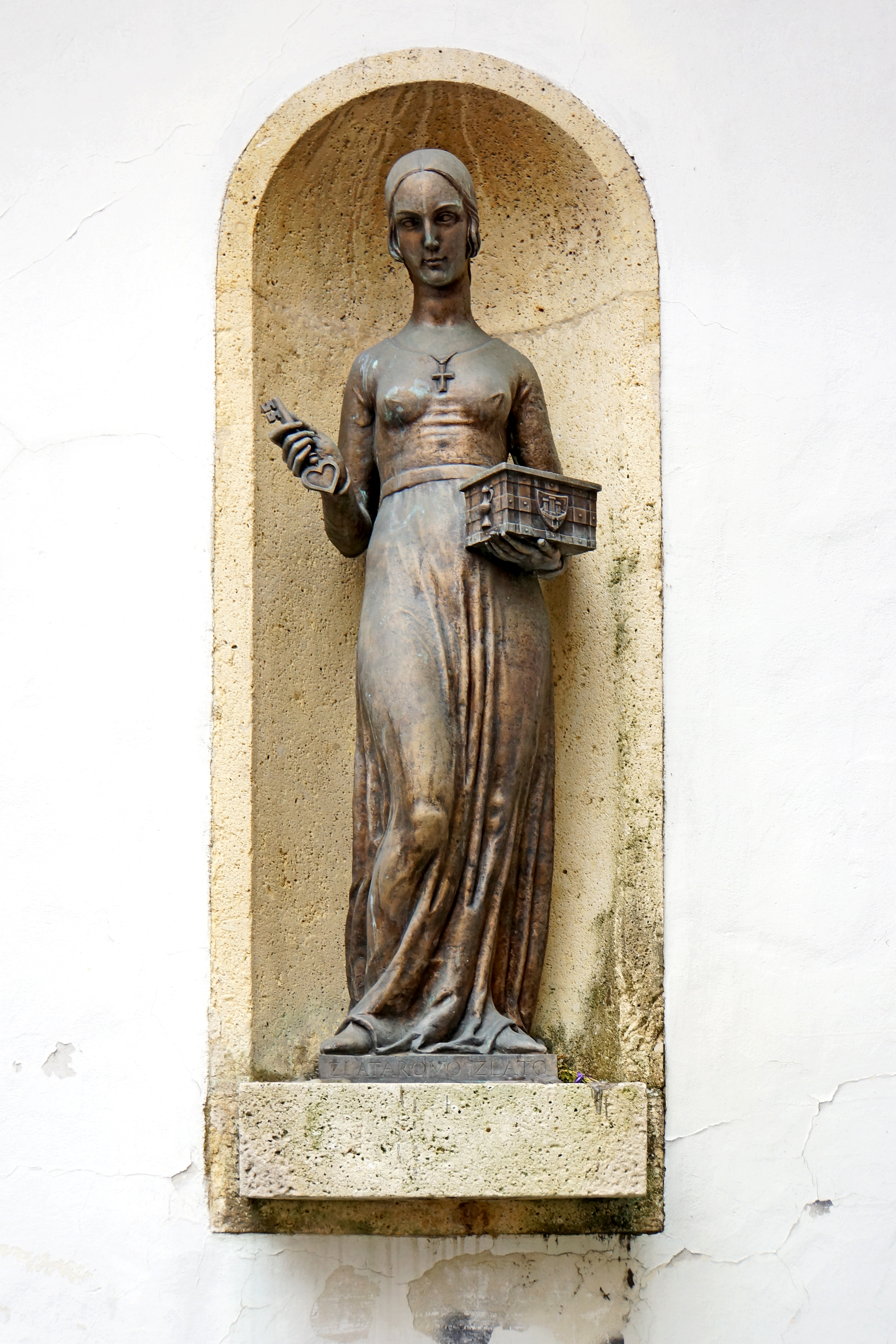
Dora Krupićeva, Stone Gate

Ivo Kerdić was born on 19 May 1881 in Davor in Austria-Hungary (today Croatia), a small village near Slavonski Brod, at that time in Austria-Hungary. The son of a wood merchant, he spent 4 years in elementary school, before going to Zagreb to learn the trade of locksmith in the school for artisans. In 1900, he went to Paris, where he worked during the day, and studied applied art in the evenings, learning engraving. He returned home on the death of his father, one year later. Not having the funds to resume his studies in Paris, in 1902 Kerdić went to Vienna, where he worked at the Gillar Bronze Factory, rising to foreman.

Kerdić returned to Zagreb in 1913, where he took up a position as a lecturer at the College of Arts and Crafts. He pioneered bronze casting at the Academy of Fine Arts, where he taught metalworking from 1923 to 1947.

Kerdić died in Zagreb on 27 October 1953.

== Legacy ==
Kerdić's work included items of applied art, portraits and figurative compositions. Examples of his sculptures can be seen in the main and side altar of the church of St Blaze in Zagreb, the altar of St Nicolas Tavelica in the church of St Cyril and Methodius in Jerusalem. In the Zagreb area, on the Miramarska road is a crucifix by Kerdic.

Although he used all kinds of different media in his sculpture, Kerdić is best known for his metalwork. he worked primarily as a medallist and is considered one of the leading exponents of his time. Kerdić created the chain of office for the Rector of Zagreb University, and the chain for the Grand Master of the Brethren of the Christian Dragon. He was responsible for creating medals for the Independent State of Croatia, such as the Crown of King Zvonimir medal, and the Ante Pavelic medal for outstanding bravery.

Examples of Ivo Kerdić's medals and medallions can be seen in the Numismatic collection of the Archaeological Museum in Zagreb, which consists of about 160 works of the artist, dating from 1911 onwards.

The Modern Gallery in Zagreb has a larger collection of Kerdić's works: a total of 625 original works including medals, plaques, badges, award medals, coins and sculptures dating between 1905 and 1953. His work contains a glimpse of Zagreb and Croatian public life of the time, with its famous personalities and political themes.

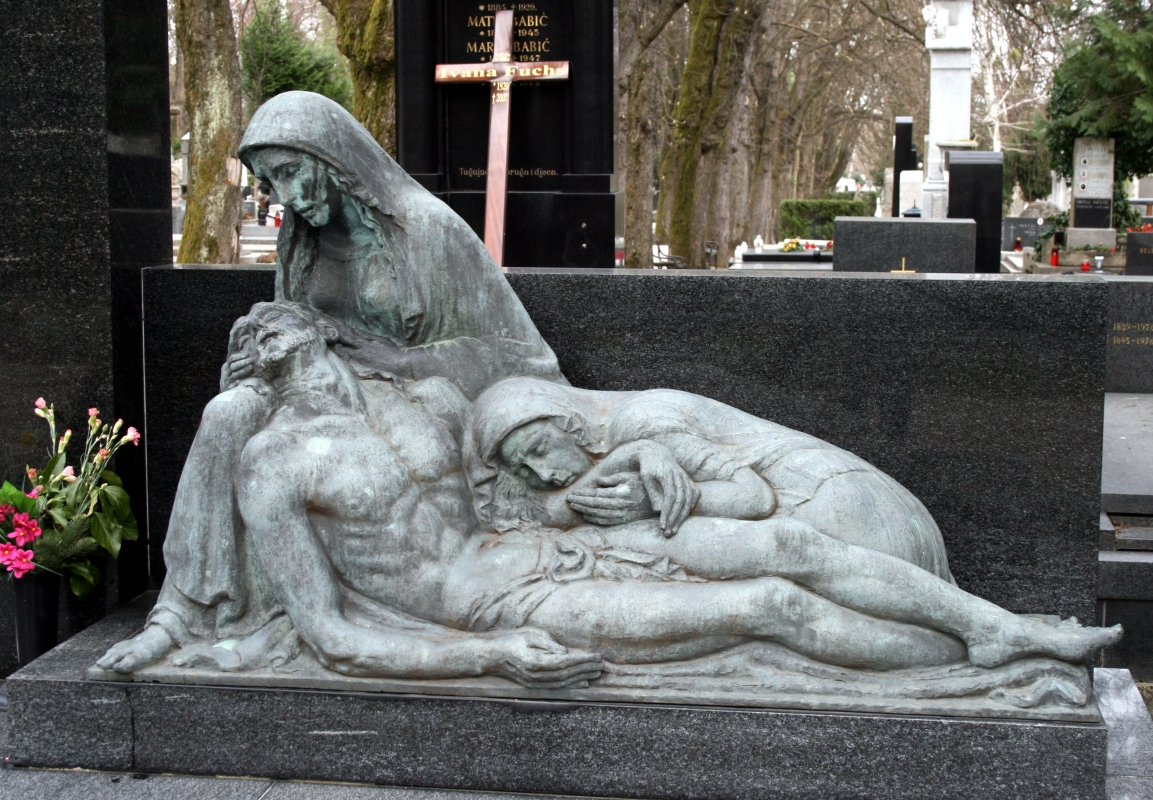
Work by Ivo Kerdić in the Mirogoj cemetery, Zagreb

== Exhibitions ==
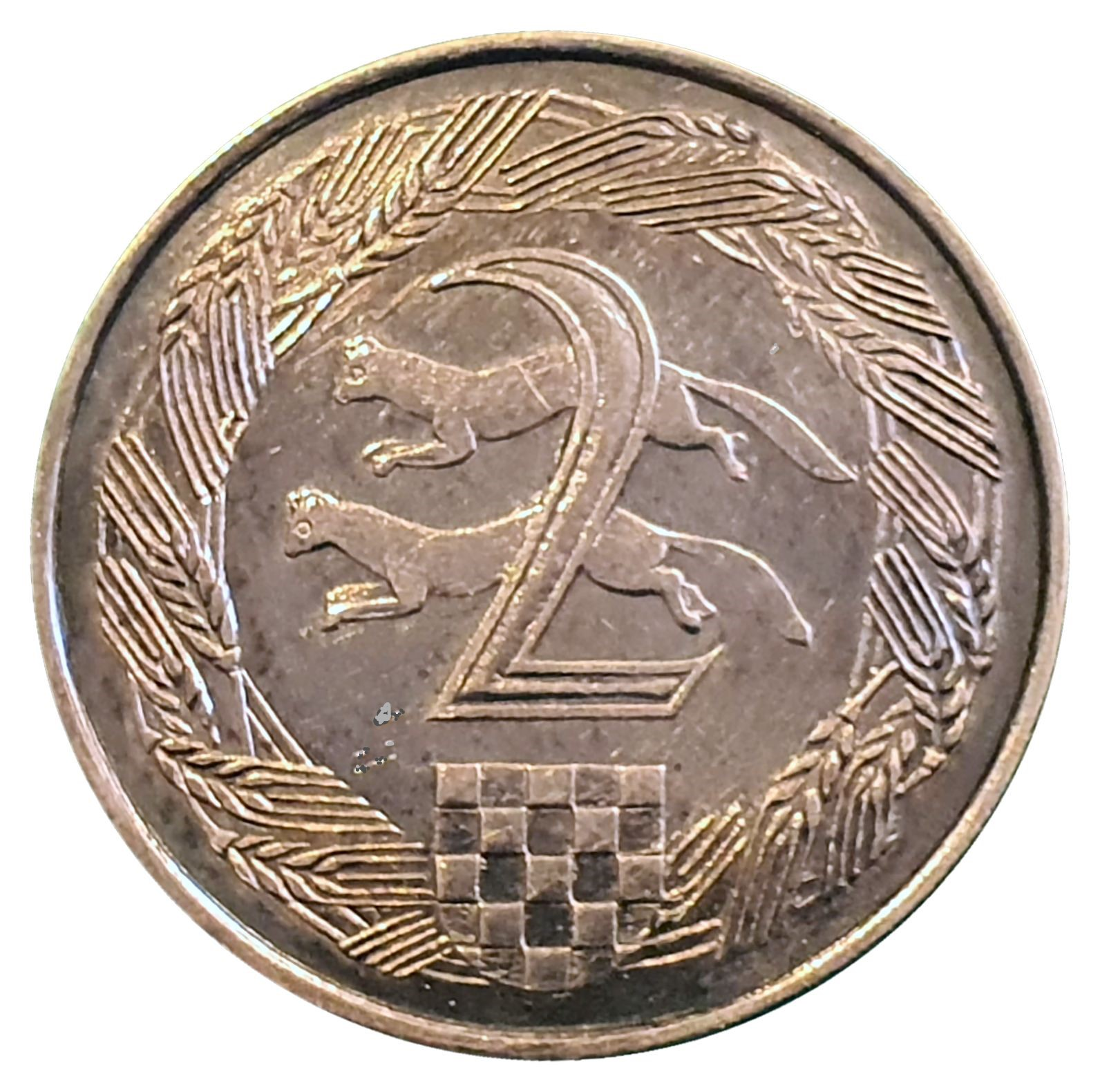
Proposal (unexcapted) of the design of 2 kuna coin, 1941.

=== Solo exhibitions ===
Recent exhibitions of his work include:

- 2011 Ivo Kerdić – Celebrating the 130th anniversary since the birth of the sculptor, Modern Gallery, Zagreb
- 2004 Ivo Kerdic works from the permanent collection, Archaeological Museum of Zagreb

=== Group exhibitions ===
- 1931 Belfast Museum and Art Gallery Exhibition of Yugoslav Paintings and Sculpture
- 1930 Exhibition of Yugoslav Pictures and Sculpture (Glynn Vivian Art Gallery, Swansea), 1930

=== Public collections ===
His work can be found in the following public collections

- Archaeological Museum in Zagreb, Croatia
- Modern Gallery, Zagreb, Croatia
- Glyptotheque Sculpture Museum, Croatian Academy of Sciences and Arts
- Croatian History Museum
