= August Šenoa =

Croatian novelist (1838–1881)

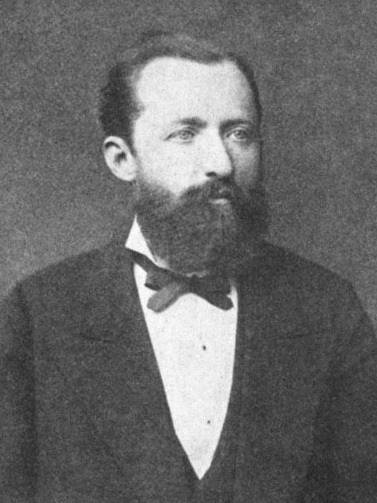
- Šenoa in 1880
- Born: August Ivan Nepomuk Eduard Šenoa; 14 November 1838; Zagreb, Kingdom of Croatia, Austrian Empire
- Died: 13 December 1881 (aged 43); Zagreb, Kingdom of Croatia-Slavonia, Austria-Hungary
- Occupations: novelist, playwright, poet, editor
- Spouse: Slava Ištvanić (m. 1868)
- Children: 6, including Milan and Branko

August Ivan Nepomuk Eduard Šenoa (pronounced [ǎuɡust ʃěːnoa]; originally Schönoa; 14 November 1838 – 13 December 1881) was a Croatian novelist, playwright, poet, and editor. Born to an ethnic German and Slovak family, Šenoa became a key figure in the development of an independent literary tradition in Croatian and shaping the emergence of the urban Croatian identity of Zagreb and its surroundings at a time when Austrian control was weaning. He was a literary transitional figure, who helped bring Croatian literature from Romanticism to Realism and introduced the historical novel to Croatia. He wrote more than ten novels, among which the most notable are: Zlatarovo zlato ('The Goldsmith's Treasure'; 1871), Čuvaj se senjske ruke ('Pirates of Senj', lit. 'Beware the Hand of Senj'; 1876), Seljačka buna ('The Peasant Revolt'; 1877), and Diogenes (1878).

Šenoa was one of the most popular Croatian novelists in his day, and the author of the popular patriotic song "Živila Hrvatska".

== Biography ==
Šenoa was born in Zagreb on 14 November 1838 to Alois Schönoa, (Note: Alois changed his name twice during his lifetime: from Schöynoha, used by his father, to Schenoha to Schönoa.) an ethnic German from what is now the Czech Republic who worked as a confectioner and pastry chef for Bishop Aleksandar Alagović, who brought him to Zagreb in 1829, and Therese (née Rabacs), a German-speaking Slovak either from Tyrnau or Budapest. August was the oldest of four boys: Teodor (1841–1843); Julije, a playwright and author in his own right (1845–1897); and Aurel, a banker (1847–1913). The family lived in the Vlaška Street when August was born. His mother died giving birth to Aurel in 1847; August was eight years old. Alois never remarried, but raised the three boys alone, with some help from his mother-in-law.

Neither of August's parents ever learned Croatian, which was a perennial source of conflict between Alois and August. Dissatisfied with the introduction of the Croatian language in schools and frustrated by August's refusal to speak German, Alois sent August to a Cistercian gymnasium in Pécs, where he learned Hungarian quickly. When German was reinstated as the scholastic language under the so-called "Bach absolutism", August returned home at his father's behest to finish his gymnasium education in Gornji grad.

While at school, a friend loaned August a copy of Osman, an epic poem by Ivan Gundulić about the conflict with the Ottomans. August found it difficult to understand at first, having to translate it into German and then back into Croatian. Enamored, he began constantly seeking out books in the language, which led him to meet and become friends with Ljudevit Gaj, who allowed him access to his library, just off of St. Mark's Square. The friendship blossomed; Gaj encouraged Šenoa to read and converse in the Croatian language and Šenoa later became a tutor for Gaj's son, Velimir. Despite the enforcement of German in schools, some of his teachers in Zagreb numbered among the Croatian nationalists of the era, including Vjekoslav Babukić, Antun Mažuranić, and Adolfo Veber Tkalčević. Their activism had a strong impact on Šenoa. In 1855, he published his first work, Tears (Croatian: Suze). The following year, he graduated gymnasium and traveled with a friend through Slovenia and Italy, which inspired him to write A Carnation on the Grave of a Poet (Croatian: Karanfil s pjsenikova groba), one of his earliest Pan-Slavist works. These travels and his talent for foreign language inspired Šenoa to seek out a career in diplomacy. He took an entrance exam in order to pursue it, but he was rejected on the grounds of his beliefs and his lack of noble birth.

As a university student, Šenoa studied law in Prague and Zagreb and medicine in Vienna. His time in medicine, however, was short-lived, as he could not stand the sight of human blood while working on live patients. His educational success earned him the financial support of Bishop Josip Juraj Strossmayer, who helped pay for Šenoa's law school with a yearly stipend of 300 forints. During his time in Prague, he learned Czech and published several articles in several Bohemian newspapers, including Osvěta and Zlatá Praha. In 1860, he began writing articles and sending them to Pozor and continued to be published, writing about cultural and political events and advocating for brotherhood between Croats and Serbs. During this time, Šenoa began writing songs in Czech under both the pseudonym Veljko Rabačević and his own name. Notably, while writing for Pozor, he also used the pseudonym Petrica Kerempuh, a reference to the folk hero from northwestern Croatia who ridicules the powerful.

In 1865, Šenoa graduated from the Law Faculty of Prague, but, due to a preoccupation with writing and a loss of interest in the legal profession, failed to pass his qualifying exam. As a result, both Strossmayer, who had promised him a professorship at the University of Zagreb, and his father were infuriated and both cut him off financially. Despite this, Šenoa moved to Vienna again, at the invitation Abel Lukšić, becoming the editor of the magazines Glasonoša ('The Herald') and Slawische Blätter ('Slavic Pages'). The following year, he returned to Zagreb to become a part of the editorial staff for Pozor and contributing articles criticizing the contemporary theater scene, denigrating its lack of Croatian language and poor quality. His pieces earned him the enmity of Dimitrija Demeter.

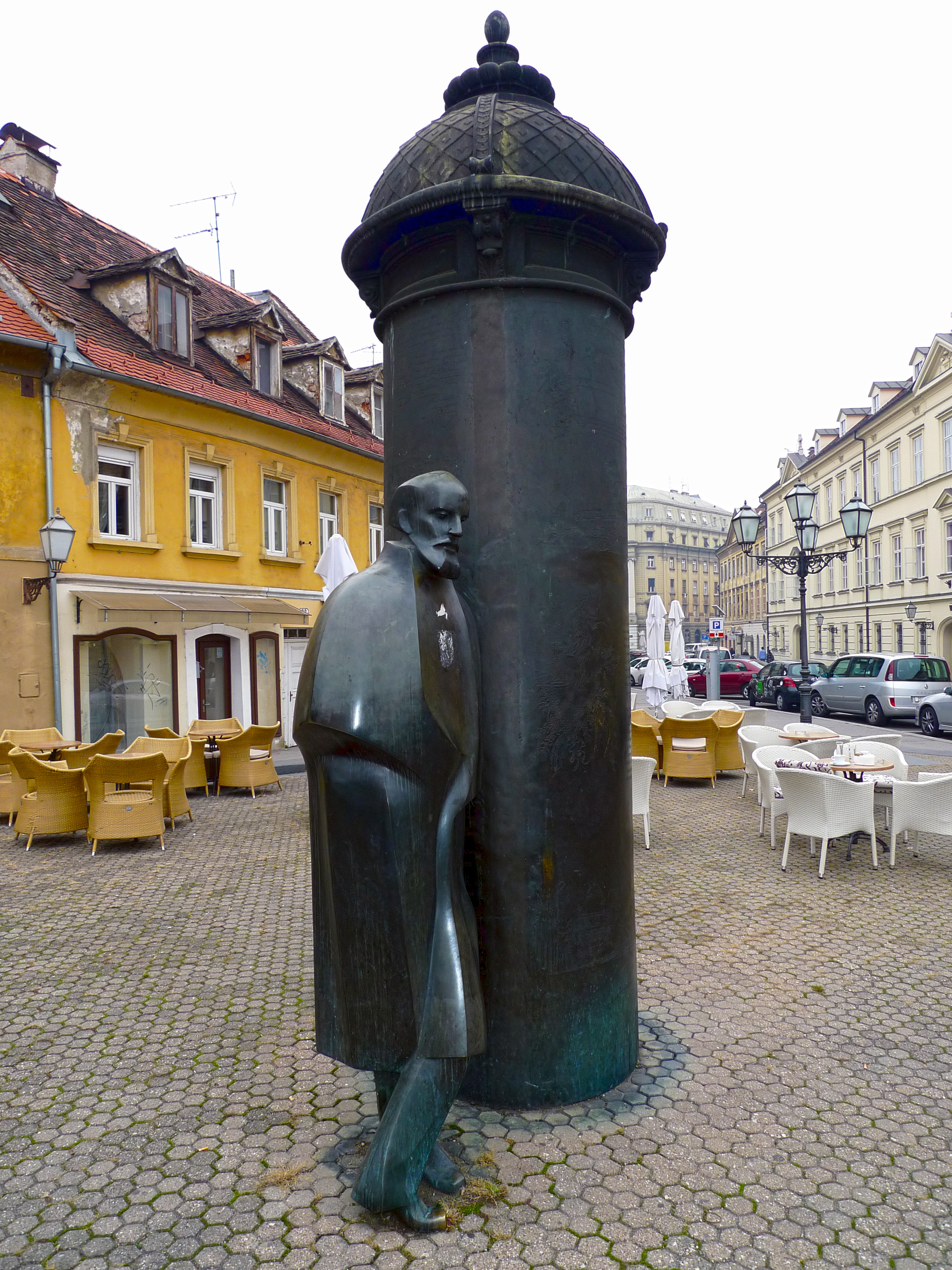
Statue of Šenoa by Marija Ujević-Galetović, located in the same section of the Vlaška Street where the writer lived.

When the editors of Pozor moved to Vienna, Šenoa stayed in Zagreb, having fallen in love with his future wife, Slava Ištvanić, the daughter of a Velika Gorica notary and judge. The couple met at a ball in Velika Gorica on 31 January 1867 and by Easter of the same year, the two were engaged. However, Slava's father refused to officially sanction the marriage until Šenoa got a "real job" which could reliably support the couple. During this period, Šenoa's oeuvre contains a significant number of romantic poems, including O Uskrsu ('On Easter') and Slavici ('To Slavica' (Note: Slavica is a diminutive for the name Slava.)). In March 1868, his comedy Ljubica ('Violet') was published and met with critical and commercial failure. Though later rehabilitated, the piece was, and to some degree still is, considered a particularly heavy-handed satire and even Šenoa's colleague Ivan Perkovac condemned it in Pozor. Shortly thereafter, he became a notary, thereby fulfilling the requirement to marry Slava; her father blessed the marriage and the two were married on 20 June 1868 in Velika Gorica. In August, he became the artistic director of the Croatian National Theater.

At the end of August 1870, he was removed as the artistic director at the HNK, but remained as a playwright. With his help, the theater was able to attract Ivan Zajc to direct an opera. In January 1873, Šenoa became a city senator and was put in charge of four branches: guilds, rural zadruge, social welfare and almshouses, and municipal policing; annually, he and his department handled over 2,500 cases on a salary of 130 forints per month. He worked as a judge on Tuesdays without pay. The job became so overwhelming that he had to leave his position at the theater, though he continued writing at night. In 1875, he attempted a career in politics, but quickly reversed course. In 1877, he became the vice president of Matica hrvatska and, the following year, became the editor of its arts and sciences journal, Vienac. He wrote several pieces for the journal and translated several works from English, Czech, German, and French.

When the 1880 Zagreb earthquake struck, it devastated the entire city. As city senator, he spent all day assessing damage, climbing through collapsed buildings (including attics and basements that had been ravaged by the event), and gave the assessment to the magistrates so they could dictate what to demolish and what to repair. He further took care of victims, by coordinating their care in the barracks-turned-makeshift hospital in Zrinski Square. The work, grief, and exertion took a lasting toll on him. Despite a complicating case of pneumonia, he continued to write his last work, The Curse (Croatian: Kletva), until he could no longer do so, then dictating to his wife and son Milan.

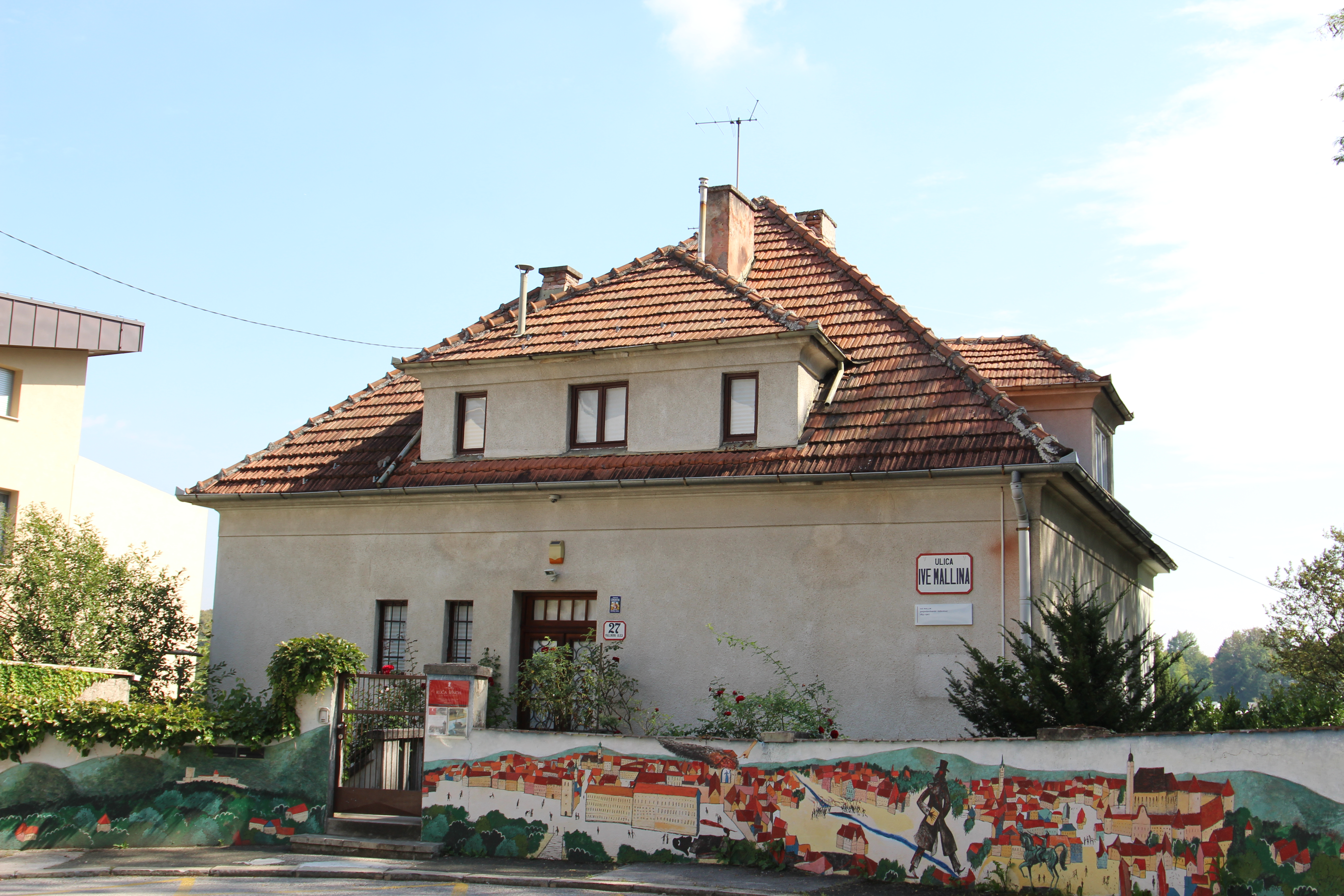
The Šenoa house at Mallinova 27 in Gornji grad, Zagreb holds the family archive. Built by August Šenoa's son Milan in 1929, it was opened as a museum in 2016.

Šenoa died on 13 December 1881. It is unclear exactly what the final cause of death was; he complained of painful, swollen joints and then had a heart attack in June 1881. It is generally accepted that he died of complications from chronic pneumonia and untreated post-streptococcal reactive arthritis. He was buried in Mirogoj Cemetery two days later. His funeral was attended by thousands and included Croatia's most notable figures of the era, including Ivan Mažuranić, Nikola Krestić, and Ivan Kukuljević Sakcinski.

== Work ==
Šenoa's contributions to Croatian literature are often considered peerless; he is called the "father of the Croatian novel" and of Croatian realism. The short period in which he wrote his oeuvre is even called the "Šenoan Age" (Croatian: Šenoino doba). His novels and plays have been framed as embodying the Volksgeist of the era and leaving behind the traditional view of Croatia's precarious position at the center of the crossroads of Europe, flanked by the Orthodox East and Ottoman Turks to the south, leaving Croatia to "[pin] all her hopes upon the House of Habsburg". Rather, he paints the Austro-Hungarian Empire as an enticing Western woman. Tatiana Kuzmic, a professor of the South Slavic languages at Harvard University, notes the following about this characterization:

The adulterous woman of Šenoa's novel [The Goldsmith's Gold], however, fits the mold very well. [...] As a semicolony inhabiting what was perceived by the West as the border between civilization and barbarism, between Christianity and Islam, and eager to prove that it belonged to the former, nineteenth-century Croatia, as Šenoa shows, was particularly vulnerable to the charms of "the deceiving beauty" that was Austria.

His work advocated deeply for a national unity across Yugoslavia by appealing to the shared characteristics rather than their differences. He compared the five Yugoslav peoples – Slovenes, Croats, Serbs, Bosnians, and Montenegrins – to the five fingers of a single hand and appealed his Yugoslavism to the public through common "blood enemies".

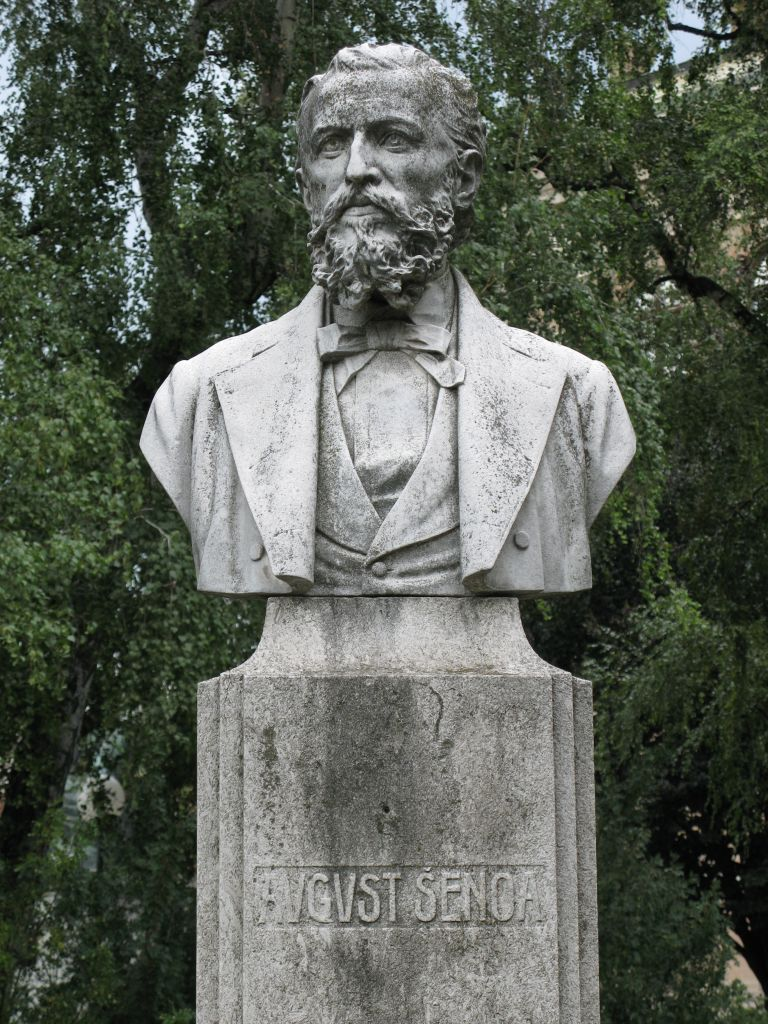
A bust of Šenoa by Rudolf Valdec was placed at the Strossmayer Square in the center of Zagreb in 1913.

Šenoa wrote his novels as distant historical fiction, as critiquing the current political situation could have proved dangerous and opened himself to censorship; both The Goldsmith's Treasure and The Peasant Revolt take place in the 16th century. In an 1874 issue of Vienac, he wrote:

In the historical novel, you must use the analogy between the past and the present to bring the people to an awareness of itself. There are a hundred opportunities for this. In vain is the boasting of the forefathers, the bloody glory of the times gone by is not the task of our historical novel. One must depict all the sins, all the virtues of our past, in order to enable the people to guard from sin, follow virtue. Cicero's saying: Historia vitae magistra (Note: Cf. Historia vitae magistra)—will not find a better place than in the history of the Croats and Serbs. (Note: Original Croatian: U historičnom romanu moraš analogijom medju prošlosti i sadanjosti narod dovesti do spoznanja samoga sebe. Zato ima sto prilika. Pusto hvalisanje praotaca, krvava slava prošlih vremena nije zadaća našeg historičkoga romana. Prikazat valja sve griehe, sve vrline naše minulosti, da se narod uzmogne čuvati grieha, sliediti vrline. Ciceronova rieč: „Historia vitae magistra“ malo će gdje boljeg mjesta naći, no u poviesti Hrvata i Srbalja.)

In his novels, he fused national romanticism characterized by buoyant and inventive language with realistic depictions of the growth of the petite bourgeois class.

His work is known for Cecildemillean scenes and poetic description of oppressed Croatian peasantry and nobility struggling against foreign rule (Venetians, Austrians/Germans and Hungarians) and romanticized period from the 15th to the 18th century. Šenoa is often credited with "creating the Croatian reading public".

== Legacy ==
In 2008, a total of 182 streets in Croatia were named after August Šenoa, making him the person with the seventh most streets in the country named after him.

The Šenoa House is a museum that includes the family collection, as well as a reconstructed August Šenoa study room. Located at 27 Ivo Mallin Street, the house suffered damage in the 2020 Zagreb earthquake, but was later reopened.

== Selected works ==
- Srebrn novac Konstancija III (1879)

== Sources ==
- August Šenoa at the Zagreb City Museum
