= Marija Ružička Strozzi =

Croatian actress (1850–1937)

Marchioness Marija Ružička Strozzi
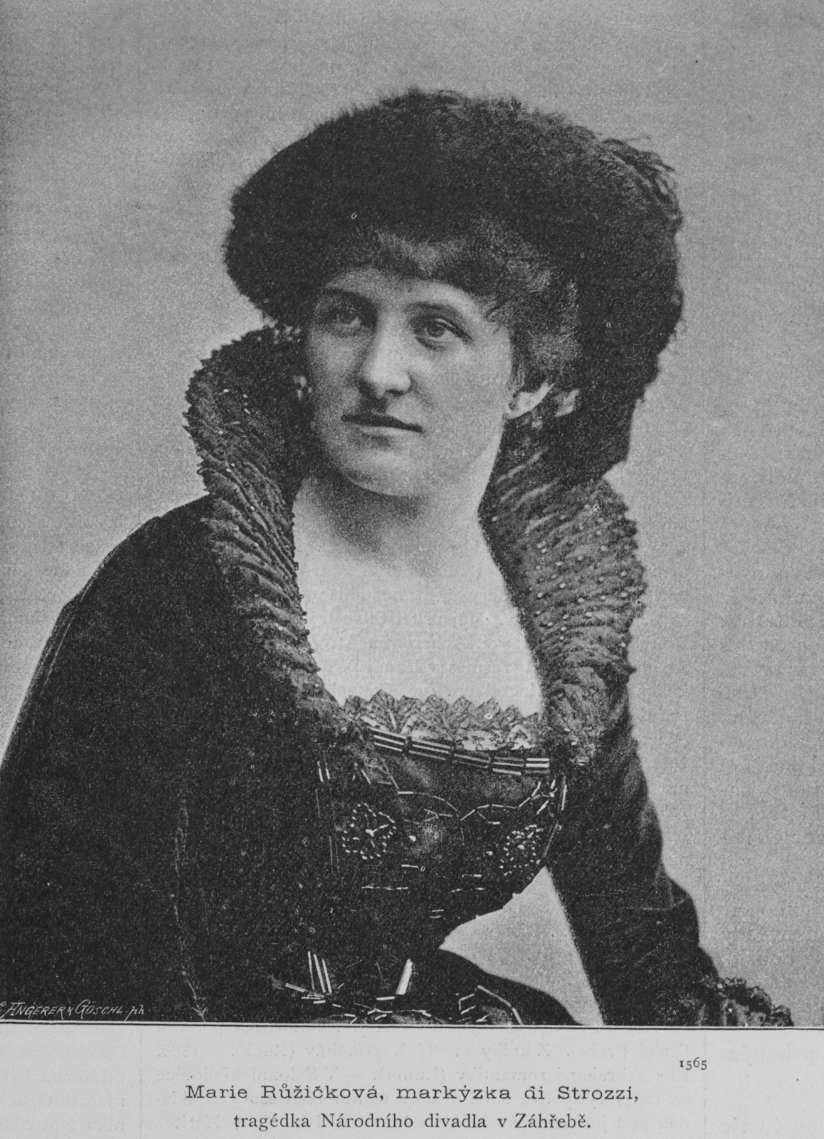
- Ružička Strozzi in 1886
- Born: Marija Terezija Ružička; 3 August 1850; Litovel, Margraviate of Moravia, Austrian Empire
- Died: 27 September 1937 (aged 87); Zagreb, Sava Banovina, Kingdom of Yugoslavia
- Occupation: Actress
- Spouse: Ferdinand Strozzi
- Children: 8 (including Tito and Maja)
- Relatives: Boris Papandopulo (grandson)
- Awards: Order of the White Lion

Marija Ružička Strozzi (3 August 1850 – 28 September 1937) was a Croatian actress. French Le Journal illustré named her "the greatest tragedy performer in all of Slavic South".

== Early life and singing career ==
Marija Terezija Ružička was born on 3 August 1850 in a Moravian town of Litovel to Leopold Růžička and Terezija Mauler. When Strozzi was four months old, actor Josip Freudenreich recommended her father to Dimitrija Demeter who invited him to join the Croatian National Theatre's orchestra so the family moved to Zagreb. At first, she attended German monastery school and performed for the first time in the monastery festivities. At the age of 15, she enrolled at the singing course of the Croatian Music Institute where she was trained by Vatroslav Lichtenegger. In 1878, she was trained in Burgtheater. In 1864, Strozzi performed at the Zagreb premiere of Ivan Köck's operetta Šerežanin as Clementine. In 1866, at the concert in Croatian Music Institute, she sang the soprano aria from Giuseppe Verdi's opera Nabucco. In the same time, Strozzi was preparing for the study at the Vienesse University of Music and Performing Arts but damaged the vocals (alto) and had to give up singing. She was so devastated that she wanted to commit suicide.

== Acting career ==
After medical treatment, Strozzi started taking private acting lessons from Josip Freudenreich, as recommended by Dimitrija Demeter. On 2 January 1868, she debuted in the Croatian National Theatre (HNK) as Jeane d'Eyre in the Charlotte Birch-Pfeiffer's drama Orphan of Lowood. On 17 February, she got permanent employment at HNK, at first playing sentimental naive girls and women, and girls and women in conversational cheerful games, occasionally performing in operas and operettas. Gradually, she played more complex characters from classical comedies, tragedies, civil dramas and conversational pieces. Her inseparable partner was Andrija Fijan with whom she performed in thirty-three seasons and performed in some of her major roles between 1880 and 1910. She performed in theaters in Dubrovnik, Pazin, Pula, Rijeka, Split, Zadar, Trieste, Brno, Sofia and Prague. Before the performance in Zadar, members of the Autonomist Party threatened her with a murder if she spoke Croatian on the stage which she ignored. She was also translating plays from Italian, Czech, and French into Croatian.

== Private life ==
Marija Ružička Strozzi married marquess Ferdinand de Strozzi on 20 February 1871. Her husband was a member of the old Florentine noble family. Strozzi's were the largest Croatian art dynasty. The couple had 8 children, 5 of which died of diphtheria and tuberculosis shortly after they were born so only three survived into adulthood, one of which died in the First World War. When her son Tito wanted to leave Zagreb and start building a career in Vienna, just before the First World War, she wrote to him: "Tito, you, as a Croat, intend to leave your homeland so relentlessly?"

She was an honorary member of the Brethren of the Croatian Dragon, National Theater in Prague and Yugoslav-Czechoslovak League. In 1928, President Tomáš Garrigue Masaryk awarded her the Order of the White Lion.

== Legacy ==
- In 1935, a memorial plaque was erected in her honor in Litovel but it was removed during the German occupation of Czechoslovakia, and returned in 2013.
- In the HNK's foyer, there are two of her bronze busts that were erected during her life.
- She is pictured on one of the solemn curtains of the Croatian National Theater in Zagreb, authored by Vlaho Bukovac.
- In 2000, Croatian Post issued a stamp with her portrait.
- Park in Varaždinske Toplice is named after her.

== Links ==
- List of performances (in Croatian)
