= Nikola Krestić =

Croatian Serb politician (1824–1887)

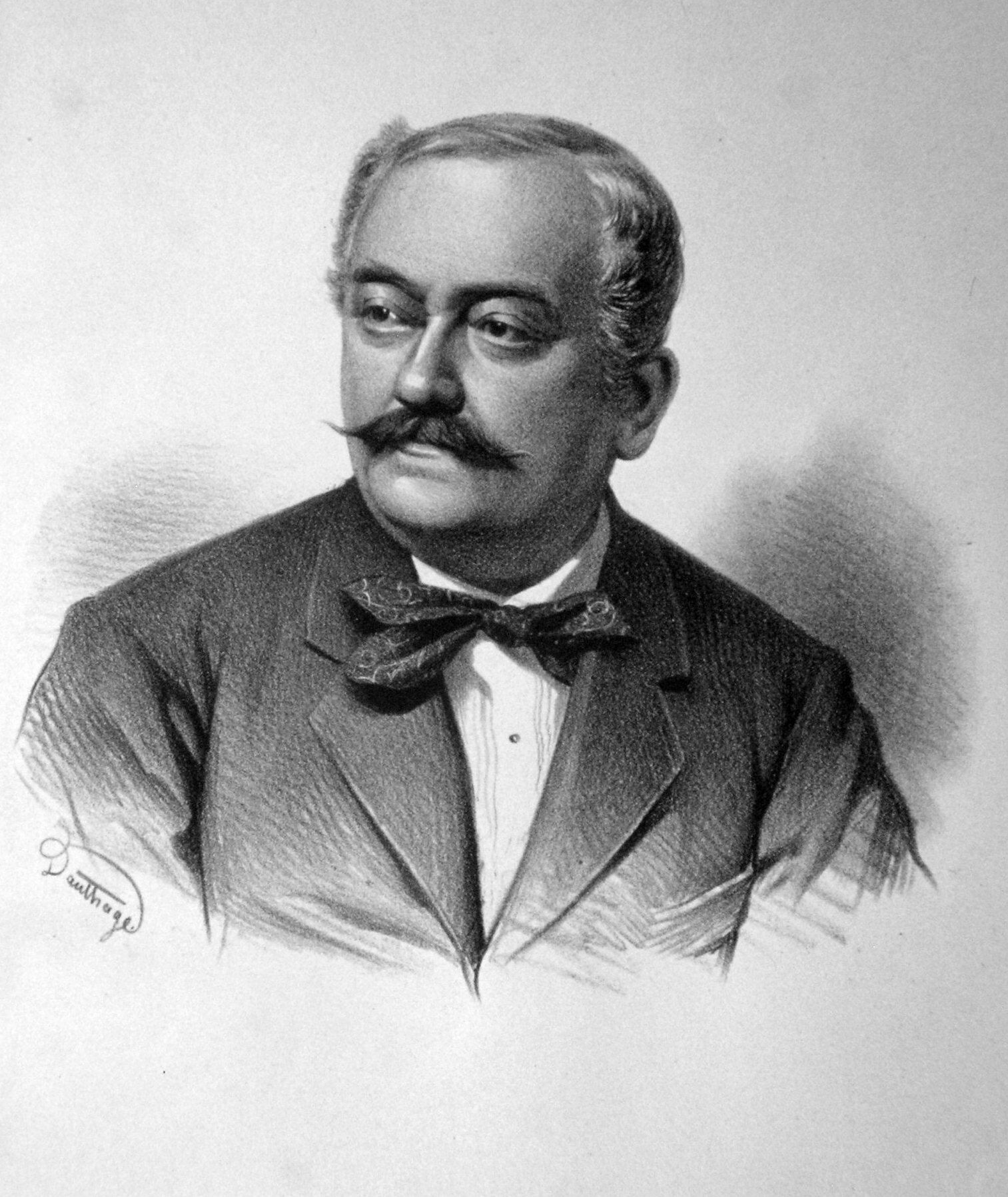

President of the Croatian Sabor
- In office 1873–1884
- Monarch: Franz Joseph I

Personal details
- Born: 22 December 1824 Zagreb, Austrian Empire
- Died: 1 December 1887 Zagreb, Austria-Hungary
- Party: People's Party
- Education: University of Zagreb; University of Budapest
- Occupation: Lawyer, politician
- Known for: First ethnic Serb president of Croatian Sabor

Nikola Krestić (Serbian Cyrillic: Никола Крестић; 1824–1887) was a Croatian Serb nobleman, politician and lawyer. In 1873 Ban of Croatia Ivan Mažuranić named him as the president of the Croatian Sabor. He served as president for 11 years. He was also a recipient of the Austrian Imperial Order of Leopold. Krestić studied Philosophy in Budapest and Law in Zagreb. He worked as a secretary for the Ban of Croatia Josip Jelačić for two years. He edited parliamentary Saborske novine and participated in foundation and worked as an edited of the Slavenski jug. Krestić never married and his home in Opatička Street 16 in Zagreb was a popular spot in the social and political life of Zagreb at the time. His personal library counted 4620 titles.
