= Milan Šenoa =

Croatian writer and geographer (1869–1961)

Milan Šenoa (July 2, 1869 – November 16, 1961) was a Croatian writer and geographer.

He was a son of the prominent writer August Šenoa. After graduating at the Faculty of Philosophy, Zagreb. He started working as a professor of geography in 1892, and received tenure in 1892.

He was the head of the Geographic Institute between 1922 and 1940. He authored more than 50 works in physics, social geography, and travelogues as well as numerous popular science articles and several novels.

In the book Liebesgeschichten der slawischen Völker, Gerhard Stalling Verlag 1959, it is mentioned that the author died in 1940 (see above "He was the head of the Geographic Institute in the period 1922-1940.")

== Works ==
- Rijeka Kupa i njezino porječje, 1895
- Pontsko-jadranska razvodnica, 1900
- Razvedenost istarskih i dalmatinskih otoka
- Tipovi naših gradova, 1930
- Kvarnerske pripovijesti
- Exodus (novel)
- Iz kobnih dana (novel)
