= List of people from Zagreb =

This list contains notable people both born in Zagreb and notable people who lived in or had noteworthy connections to the city. The list is ordered chronologically by year of birth.

== Born in Zagreb ==
=== 18th century and earlier ===
- Paul Skalich (1534–1575), humanist, polymath, and encyclopedist
- Josip Franjo Domin (1754–1819), pioneer of electrotherapy
- Johann Wilhelm Burich von Pournay (1792–1858), Austrian lieutenant field marshal
- János Erdődy (1794–1879), Hungarian politician and governor of Fiume
- Antun Mihanović (1796–1861), poet and diplomat

=== 19th century ===
- Franz von Kulmer (1806–1853), nobleman
- Dimitrija Demeter (1811–1872), poet and writer
- Ljudevit Vukotinović (1813–1893), politician, writer and naturalist
- Vatroslav Lisinski (1819–1854), composer
- Eugen Kvaternik (1825–1871), politician
- Mathilde von Marlow (1828–1888), opera singer
- Alois Czedik von Bründlsberg und Eysenberg (1830–1924), military officer and politician
- Mária Lebstück (1830–1892), military officer and freedom fighter
- Julius Epstein (1832–1926), pianist
- Alexander Petter (1832–1905), pharmacist and museum director
- Lavoslav Schwarz (1837–1906), merchant
- August Šenoa (1838–1881), writer and critic
- Mathilde Mallinger (1847–1920), opera singer and vocal pedagogue
- Milovan Zoričić (1850–1912), jurist and statistician
- Dragutin Gorjanović-Kramberger (1856–1936), geologist, paleontologist, and archeologist
- Maximilian Njegovan (1858–1930), admiral and fleet commander
- Ludwig Schiviz von Schivizhoffen (1859–1939), Austrian administrative official
- Leo Hönigsberg (1861–1911), architect
- Nikola Tomašić (1864–1918), politician, ban of the Kingdom of Croatia-Slavonia
- Viktor Alexander (1865–1934), lawyer and public prosecutor
- Pavao Rauch (1865–1933), politician, ban of the Kingdom of Croatia-Slavonia
- Franz von Bayros (1866–1924), graphic artist, illustrator, and painter
- Franjo Bučar (1866–1946), writer and sports official
- Albert Sever (1867–1942), politician
- Milan Šenoa (1869–1961), writer and geographer
- Ignjat Fischer (1870–1948), architect
- Ferdo Kovačević (1870–1927), painter and art professor
- Ferdinand Budicki (1871–1951), automobile and cycling advocate
- Robert Auer (1873–1952), painter
- Rudolf Lubinski (1873–1935), architect
- Viktor Kovačić (1874–1924), architect
- Ivo Pilar (1874–1933), jurist and historian
- Stjepan Podhorsky (1875–1945), architect
- Oskar Alexander (1876–1953), painter and professor
- Ivan Lorković (1876–1926), politician
- Edo Šen (1877–1949), architect
- Juro Tkalčić (1877–1957), cellist and composer
- Slavko Kvaternik (1878–1947), politician and military officer
- Hugo Ehrlich (1879–1936), architect
- Mirko Roš (1879–1962), civil engineer
- Vladimir Sachs-Petrović (1879 – unknown date in 1941–1945), politician and lawyer
- Paula Wolf-Kalmar (1880–1931), Austrian chess player
- Leo Delitz (1882–1966), Austrian painter
- Đuro Basariček (1884–1928), politician, lawyer and social activist
- Milovan Zoričić (1884–1971), jurist and football official
- Josip Račić (1885–1908), painter
- Ljubo Wiesner (1885–1951), poet and translator
- Egon Caesar Conte Corti (1886–1953), historian and writer
- Oskar Herman (1886–1974), painter
- Vera Nikolić Podrinska (1886–1972), painter and baroness
- Rudolf Zistler (1886–1960), Austro-Hungarian lawyer and socialist
- Zvonimir Rogoz (1887–1988), actor
- Marijan Trepše (1887–1964), painter, graphic artist and set designer
- Mira Klobučar (1888–1956), painter
- Vera Schwarz (1888–1964), opera singer
- Ivo Stern (1889–1961), lawyer, writer, journalist, and director
- Maksimilijan Vanka (1889–1963), artist
- Ivo Krbek (1890–1966), politician, lawyer, lecturer, and academic
- Ante Pandaković (1890–1968), footballer coach
- Vladimir Šterk (1891–1941), architect
- Dragutin Novak (1892–1978), airplane constructor
- Ivan Tomašević (1892–1945), military commander
- August Cesarec (1893–1941), writer and communist activist
- Miroslav Krleža (1893–1981), writer
- Lav Mirski (1893–1968), conductor
- Ivan Zemljak (1893–1963), architect
- Nikola Fink (1894–1968), zoologist
- Drago Ibler (1894–1964), architect
- Marino Tartaglia (1894–1984), painter and art teacher
- Zlatko Baloković (1895–1965), violinist
- Ivan Granec (1895–1923), footballer
- Archduke Rainer of Austria (1895–1930), the House of Habsburg-Lorraine, a member of the Tuscan branch of the Imperial House of Habsburg
- Svetislav Stančić (1895–1970), pianist and music pedagogue
- Jaroslav Šifer (1895–1982), footballer
- Vladimir Varlaj (1895–1962), artist
- Dragutin Vrđuka (1895–1948), footballer
- Alfred Albini (1896–1978), architect
- Juraj Andrassy (1896–1977), jurist
- Emil Perška (1896–1945), footballer
- Vladimir Vinek (1897–1945), footballer
- Archduke Leopold of Austria, Prince of Tuscany (1897–1958), the second son of Archduke Leopold Salvator, Prince of Tuscany and Infanta Blanca of Spain
- Dragutin Vragović (1897–1973), footballer
- Stjepan Betlheim (1898–1970), psychiatrist and psychoanalyst
- Josip Scholz (1898–1945), footballer
- Vladimir Vuković (1898–1975), chess writer, theoretician, player, arbiter, and journalist

=== 20th century ===
==== 1901–1910 ====
- Rudolf Matz (1901–1988), cellist and composer
- Fran Bošnjaković (1902–1993), physicist
- Jovan Karamata (1902–1967), mathematician
- Božidar Kunc (1903–1964), composer and pianist
- Milan Truban (1904–1929), cyclist
- William Feller (1906–1970), mathematician
- Zinka Milanov (1906–1989), opera singer
- Ivana Tomljenović-Meller (1906–1988), photographer
- Draga Matković (1907–2013), concert pianist
- Nenad Petrović (1907–1989), chess composer
- István Arató (1910–1980), composer
- Ernest Bauer (1910–1995), political scientist
- Eugen Dido Kvaternik (1910–1962), Ustaše General-Lieutenant

==== 1911–1920 ====
- Herbert Alois Kraus (1911–2008), journalist and politician
- Otto Seitz (1911–1974), general
- Ivo Lhotka-Kalinski (1913–1987), composer
- Rudi Supek (1913–1993), sociologist
- Branko Špoljar (1914–1985), actor
- Stjepan Šulek (1914–1986), composer and conductor
- Eugen Pusić (1916–2010), legal scholar
- Tvrtko Švob (1917–2008), biologist
- Mladen Bašić (1917–2012), pianist and conductor
- Miljeva Ypsilanti (1917–2013), physician
- Vladimir Milojčić (1918–1978), archaeologist
- Branimir Sakač (1918–1979), composer

==== 1921–1930 ====
- Thomas Fodi (1922–1980), German politician
- Stjepan Bobek (1923–2010), football player and manager
- Zlatko Čajkovski (1923–1998), football player and manager
- Milan Kangrga (1923–2008), professor
- Vlado Kristl (1923–2004), filmmaker
- Vladimir Medar (1923–1978), actor
- Ivan Snoj (1923–1994), handball official
- Thea Altaras (1924–2004), architect
- Juraj Amšel (1924–1988), water polo player
- Berislav Klobučar (1924–2014), conductor
- Jean Lindenmann (1924–2015), Swiss virologist
- Zvonimir Bajsić (1925–1987), dramatist
- Željko Čajkovski (1925–2016), football player and manager
- Branimir Karabajić (1925–2003), comics artist
- Mara Kraus (1925–2024), Holocaust survivor
- Ivo Malec (1925–2019), French composer
- Miljenko Prohaska (1925–2014), bassist and composer
- Branka Stilinović (1926–2016), opera singer
- Lea Deutsch (1927–1943), child actress
- Bernard Vukas (1927–1983), football player
- Zdenko Uzorinac (1929–2005), table tennis player
- Branco Weiss (1929–2010), entrepreneur
- Branko Zebec (1929–1988), football player and manager
- Relja Bašić (1930–2017), actor and politician
- Radoslav Katičić (1930–2019), linguist

==== 1931–1940 ====
- Melita Švob (born 1931), biologist
- Elma Karlowa (1932–1994), film actress
- Hrvoje Bartolović (1932–2005), chess composer
- Zvonimir Janko (1932–2022), mathematician
- Bora Ćosić (born 1932), writer
- Tugomir Franc (1932–1983), opera singer
- Sylva Koscina (1933–1994), actress
- Davor Kajfeš (1934–2024), pianist and composer
- Vlado Stenzel (born 1934), handball coach
- Alfi Kabiljo (1935–2025), composer and conductor
- Ivica Šerfezi (1935–2004), pop singer
- Vladimir Kranjčević (1936–2020), conductor
- Ljerka Njerš (born 1937), ceramic artist
- Eva Zora (born 1937), film editor
- Ante Kostelić (born 1938), sports coach
- Zlatko Šimenc (born 1938), water polo player
- Branko Bošnjaković (born 1939), physicist
- Mirjana Irosch (1939–2024), opera singer
- Boro Jovanović (1939–2023), tennis player
- Milivoje Marković (1939–2017), jazz musician
- Milan Turković (born 1939), bassoonist
- Ingrid Fickler (born 1940), jurist and politician

==== 1941–1950 ====
- Vlado Milunić (1941–2022), architect
- Tomaž Šalamun (1941–2014), poet
- Zlatko Škorić (1941–2019), football player
- Ozren Bonačić (born 1942), water polo player
- Srećko Lipovčan (1942–2009), journalist
- Josip Milković (born 1942), handball player
- Wendelin Schmidt-Dengler (1942–2008), literary scholar
- Zdravko Hebel (1943–2017), water polo player
- Zdenko Kobeščak (born 1943), football player
- Dunja Vejzović (born 1943), opera singer
- Albin Vidović (1943–2018), handball player
- Zlatko Žagmešter (born 1943), handball coach
- Ronald Lopatny (1944–2022), water polo player
- Miroslav Poljak (1944–2015), water polo player
- Nenad Bićanić (1945–2016), civil engineer
- Mišo Cebalo (1945–2022), chess grandmaster
- Sasha D'Arc (born 1945), actor
- Rada Iveković (born 1945), philosopher
- Ognjen Kraus (born 1945), physician
- Predrag Cvitanović (born 1946), physicist
- Daša Drndić (1946–2018), writer
- Gvozden Flego (born 1946), philosopher
- Goran Milić (born 1946), journalist
- Žarko Puhovski (born 1946), professor
- Dragutin Šurbek (1946–2018), table tennis player
- Krešimir Ćosić (1948–1995), basketball player
- Eugen Pleško (1948–2020), cyclist
- Krunoslav Cigoj (1949–2015), opera singer
- Radimir Čačić (born 1949), entrepreneur
- Zlatko Mateša (born 1949), politician
- Božo Bakota (1950–2015), football player
- Mladen Baraković (1950–2021), jazz musician
- Sonja Lahnstein-Kandel (born 1950), philanthropist
- Josipa Lisac (born 1950), rock singer
- Sandy Marton (born 1950), musician
- Zdenko Zorko (born 1950), handball coach

==== 1951–1960 ====
- Ivica Todorić (born 1951), businessman
- Jasenka Villbrandt (born 1951), politician
- Ingeborg Fülepp (born 1952), media artist
- Srećko Puntarić (born 1952), cartoonist
- Luciano Moše Prelević (born 1953), rabbi
- Mirjana Ognjenović (born 1953), handball player
- Miroslav Nemec (born 1954), actor
- Damir Andrei (born 1955), actor
- Snješko Cerin (born 1955), football player
- Mira Furlan (1955–2021), actress
- Mladen Kunstic (born 1955), visual artist
- Elvira Plenar (born 1955), pianist
- Vlado Fumić (born 1956), cyclist
- Zlatko Kranjčar (1956–2021), football manager
- Velimir Zajec (born 1956), football manager
- Ratko Cvetnić (born 1957), author
- Ivo Josipović (born 1957), politician and composer
- Krunoslav Levačić (born 1957), jazz musician
- Ranko Vilović (born 1957), diplomat
- Zlatko Pleše (born 1958), religious scholar
- Smail Rapic (born 1958), philosopher
- Dubravka Šimonović (born 1958), human rights expert
- Vedran Mornar (born 1959), politician
- Ivan Šimonović (born 1959), diplomat
- Adriana Altaras (born 1960), actress
- Damir Keretić (born 1960), tennis player
- Tomislav Ivković (born 1960), football goalkeeper
- Marko Mlinarić (born 1960), football player
- Dobroslav Paraga (born 1960), politician
- Adnan Terzić (born 1960), politician

==== 1961–1970 ====
- Tomislav Paškvalin (born 1961), water polo player
- Sanja Vejnović (born 1961), actress
- Radovan Vlatković (born 1962), horn player
- Peter Davor (born 1963), actor
- Nebojša Koharović (born 1963), diplomat
- Tatjana Šimić (born 1963), actress
- Jan von Klewitz (born 1964), jazz musician
- Miljenko Matijevic (born 1964), rock singer
- Saša Nestorović (born 1964), jazz musician
- Goran Prpić (born 1964), tennis player
- Andreja Schneider (born 1964), singer
- Dubravka Vukušić (born 1965), speed skater
- Robert Basic (1966–2018), blogger
- Ivan Đikić (born 1966), scientist
- Nikola Jurčević (born 1966), football manager
- Nenad Kljaić (born 1966), handball player
- Damir Lukačević (born 1966), film director
- Zoran Milanović (born 1966), politician
- Dubravko Šimenc (born 1966), water polo player
- Gordan Bakota (born 1967), diplomat
- Bruno Orešar (born 1967), tennis player
- Dubravko Pavličić (1967–2012), football player
- Zvonimir Soldo (born 1967), football manager
- Asja Valčić (born 1967), cellist
- Vlado Papić (born 1968), football player
- Željko Mavrović (born 1969), boxer
- Andrej Panadić (born 1969), football manager
- Barbara Rocco (born 1969), actress
- Zoran Dukić (born 1969), classical guitarist
- Tajči (born 1970), singer
- Krešimir Čuljak (born 1970), rower
- Davor Derenčinović (born 1970), jurist
- Danijel Drilo (born 1970), musician
- Nataša Ilić (born 1970), curator
- Andrej Plenković (born 1970), politician
- Richard Steiner (born 1970), entrepreneur
- Branko Strupar (born 1970), football player
- Hrvoje Verzi (born 1970), athlete
- Ratko Zjača (born c.1970), jazz musician

==== 1971–1980 ====
- Slađan Ašanin (born 1971), football player
- Tomislav Farkaš (born 1971), handball player
- Nicol Ljubić (born 1971), journalist
- Nina Badrić (born 1972), singer
- Anna Baar (born 1973), writer
- Matija Dedić (1973–2025), jazz musician
- Zlatko Hasanbegović (born 1973), historian
- Igor Jovićević (born 1973), football manager
- Vedran Pavlek (born 1973), alpine skier
- Nebojša Slijepčević (born 1973), film director
- Željko Vlahović (born 1973), pianist
- Tomislav Butina (born 1974), football goalkeeper
- Vjekoslav Kobešćak (born 1974), water polo player
- Vladimir Miholjević (born 1974), cyclist
- Domagoj Špoljar (born 1974), squash player
- Mario Cvitanović (born 1975), football player
- Silvio Marić (born 1975), football player
- Sabina Sabolović (born 1975), curator
- Dario Šimić (born 1975), football player
- Marijo Strahonja (born 1975), football referee
- Nenad Čanak (born 1976), basketball player
- Max Emanuel Cenčić (born 1976), countertenor
- Mario Galinović (born 1976), football goalkeeper
- Hana Hegedušić (born 1976), actress
- Gordan Kožulj (born 1976), swimmer
- Luka Peroš (born 1976), actor
- Sreto Ristić (born 1976), football player
- Silvije Čavlina (born 1977), football goalkeeper
- Jurica Golemac (born 1977), basketball player
- Danijel Grgić (born 1977), handball player
- Branko Hucika (born 1977), football player
- Iva Majoli (born 1977), tennis player
- Josip Šimić (born 1977), football player
- Igor Bišćan (born 1978), football manager
- Petar Ćiritović (born 1978), actor
- Igor Kos (born 1978), handball player
- Veljko Žibret (born 1978), ice hockey player
- Igor Jačmenjak (born 1979), ice hockey player
- Ivo Karlović (born 1979), tennis player
- Boris Krčmar (born 1979), darts player
- Kristina Krepela (born 1979), actress
- Ivica Kostelić (born 1979), alpine skier
- Tamara Perišin (born 1979), judge
- Dominik Sedlar (born 1979), film director
- Antonija Šola (born 1979), singer
- Denis Špoljarić (born 1979), handball player
- Krešimir Švigir (born 1979), ice hockey player
- Vedran Zrnić (born 1979), handball player
- Hrvoje Miholjević (born 1979), cyclist
- Leona Paraminski (born 1979), actress
- Hrvoje Banaj (born 1980), singer
- Ivica Banović (born 1980), football player
- Frane Čačić (born 1980), football player
- Jerko Leko (born 1980), football player
- Mihael Mikić (born 1980), football player
- Ivan Turina (1980–2013), football goalkeeper
- Igor Vori (born 1980), handball coach

==== 1981–1990 ====
- Andrea Bakula (born 1981), table tennis player
- Saša Belić (born 1981), football player
- Dino Drpić (born 1981), football player
- Tomislav Dujmović (born 1981), football player
- Ivan Herceg (born 1981), actor
- Matija Kopajtić (born 1981), ice hockey player
- Igor Barukčić (born 1982), football player
- Roko Karanušić (born 1982), tennis player
- Janica Kostelić (born 1982), alpine skier
- Marko Lovrenčić (born 1982), ice hockey player
- Nenad Škrapec (born 1982), ice hockey goaltender
- Vanja Belić (born 1983), ice hockey player
- Josip Čale (born 1983), handball player
- Alojzije Janković (born 1983), chess player
- Zoran Pribičević (born 1983), actor
- Ante Tomić (born 1983), football player
- Nenad Žugaj (born 1983), wrestler
- Zlatko Horvat (born 1984), handball player
- Andrea Ivančević (born 1984), hurdler
- Niko Kranjčar (born 1984), football player
- Mensur Mujdža (born 1984), football player
- Fran Paškvalin (born 1984), water polo player
- Tomislav Zanoški (born 1984), ice hockey player
- Mario Brkljača (born 1985), football player
- Hrvoje Čale (born 1985), football player
- Andrea Kobetić (born 1985), handball player
- Branimir Koloper (born 1985), handball coach
- Morena Makar (born 1985), snowboarder
- Sanda Mamić (born 1985), tennis player
- Ivana Brkić (born 1986), singer
- Nikolina Horvat (born 1986), hurdler
- Janko Kević (born 1986), handball player
- Filip Lončarić (born 1986), football goalkeeper
- Ivan Ratkić (born 1986), alpine skier
- Tomislav Sulevski (born 1986), ice hockey player
- Natko Zrnčić-Dim (born 1986), alpine skier
- Jelena Grubišić (born 1987), handball player
- Marina Kovačec (born 1987), biathlete
- Luka Lončar (born 1987), water polo player
- Marko Petrić (born 1987), actor
- Tin Široki (born 1987), alpine skier
- Nikki Bohm (born 1988), actress
- Ivan Kelava (born 1988), football goalkeeper
- Nikola Mektić (born 1988), tennis player
- Michael Novak (born 1988), ice hockey player
- Luka Raković (born 1988), handball player
- Manuel Štrlek (born 1988), handball player
- Milan Badelj (born 1989), football player
- Ivan Tomečak (born 1989), football player
- Miro Varvodić (born 1989), football player
- Martina Zubčić (born 1989), taekwondo practitioner
- Sandra Elkasević (born 1990), discus thrower
- Ivan Šijan (born 1990), ice hockey player
- Nikša Trstenjak (born 1990), ice hockey player

==== 1991–2000 ====
- Karlo Belak (born 1991), football player
- Mislav Blagus (born 1991), ice hockey player
- Josip Ivančić (born 1991), football player
- Dominik Kanaet (born 1991), ice hockey player
- Andrej Kramarić (born 1991), football player
- Marcelo Brozović (born 1992), football player
- Ante Gadža (born 1992), handball player
- Nikola Gatarić (born 1992), football player
- Igor Lazić (born 1992), ice hockey player
- Filip Mihaljević (born 1992), football player
- Matea Parlov Koštro (born 1992), athlete
- Luka Mikulić (born 1993), ice hockey player
- Filip Mrzljak (born 1993), football player
- Ante Tokić (born 1993), handball player
- Ante Vukičević (born 1993), water polo player
- Luka Bukić (born 1994), water polo player
- Robert Janjiš (born 1994), football player
- Lovro Jotić (born 1994), handball player
- Tomislav Kušan (born 1994), handball player
- Lovro Mihić (born 1994), handball player
- Zvonimir Babić (born 1995), tennis player
- Davor Ćavar (born 1995), handball player
- Tin Jedvaj (born 1995), football player
- Josip Juranović (born 1995), football player
- Marko Pjaca (born 1995), football player
- Ivan Vida (born 1995), handball player
- Luka Vukoja (born 1995), ice hockey player
- Toma Bašić (born 1996), football player
- Borna Ćorić (born 1996), tennis player
- Jana Fett (born 1996), tennis player
- Fran Karačić (born 1996), football player
- Bruno Kegalj (born 1996), ice hockey player
- Petar Mamić (born 1996), football player
- Martin Marković (born 1996), athlete
- Ivan Puzić (born 1996), ice hockey player
- Nino Serdarušić (born 1996), tennis player
- Tin Srbić (born 1996), gymnast
- Filip Benković (born 1997), football player
- Tomislav Severec (born 1997), handball player
- Jan Smolec (born 1997), ice hockey player
- Petar Turković (born 1997), football player
- Josip Brekalo (born 1998), football player
- Bruno Fičur (born 1998), ice hockey player
- Franko Knez (born 1998), football player
- Lovro Majer (born 1998), football player
- Petar Musa (born 1998), football player
- Borna Sosa (born 1998), football player
- Frane Ninčević (born 1999), tennis player
- Toni Ročak (born 1999), basketball player
- Dario Špikić (born 1999), football player
- David Čolina (born 2000), football player
- Bartol Franjić (born 2000), football player
- Ante Ivanković (born 2000), handball player
- Jan Jurčec (born 2000), football player
- Karpo Sirotić (born 2000), handball player

=== 21st century ===
- Patrik Dobrić (born 2001), ice hockey player
- Roko Jurišić (born 2001), football player
- Antonio Marin (born 2001), football player
- Jura Štimac (born 2001), football player
- Karla Antunović (born 2002), volleyball player
- Dion Drena Beljo (born 2002), football player
- Joško Gvardiol (born 2002), football player
- Jan Kovačec (born 2002), handball player
- Dominik Kuzmanović (born 2002), handball player
- Bartol Barišić (born 2003), football player
- Ante Bebek (born 2003), ice hockey player
- Mia Brkić (born 2003), handball player
- Lara Burić (born 2003), handball player
- Niko Cavlović (born 2003), ice hockey player
- Alex Dimitrijević (born 2003), ice hockey player
- Tomislav Duvnjak (born 2003), football player
- Vito Idžan (born 2003), ice hockey player
- Lorian Bezuk (born 2004), ice hockey player
- Zrinka Ljutić (born 2004), alpine skier
- Karlo Marinković (born 2004), ice hockey player
- Matea Marinković (born 2004), ice hockey player
- Dominik Prpić (born 2004), football player
- Petra Marčinko (born 2005), tennis player
- Bruno Idžan (born 2006), ice hockey player
- Vita Penezić (born 2006), sprinter
- Katja Vuković (born 2006), handball player

== Other people who lived in Zagreb or with connections to Zagreb ==
- Rudolf von Chavanne (1850–1936), Austro-Hungarian general
- Ivana Brlić-Mažuranić (1874–1938), children's author
- Stjepan Gomboš (1895–1975), architect
- Antun Branko Šimić (1898–1925), writer
- Antun Augustinčić (1900–1979), sculptor
- Siegfried Kasche (1903–1947), Ambassador of Nazi Germany to the Independent State of Croatia
- Iva Zabkar (b. 20th century), Austrian composer

== See also ==
- List of mayors of Zagreb
- List of GNK Dinamo Zagreb managers
- The dictionary definition of Zagrebian at Wiktionary
