= Bettelheim =

Bettelheim is a surname and Jewish family.

== History ==
The first bearer of the Bettelheim name is said to have lived toward the second half of the 18th century, in Pressburg (Pozsony, today Bratislava). To account for its origin, the following episode is related in the family records:

There was a Jewish merchant in Bratislava (now in Slovakia) (before Pozsony), whose modest demeanor gained for him the esteem of his fellow-townsmen. He was popularly called "Ein ehrlich Jud" (honest Jew). His wife was a woman of surpassing beauty, and many magnates of the country, hearing of her charms, traveled to Pozsony to see her. Count Bethlen was particularly persistent, and, failing to attract her attention, he decided to abduct her. Mounted on his charger, he appeared one day in the open market, where the virtuous woman was making purchases, and in the sight of hundreds of spectators, lifted her on his horse, and heedless of her cries of entreaty, was about to gallop off with her, when her husband appeared on the scene and, after a fierce personal combat, succeeded in rescuing her.

That a Jew should engage in a hand-to-hand encounter with a nobleman of the rank of Count Bethlen was so unprecedented, and the deed itself was so daring in view of the social status of the Jews of those times (which remained unchanged until the liberal laws of Emperor Joseph II were promulgated), that the populace thenceforth styled the hero of the story "Bethlen-Jude". This name clung to him until the royal edict, bidding Jews to assume family names, went into force, and then the name was changed to "Bettelheim". Among the family relics preserved by a scion of the house in Freystadtel, on the Waga (Hungarian: Galgóc(z)), is an oil painting that depicts the daring rescue of Bethlen-Jude's wife from the hands of her abductor.

== People ==
- Anton Bettelheim (1851–1930), Austrian critic and journalist
- Bernard Jean Bettelheim (1811–1870), Hungarian born Christian missionary to Okinawa, the first Protestant missionary to be active there
- Bruno Bettelheim (1903–1990), Austrian-born self-professed psychologist, public intellectual and author
- Caroline von Gomperz-Bettelheim, Hungarian-Austrian singer
- Charles Bettelheim (1913–2006), French Marxian economist and historian
- Jakob Bettelheim (1841–1909), Austrian-German dramatist, writer and translator
- Leopold Bettelheim (1777–1838), Hungarian physician

== Variant surnames ==
- Stjepan Betlheim (1898–1970), prominent Croatian psychiatrist and psychoanalyst
