= Vladimir Varlaj =

Croatian artist (1895–1962)

- Born: 25 August 1895; Zagreb, Kingdom of Croatia-Slavonia, Austria-Hungary
- Died: 15 August 1962 (aged 66); Zagreb, PR Croatia, FPR Yugoslavia
- Education: Zagreb, Prague
- Known for: painting, graphics
- Movement: expressionist

Vladimir Varlaj (25 August 1895 – 15 August 1962) was a Croatian artist, a member of the Group of Four during the Zagreb Spring Salon of the 1920s, and a founder of the Independent Group of Artists. He was influential in the Zagreb modern art scene of the 1920s and 1930s, best known for his landscape paintings and his contribution in bringing wider European influences to Croatian art.

== Biography ==
Vladimir Varlaj was born 25 August 1895 in Zagreb. After he completed primary school in Zagreb, the family lived for a time in Karlovac, where Vladimir attended high school. In 1911 he continued his education in Zagreb, firstly at the private painting school of Tomislav Krizman, where he met fellow students Vilko Gecan and Milivoj Uzelac. During 1913–14, Varlaj went on to study at the College of Arts and Crafts, at the same time working in the photographic studio of Mikhail Mercep.

During the First World War, in 1915 Varlaj was mobilized and his unit sent to the Russian front. By 1917, he returned from the war as an invalid. One year later, he moved to Prague, joining his friends Milivoj Uzelac, Vilko Gecan and Marijan Trepše. He enrolled at the Academy there, but never completed his studies.

Returning to Zagreb at the end of the war, Varlaj, Uzelac, Gecan and Trepše became known as the Group of Four, or the Prague Four. They exhibited together at the Spring Salon in Zagreb from 1919, and were well received by audiences and critics. In 1920, Varlaj's work also appeared at an international exhibition in Geneva, and from 1921, he was a member of the Independent Group of Artists (Grupa nezavisnih umjetnika) whose other members were Ljubo Babić, Vladimir Becić, Jozo Kljaković, Frano Kršinić, Ivan Meštrović, Jerolim Miše, Marin Studin and Zlatko Šulentić.

In 1934, by then a well-known painter, Varlaj completed his official training by graduating from the Academy of Fine Arts in the class of Marino Tartaglia. In his later years he suffered from ill health, and for over 10 years used a wheelchair.

Vladimir Varlaj died on 15 August 1962 in Zagreb.

== Legacy ==
Varlaj was one of the founders of the Group of Independent Artists. From 1921 to 1925, the group organized numerous exhibitions at home and abroad, making a great contribution to the development of visual arts in Croatia. From 1920 to the early 1940s he produced numerous landscapes in watercolour and oils of Gorski Kotar, the Kvarner region, and Dalmatian scenes from Korčula, Dubrovnik, and Vis. Along with these marine landscapes were views of pastures and valleys from continental Croatia (Klek, Dobra, and around Zagreb).

The 1920s were the most intensely creative period of Varlaj's life. Although primarily a landscape artist, he also painted a few portraits and still lifes. His career ended around 1933 due to advanced disease, and from then on he painted very little. Over the last ten years of his life he was mostly a wheelchair user and died almost forgotten by the public in 1962. However, Varlaj was an extremely valuable, persistent and meticulous painter who was completely dedicated to his work. His paintings represent some of the most beautiful images that are now part of the history of Croatian landscape painting.

A retrospective of his work was held in 1992 at the Art Pavilion in Zagreb

In 2000, Croatian Postal Service issued a stamp with Varlaj's "Korčula", 1926, as part of their Croatian Visual Arts series.

== Exhibitions ==
During his lifetime, held many solo exhibitions as well as participating in the Zagreb Spring Salon with the Group of Four, and with the Group of Independent Artists.

=== Solo exhibitions ===
Recent exhibitions of his work include:

- 1992-3 Vladimir Varlaj retrospektiva, Art Pavilion Zagreb

=== Public collections ===
Vladimir Varlaj's work can be found in the following public collections

Croatia

- Museum of Contemporary Art, Zagreb
- Modern Gallery, Zagreb

== Bibliography ==
- Enciklopedija hrvatskih umjetnika (gl. ur. Žarko Domljan) Miroslav Krleža Lexicographical Institute, Zagreb 1996.
- Monograph: Slikarstvo Vladimira Varlaja (Paintings of Vladimir Varlaj), author: Frano Dulibić, Zagreb 2011. ISBN 978-953-6106-80-6
