= Milivoj Uzelac =

- Born: 23 July 1897; Mostar, Austria-Hungary (today's Bosnia Hercegovina)
- Died: 6 June 1977 (aged 79); Cotignac, France
- Education: Zagreb, Prague
- Known for: painting, graphics, illustrator
- Movement: expressionist, post-cubist

Milivoj Uzelac (1897–1977) was a painter influential in the Zagreb modern art scene of the 1920s and 30s. During the Zagreb Spring Salon of the 1920s, he participated with Vilko Gecan, Marijan Trepše and Vladimir Varlaj as the Group of Four. Uzelac spent much of his professional life in France, and is best known for his portraits and interior scenes with bohemian characters.

== Biography ==
Milivoj Uzelac was born 23 July 1897 in Mostar to a Serbian family, which was then part of Austria-Hungary. In 1903, the family moved to Banja Luka. At the gymnasium there, he started drawing and painting under Pero Popović, a former student of Vlaho Bukovac. There he met fellow artist Vilko Gecan, with whom he developed a lasting friendship. Uzelac's father died in the autumn of 1911, and the following year his mother took Milivoj and his two sisters to Zagreb. In 1912-13, Uzelac, together with Vilko Gecan, attended the private art school of Tomislav Krizman. In November that year, they first encountered the work of Miroslav Kraljević, who was to become a significant influence on the art of their generation. At the age of 16, Uzelac passed the entrance exam for the College for Arts and Crafts, and spent two years studying under Oton Iveković

In 1915, during the First World War, Uzelac moved to Prague where he worked in the studio of the painter Jan Preisler, while attending classes at the Academy. He was later joined by Vilko Gecan, Marijan Trepše and Vladimir Varlaj. Following the end of the war, in 1919 the four returned to Zagreb, where they exhibited their work at the Spring Salon.

In the autumn of 1920, the Artists’ Association allotted Uzelac a studio in Zagreb, where he produced some of his strongest work. In 1921, he spent the early part of the year in Paris, in the Montparnasse area.

In 1923, Uzelac moved to Paris, taking up his residence in the suburb of Malakoff. He painted extensively, and absorbed the current ideas of classicism and cubism. He fitted well into his new surroundings, receiving commissions and successfully selling his work. Only one year after his arrival, he entered four paintings into the autumn salon.

By 1925, Uzelac's success led to his first solo exhibition in Paris at the Marguerite library. He was working hard during the day and living a full social life at night. Success brought prosperity, and he socialized with many influential people and collectors, as well as with beautiful women. In 1928, he moved from the suburbs into a studio in town, where Vilko Gecan visited him that summer.

In 1930, Uzelac met Rosemarie da la Rayere, who was to become his permanent model and partner in life.

From 1935 Uzelac increasingly spent time in the south of France, and in 1963, the family moved to Cotignac.

In 1971, the Modern Gallery in Zagreb held a retrospective exhibition of his work. In 2008-9, the Art Pavilion held a posthumous retrospective.

Milivoj Uzelac died on 6 June 1977 in Cotignac, France.

== Legacy ==
Uzelac and his fellow painters made Prague an important reference for Croatian modern art. There they picked up new ideas of jugendstil (art nouveau), symbolism, secessionism and expressionism from Germany, as well as Manet and Cézanne, along with cubist ideas from Paris, Miroslav Kraljevic from Zagreb, old masters such as Velázquez, Van Dyck, Goya.

During the Prague-Zagreb years (up to 1923), Uzelac's work reflected the spirit of war-torn Austro-Hungary, with a strong social content and move to return to nature. Between 1918 and 1923, his work includes narrative, expressive scenes with a nightmarish and sometimes erotic quality. Images depict a bohemian revelry with a cast of interesting characters - artists, writers, singers, actors, dancers, circus performers - especially girls and young women.

Some of Uzelac's best work of the time was produced at his studio in Zagreb, including "In the Studio of the Bohemian" (1920). This painting shows strong influences of Miroslav Kraljević and Édouard Manet, and demonstrates a new maturity in Uzelac's work. His brief stay in Paris in early 1921 added Neo-Cubism ideas from the school of André Lhote. In the paintings following his return to Zagreb, a new spatial organization appeared, and active reduction in the forms. In 1923, Uzelac produced the painting that is now considered to be his key work: "Self-Portrait in front of a Bar".

After his permanent move to France (1923–1977), Uzelac produced an extensive number of works in a wide range of techniques: oil, tempera, lacquer, gouache, chalk, ink, and graphics. He created many decorative panels for private homes and public spaces, stage sets, posters, illustrations and ceramics. Uzelac's work can be considered more eclectic than avantgarde. He painted portraits, views, street scenes, cafés and scenes from private life, with an ease that could appear superficial. Uzelac was a master at shaping the body, particularly of female subjects. His portraits create a feeling of intimacy, a strong feature of his painting style. Travels to the south of France produced a series of lighter paintings in a brighter colour palette. Amongst his vast output were a string of great works in which references to Matisse and Derain were executed in Uzelac's own personal style. These include Portrait of a Woman with a Model Sailing Ship (1931), Area from the Window (1932), Plane Trees (1933), Black Skin (1934), Odalisque on Cushions (1934), and Painter and Model (1934).

Though much of his life was spent in France, Uzelac continued to maintain links with the Croatian art scene, exhibiting in Zagreb and other places within the former Yugoslavia right up to the end of his life.

In 2002, the Croatian Post issued a stamp with Uzelac's "Girl in a Boat", as part of their Croatian Modern Arts series.

== Works ==
=== Paintings ===
- Zeleni akt (Female nude), 1918
- Tri portreta (Three portraits), 1919
- Ljubavni par (Loving Couple), 1919
- Žena sa šeširom (Woman with a hat), 1919
- In Nature, 1920–23
- U atelijeru boema (In the studio of a Bohemian), 1920
- Magdalene, 1921
- Sfinga velegrada (Sphinx of a Metropolis), 1921
- Red Nude, 1922
- Allegory of the Echo, 1922
- Allegory of Music, 1922
- Three Female Nudes, 1923
- Autoportret pred barom (Self-portrait in front of a bar), 1922
- Auto-portret (Self-portrait), 1922
- Three Graces, 1925
- Portrait of a Woman with a Model Sailing Ship, 1931
- Predeo s prozora (View from the Window), 1932
- Plane Trees, 1933
- Black Skin, 1934
- Odalisque on Cushions, 1934
- Painter and Model, 1934
- U vrtu (In the Garden), 1939

== Exhibitions ==
During his lifetime, held many solo exhibitions as well as participating in the Zagreb Spring Salon, and with the Group of Four.

=== Solo exhibitions ===
Recent exhibitions of his work include:

- 2008-9 Milivoj Uzelac retrospektiva, Art Pavilion Zagreb
- 1971 Milivoj Uzelac retrospektiva, Modern Gallery, Zagreb

=== Group exhibitions ===
- 2011 Passion and rebellion: Expressionism in Croatia, Klovićevi dvori, Zagreb
- 2007–2008 100 Prime Works Of Croatian Artists From The Collections Of The National Museum In Belgrade, Art Pavilion, Zagreb
- 2008 Iz fundusa galerije - Museum of Modern Art, Dubrovnik
- 2007 Iz fundusa galerije - Museum of Modern Art, Dubrovnik

=== Public collections ===
Milivoj Uzelac's work can be found in the following public collections

Croatia

- Museum of Contemporary Art, Zagreb
- Modern Gallery, Zagreb
- Gallery of Fine Arts, Split
- Museum of Modern Art, Dubrovnik
- Museum of Modern and Contemporary Art, Rijeka

Serbia

- National Museum, Belgrade

== Bibliography ==
- Enciklopedija hrvatskih umjetnika (gl. ur. Žarko Domljan) Leksikografski zavod Miroslav Krleža, Zagreb 1996.
- O retrospektivi u Umjetničkom paviljonu 2008.
