= Vilko Gecan =

Croatian painter (1894–1973)

- Born: 16 June 1894; Kuželj, Austria-Hungary (today's Croatia)
- Died: 25 June 1973 (aged 79); Zagreb, SFR Yugoslavia (today's Croatia)
- Education: Zagreb, Munich
- Known for: painting, graphics, illustrator, caricaturist
- Movement: expressionist

Vilko Gecan (16 June 1894 – 25 June 1973) was a Croatian painter, influential in the Zagreb modern art scene of the 1920s and 1930s. He is best known for his expressionist paintings and drawings, and for his contributions to the local avantgarde magazine Zenit. He showed his work in many solo and group exhibitions in Croatia and abroad. In the Zagreb Spring Salon of the 1920s, he participated with Milivoj Uzelac, Marijan Trepše and Vladimir Varlaj, who together were known as the "Group of Four" or "The Prague Four". Trained in Prague, works of these young painters brought new expressionist ideas that went on to dominate the 1920s Croatian art scene.

Vilko Gecan is considered one of the masters of early Croatian expressionism. Two retrospective exhibitions of his work were organized during Gecan’s lifetime, and a large posthumous exhibition was held in 2005 at the Art Pavilion in Zagreb. Gecan received the Vladimir Nazor Award for Lifetime Achievement in 1967.

== Biography ==
Vilko Gecan was born 16 June 1894 in Kuželj near Brod na Kupi. In 1899 he travelled with his parents to Australia, returning to Croatia again in 1902. He attended school in Karlovac, Glogovnici, Zagreb, Dubica, and from 1910 the gymnasium in Banja Luka, where he met Milivoj Uzelac, with whom he developed a strong friendship that was to last throughout his life. In 1912–13, they both attended the private art school in Zagreb of Tomislav Krizman. In the autumn of 1913 Gecan moved to Munich, where he enrolled in the Academy of Fine Arts, Munich, as well as Heymann's private painting school.

At the beginning of the First World War, Gecan was drafted. At the Battle of Soči in July 1915, he was captured and spent the rest of the war in prisoner-of war camps on Sicily.

In 1919, he went to Prague with Milivoj Uzelac. That same year, they exhibited at the Zagreb Spring Salon, and later as part of the Group of Four (Gecan, Trepše, Uzelac, Varlaj). In 1921 Gecan held his first solo exhibition at the Art Pavilion. In 1922 he went to Berlin, where he studied stained glass techniques, and in 1924-28 he spent time in the United States (New York, Chicago). While there, he attended exhibitions of modern art, seeing the works of Cézanne and Picasso. In 1928, he stayed for a brief time in Paris with Uzelac.

By 1931, Gecan experienced the first symptoms of Parkinson's disease, a tremor in his right hand that would become stronger, increasingly hindering his ability to paint. In 1932, he returned to Zagreb, where he organized a solo exhibition in the Salon Ulrich. In 1935, aged 41, he enrolled in the Academy of Fine Arts, Zagreb, in order to formally earn his academic degree.

In 1964, a retrospective of his work was held at the Modern Gallery in Zagreb. In 1967 he received the Vladimir Nazor Award for lifetime achievement. In 1972, a further retrospective of Gecan's work was held at the Art Pavilion.

Vilko Gecan died on 25 June 1973 in Zagreb.

== Legacy ==
In the autumn of 1919, Gecan moved to Prague, joining Milivoj Uzelac, Vladimir Varlaj, Marijan Trepše, Ivo Režek and Frano Kršinić. Together they made the city an important reference for Croatian modern art. There, they picked up the new ideas of secessionism and expressionism, which they brought back to Croatian art.

Gecan's most important works were produced in the 1920s and 1930s. By 1921 the beginnings of expressionism were evident in his paintings and drawings. Miroslav Kraljević's legacy shows in the Klinik (Clinic) cycle, where cubism combined with realism and intense colour. His later work tended to be calmer, with less tension, more art deco stylization.

Gecan's early work shows free movement and the character stylization that would develop into his signature style. It is known that the first exhibition of Miroslav Kraljević's work in 1912 at the Ulrich Gallery in Zagreb had a significant impact on both Gecan and Uzelac. Gecan continued his education in Munich in 1913, where he broadened his artistic horizons. Gecan's war experience in prisoner-of-war camps had a lasting effect on him. His "Clinic" cycle of 1920, considered a masterpiece of Croatian expressionism, was based on a clinic in Prague, where Gecan was treated for kidney disease. But the paintings depict something closer to a mental hospital with dark characterisations, unsettling black and white rhythms, strange elongated figures, - enclosed spaces with strange characters trapped in them. His experiences in the camps permeated are key to understanding his paintings over the next few years. His uses of visual tension creates a state of anxiety.

The Cynic (Cinik), 1921

At the Spring Salon of 1921, Gecan exhibited the painting "Cinik" (The Cynic), which is now considered the most important work of Croatian Expressionist painting. This image derives from cubist and expressionist styles, symbolizing the world as a stage, and marked deformation of character. A young man in a red suit and bow tie sits at an oversized table with a shifted perspective that is tilted towards the viewer. He is reading Der Sturm, a newspaper that was known to promote expressionist art. The man in the picture is Gecan himself, who at the time was 27 years old. He looks cramped and awkward, the body language suggesting some inner turmoil, while the facial expression is a grimace.

Gecan's later paintings show a broader understanding of style and echoes of cubism, specifically the stylization of art deco. Unfortunately, his artistic development slowed as the symptoms of Parkinson's disease took hold. After spending some years in the United States, his work became softer, with a more conventional realism, and he created many still lifes and landscapes.

== Works ==
=== Paintings ===
- Mlinovi (Mills), 1919
- Self-portrait, 1920
- Ropstvo u Siciliji (Slavery in Sicily),1921
- Pejzažu (Landscape), 1921
- Portret Anuška Micić, 1921
- Cinik (The Cynic, Self-portrait), 1921
- Nove vijesti (News), 1922
- Kod rada (At Work)
- U krčmi (In the Tavern), 1922
- Kod stola (At the Table), 1923
- Self-portrait, 1923
- Portret Dr. Piskulica, 1928

=== Graphical illustrations ===
- Pobuna (Rebellion), 1914
- Dr. Dorić
- Bijesni (Angry)
- Gentelmen
- Glava (Head), 1920
- Klinik cycle (Clinic), 1921
- Advertising Poster for a Shipping Company (1928)

== Exhibitions ==
During his lifetime, Vilko Gecan held many solo exhibitions as well as participating in the Zagreb Spring Salon, and with the Group of Four.

=== Solo exhibitions ===
Recent exhibitions of his work include:

- 2005 Vilko Gecan retrospektiva, Art Pavilion Zagreb
- 1972 Vilko Gecan retrospektiva, Art Pavilion, Zagreb
- 1964 Vilko Gecan retrospektiva, Modern Gallery, Zagreb

=== Group exhibitions ===
- 2011 Passion and rebellion: Expressionism in Croatia, Klovićevi dvori, Zagreb
- 2007–2008 100 Prime Works Of Croatian Artists From The Collections Of The National Museum In Belgrade, Art Pavilion, Zagreb
- 2007 Iz fundusa galerije – Museum of Modern Art, Dubrovnik
- 2006 Croatian Collection – Museum of Contemporary Art, Skopje

=== Public collections ===
Vilko Gecan's work can be found in the following public collections

Croatia

- Filip Trade Collection
- Museum of Contemporary Art, Zagreb
- Gallery of Fine Arts, Split
- Museum of Modern Art, Dubrovnik

Macedonia

- Museum of Contemporary Art, Skopje

== Bibliography ==
- Vilko Gecan by Joza Ladovic. Published by Art studio Azinovic D.O.O (1997). Croatian. ISBN 953-6271-17-6. ISBN 978-953-6271-17-7
- Vilko Gecan. Monograph by Zvonko Maković. Published Matica hrvatska, Zagreb, 1997. ISBN 953-150-111-4. ISBN 978-953-150-111-8
