= Anton Bettelheim =

Austrian critic and journalist (1851–1930)

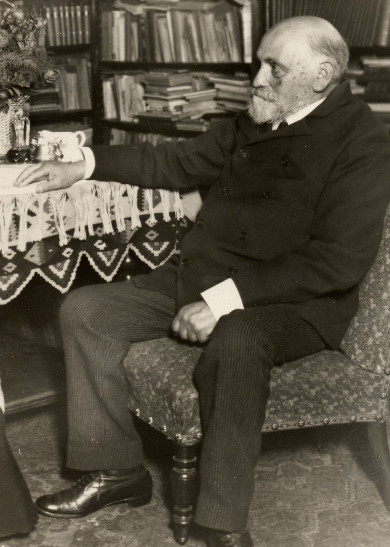
Anton Bettelheim

Anton Bettelheim (18 November 1851 in Vienna – 29 March 1930 in Vienna) was an Austrian critic and journalist.

== Life and career ==
He was born to a Jewish family and studied law, and for some time was engaged in active practise, but abandoned the profession for a literary career. Although he had received his degree of "doctor of law", he attended the lectures of Giesebrecht and Michael Bernays at Munich on literary subjects. Fired by the eloquence and enthusiasm of the latter, he undertook the study of Beaumarchais' life and writings, and, to this end, resolved to make original investigations in the libraries of London, Paris, The Hague, Carlsruhe, and Spain. After an extended tour through Germany, France, England, and Spain, Bettelheim became, in 1880, the feuilleton editor of the Vienna "Presse". He retained this position until 1884, when he became editor of the "Deutsche Wochenschrift". In 1886, he joined the editorial staff of the "Deutsche Zeitung", which position he resigned shortly after to publish the "Biographische Blätter", subsequently issued as "Biographisches Jahrbuch und Deutscher Nekrolog".

Bettelheim was married to the writer and graphic Helene Bettelheim-Gabillon (1857–1946), a daughter of the actors-couple Ludwig (1828–1896) and Zerline (1834–1892) Gabillon. Their children, Ministerialrat Dr. Ludwig Bettelheim-Gabillon and Friederike Bunzel were murdered in Theresienstadt concentration camp.

== Works ==
- "Beaumarchais," a biography, 1886;
- a translation of Littré's "Wie ich mein Wörterbuch der französischen Sprache zu Stande gebracht habe," 1887;
- "Volkstheater und Lokalbühne," 1887;
- "Ludwig Anzengruber, der Mann, sein Werk, seine Weltanschauung," 1891 (2d edition 1898) – Ludwig Anzengruber, the man, his work and worldview.
- "Die Zukunft unseres Volkstheaters," 1892;
- "Deutsche und Franzosen," 1895
- "Acta Diurna, Gesammelte Aufsätze," 1899.

Bettelheim edited "Führende Geister", 1890–97, and was also one of the editors of Ludwig Anzengruber's complete works, published by Cotta, 1890.

== Family ==
He was a younger brother of Caroline von Gomperz-Bettelheim.

== See also ==
- Bettelheim

== Notes and references ==
- This work in turn cites:
  - Das Geistige Wien, 1893, p. 34
  - Kürschner, Deutscher Literatur-Kalender, 1901, pp. 98, 99
- Bettelheim, Anton. In: Österreichisches Biographisches Lexikon 1815–1950 (ÖBL). Band 1, Verlag der Österreichischen Akademie der Wissenschaften, Wien 1954, ISBN 3-7001-0128-7, pp. 78–79.
- Wolfgang Fritz, Fortschritt und Barbarei, Münster 2010.ISBN 978-3-643-50247-6 p. 75.
