= Josip Horvat Međimurec =

Croatian painter

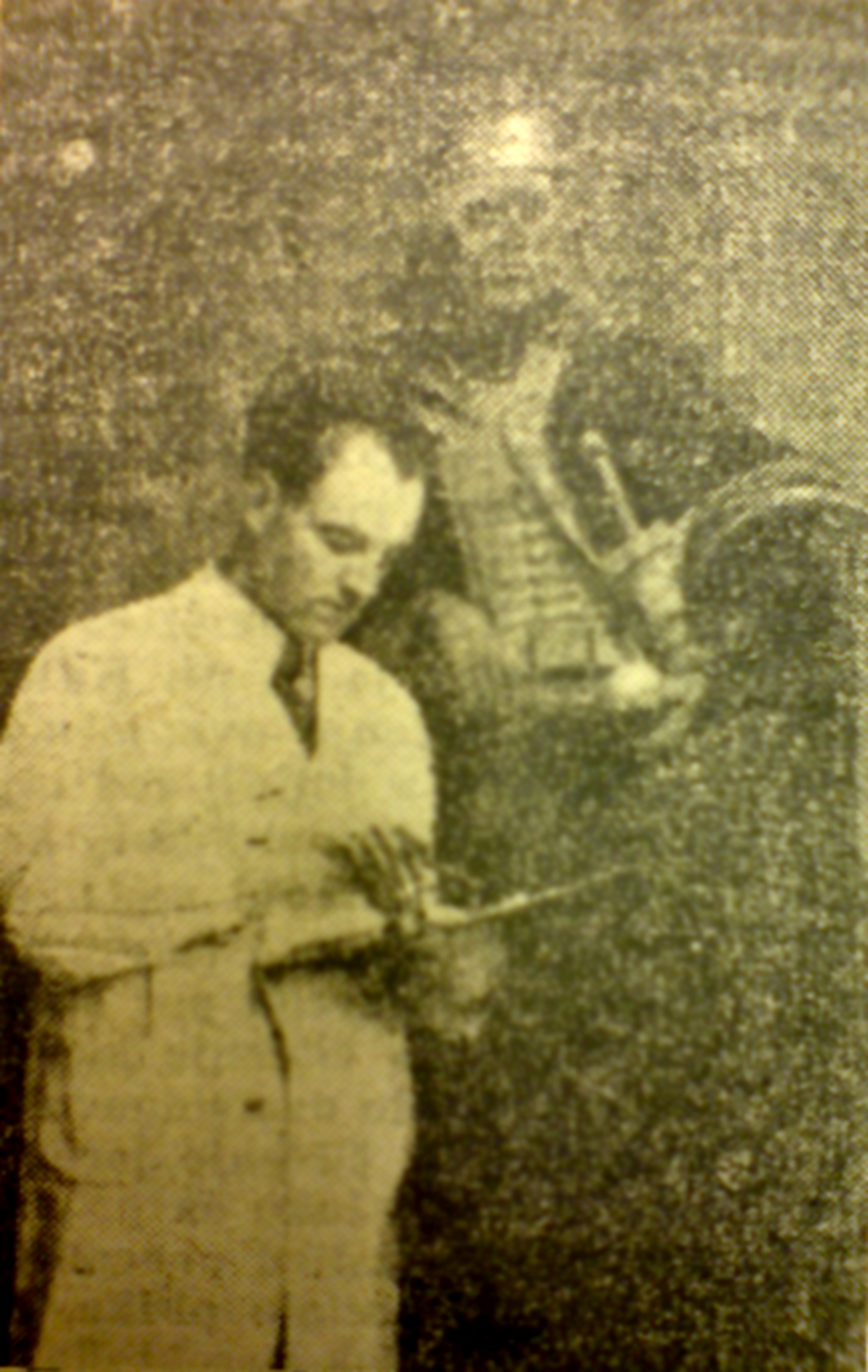
- Josip Horvat Međimurec in front of his picture "King Tomislav at throne", newspaper photography from February 1941.
- Born: 18 February 1904; Čakovec, Kingdom of Croatia-Slavonia, Austria-Hungary
- Died: 2 June 1945 (aged 41); Zagreb, FS Croatia, DF Yugoslavia
- Known for: Painter
- Notable work: Coronation of king Tomislav, King Tomislav at throne, Decease of Petar Svačić – battle below Gvozd, Petar Kružić defeats the Turkish army
- Patrons: Antun Ullrich

Josip Horvat (Croatian pronunciation: [jǒsip xǒrʋat medʑimǔːrets]; 18 February 1904 – 2 June 1945) was a Croatian painter.

== Early life ==
Horvat was born to Dragutin and Marija Horvat in Čakovec. He attended elementary school in Čakovec, and grade school in Nagykanizsa and Pest. He then attended the Academy of Fine Arts Vienna from 1917 to 1923.

== Life and work ==
He started working in Zagreb in 1924, supported by patron Antun Ullrich, and worked there until his death, shortly after the Second World War. Having been accused of collaboration with authorities of the Independent State of Croatia, he was executed by the Yugoslav Partisans, without trial.

Horvat illustrated the following books:

- Dragutin Nemet: "Prince Zoran"
- Mark Šeparović: "Croatian history grandfather granddaughter"
- Milutin Majer: "Tatars in Croatia"

He also illustrated novels Marija Jurić Zagorka coming out in installments in Jutarnji list 1929 to 1931.

== Exhibitions ==
- Art Pavilion in Zagreb 16.-30. XI. 1928.;
- Drawing room Ullrich 25. XI. – 4. XII. 1936.;
- Drawing room Ullrich 16.-28. II. 1941.;
- Strossmayerova galerija 22. VII. – 11. VIII. 1942 "Pictorial impressions from battlefield";
- Art Pavilion in Zagreb 22. XI. – 13. XII. 1942. "II Exhibitions Croatian arts in the Independent State of Croatia";
- Art Pavilion in Zagreb 10. – 31. X. 1943. "III Exhibitions Croatian arts in the Independent State of Croatia";
- Art Pavilion in Zagreb 17. VI. – 9. VII. 1944. "IV Exhibitions Croatian arts in the Independent State of Croatia".

=== Exhibitions after death ===
- Historical painting in Croatia", Zagreb 1969. (Picture "Coronation of Croatian king Tomislav", 1938., Croatian Historical Museum)
- Towns and countryside on pictures and drawing from 1800. to 1940", Zagreb 1977. (Picture "Old Town Sisak", 1944. Study for picture overview battle with Sisak, Croatian Historical Museum)

== Selected works ==
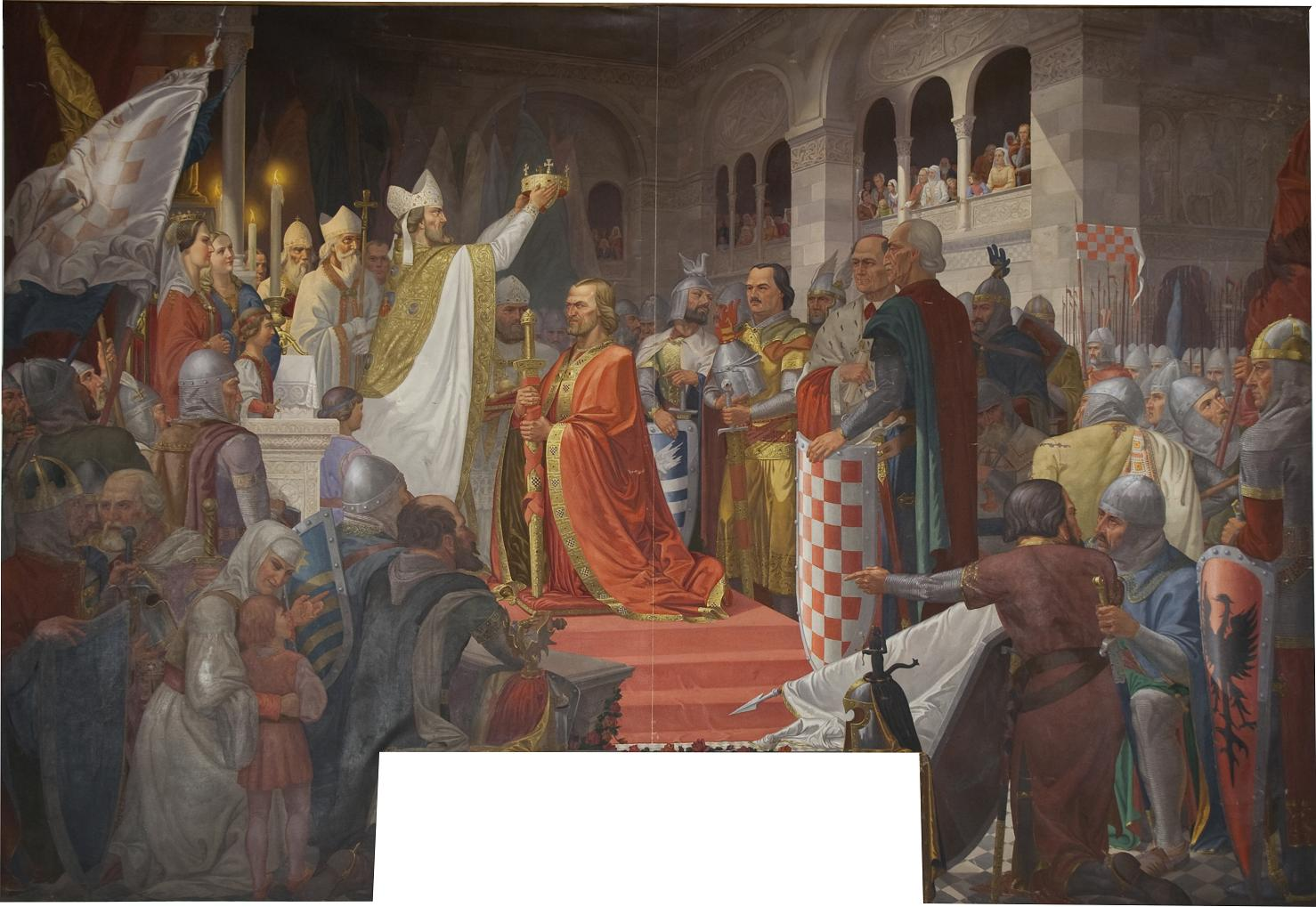
The Coronation of King Tomislav, oil on canvas, 1938

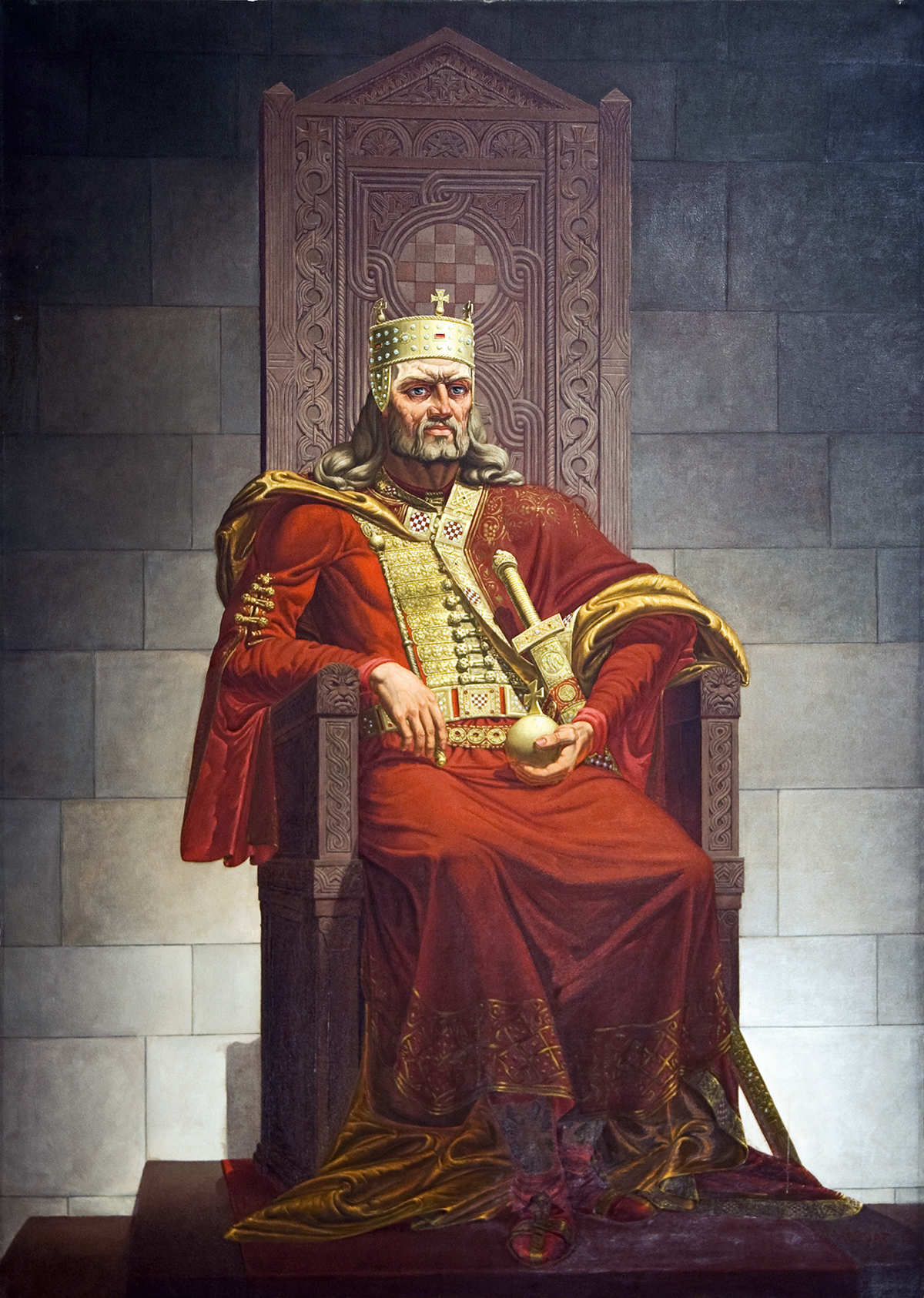
King Tomislav at His Throne, oil on canvas, February 1941.

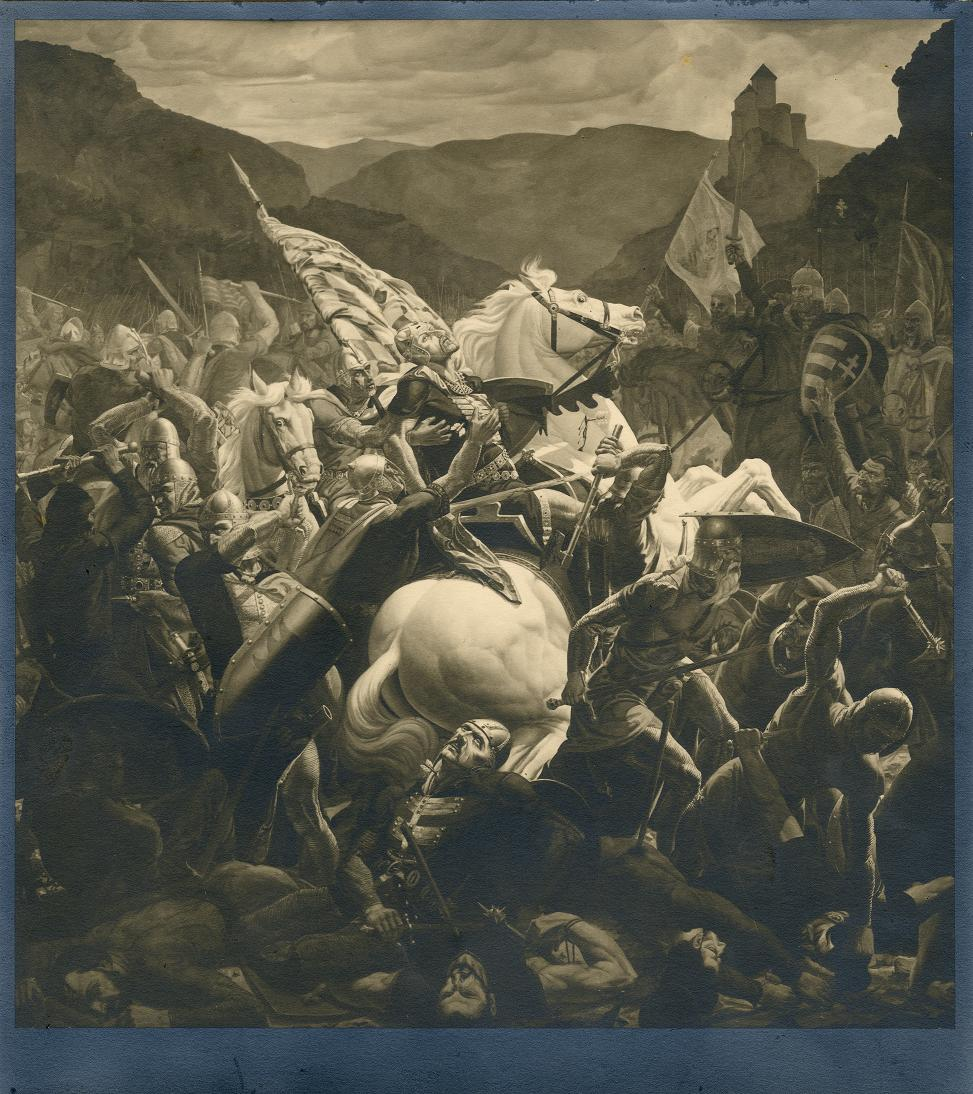
The Death of Petar Svačić – The Battle at Gvozd, 1941, oil on canvas.

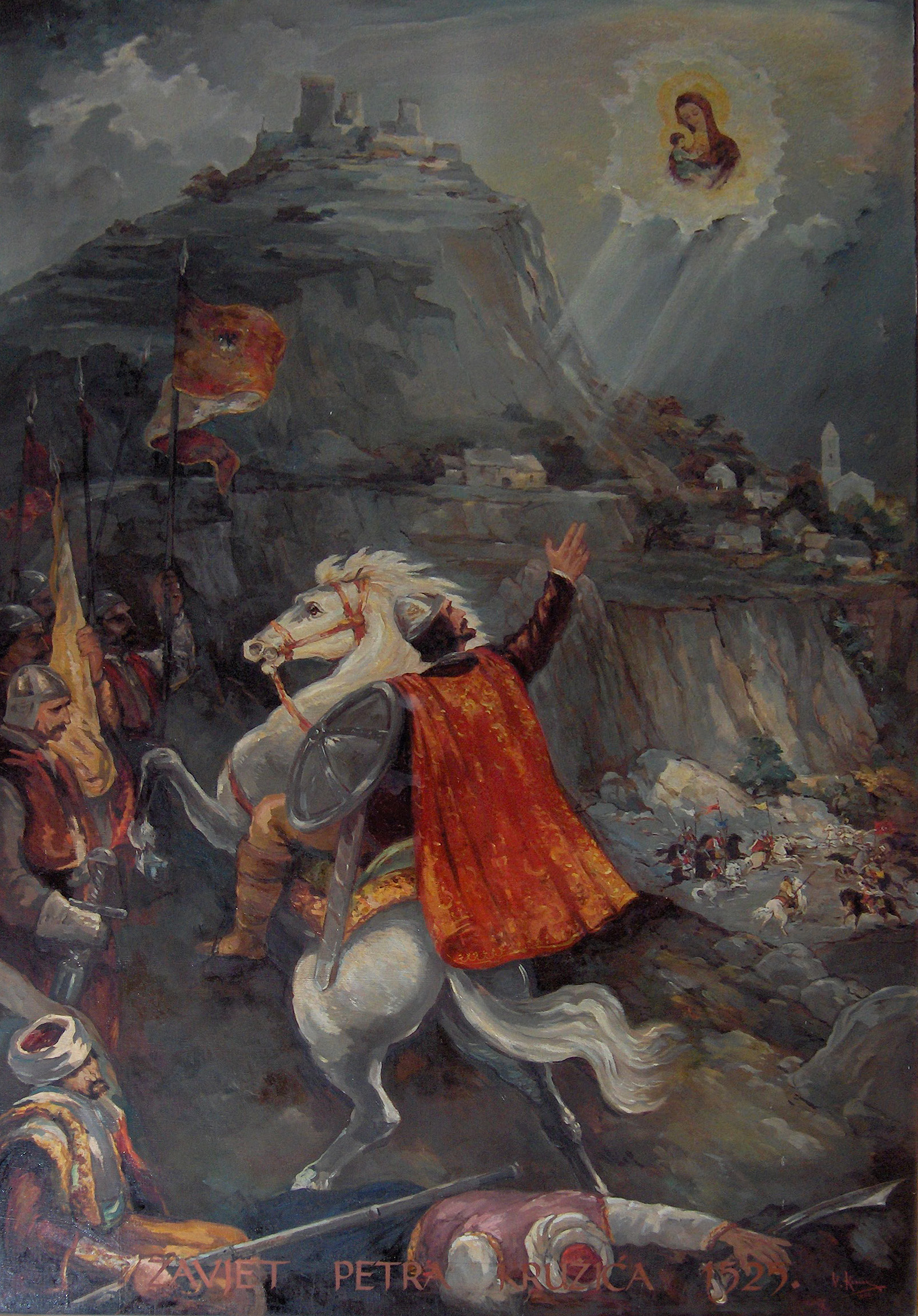
Petar Kružić Defeats the Turkish Army, oil on canvas
