= Domin =

Domin may refer to:

- Domin of Veinne (died 536), French bishop and saint
- Friedrich Domin (1902–1961), German film actor
- Hilde Domin (1909–2006), German lyric poet and writer
- Jerónimo Domín Funes (1576–1650), Spanish Roman Catholic bishop
- Josip Franjo Domin (1754–1819), Croatian-Hungarian physicist, priest and physician
- Karel Domin (1882–1953), Czech botanist (standard author abbreviation Domin) and politician
- Domin Sport, a Polish cycling team
