= Dubravka Zubović =

Croatian opera singer

Dubravka Zubović is a retired opera singer and voice teacher in Orange County, California, United States.

== History ==
Dubravka Zubović was born in Zagreb, Croatia, former SFR Yugoslavia where she began her voice studies at the age of 14, graduating from Zagreb Academy of Music with a B.A. degree. Shortly after, she became a leading mezzo of the Belgrade Opera in Belgrade, Serbia.

In 1977, Zubovic graduated with an M.A. degree from the University of Belgrade, Serbia.

From 1977 to 1978, she studied at Il Teatro all Scala di Milano with Gina Cigna and Ettore Campogalliani. Her longtime mentor was renowned soprano Zinka Milanov until Milanov's death.

== Career ==
Zubovic is a recipient of many prestigious awards from singing competitions in Barcelona (Spain), Vienna (Austria), Ostend (Belgium), etc. During her 25-year career, she performed all over the world, including the USA, Australia, Latin America and on many stages in Europe. Her repertory includes opera, Lieder and oratorio.

In 1987, Zubovic made her debut at Carnegie Hall in New York City. She sang with the Pacific Opera at the Costa Mesa Performing Arts Center.

In January 2010 -2014, Zubovic joined the Saddleback College Music Department, as an adjunct professor of applied voice and a language coach. Zubovic is a member of NATS (National Association of Teachers of Singing) and MTAC (Music Teachers' Association of California). She is a frequent judicator at the national and international vocal competitions, holds master classes at the universities and frequently teaches at UC Irvine, California

D. Zubovic runs a private voice studio in Laguna Niguel,[ Orange County, California. Her students are the winners of the international and national vocal competitions (NATS, MTAC, American Protégé International Vocal Competition, etc.), and have been accepted to prestigious Universities and Music Conservatories throughout the USA.

In 2012. Dubravka Zubovic founded OC Ars Vocalis/OCAVA, a three-week summer program in Rome, Italy, which is offered to the classical music singers.

== Other sources ==
- Crutchfield, Will, "Review: Giordano's 'Chenier' In Concert", The New York Times, March 18, 1988
- Radio-televizija Srbije, "Osma vrata", December 25, 2008
