= Jakob Bettelheim =

Jewish Austrian-German dramatist, writer, translator

Jacob Bettelheim, German: Jakob Bettelheim (pseudonym: Karl Tellheim; 24 (26) October 1841, Vienna – 13 July 1909, Berlin) was a Jewish Austrian-German dramatist, writer, translator.

He attained considerable prominence by his first attempt in the field of literature, "Elena Taceano", a romance. This he followed with "Intime Geschichten" (novelettes) and a drama, "Nero," written in collaboration with Von Schönthan in 1889. After "Die Praktische Frau," a farce, came "Giftmischer" and "Vater Morin," two popular plays; 2 dramas, "Ehelüge" and "Sein Bester Freund"; "Madame Kukuk," a farce; "Syrenen," a popular play; "Seine Gewesene," farce; "Aus der Elite," farce, 1894; "Der Millionenbauer," drama, in collaboration with M. Kretzer; "Verklärung," drama, 1897; "Verklärung," farce, 1898; "Der Retter," comedy, 1898.

Among other works by Bettelheim may be mentioned: "Onkel Jonas," a popular drama, in collaboration with O. Klein, 1898; "Victorinen's Hochzeit" (translated from Georges Sand's play), 1879; "Marguerite" (from Sardou), 1886; "Der Erbe" (from De Maupassant), 1894; and "Im Verdacht" (from Labiche).
