= Caroline von Gomperz-Bettelheim =

Austrian opera singer

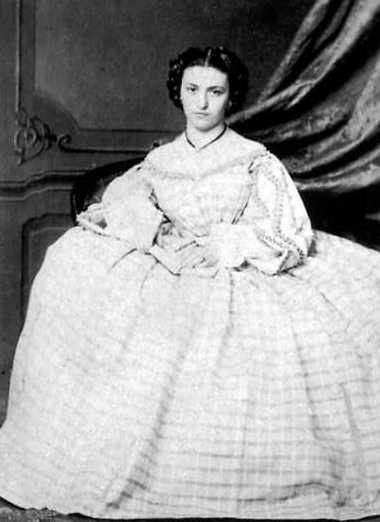

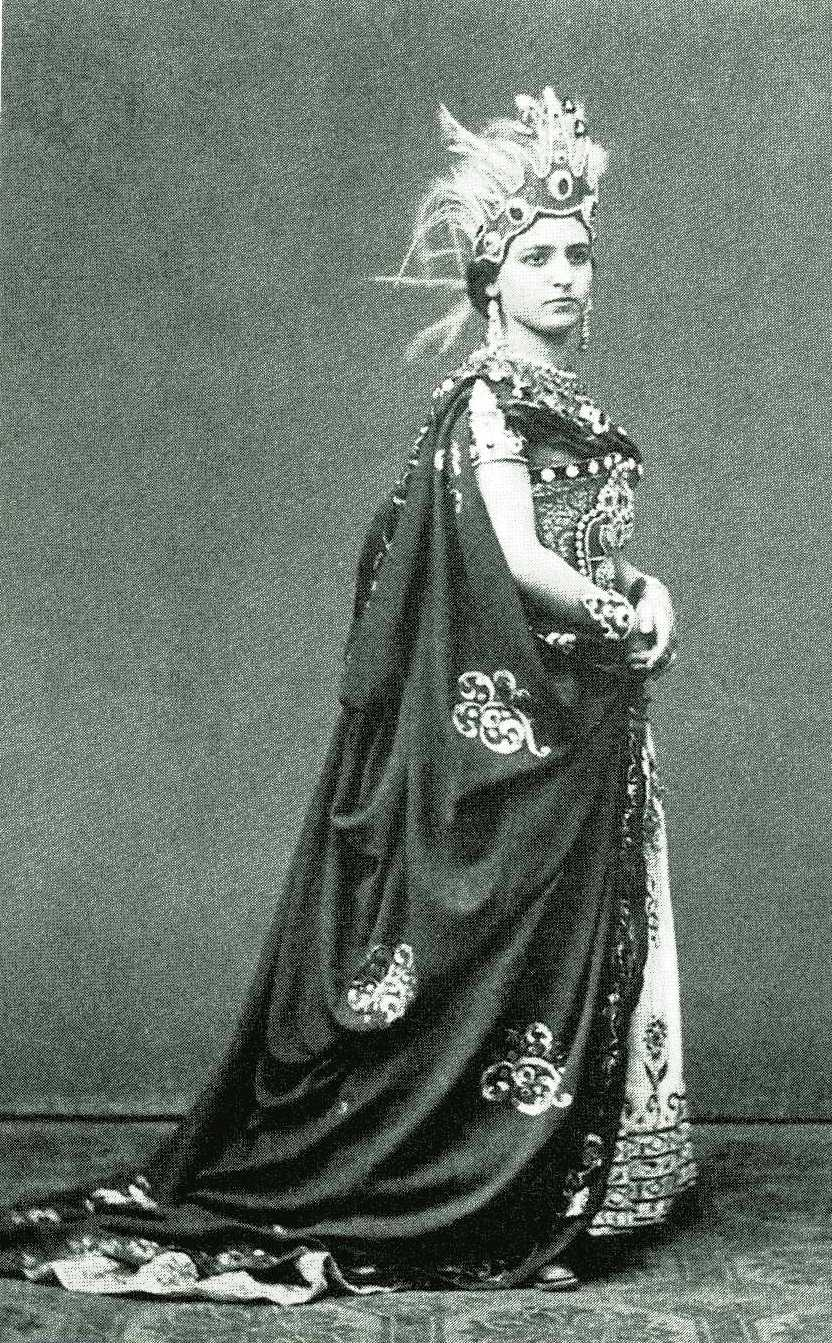

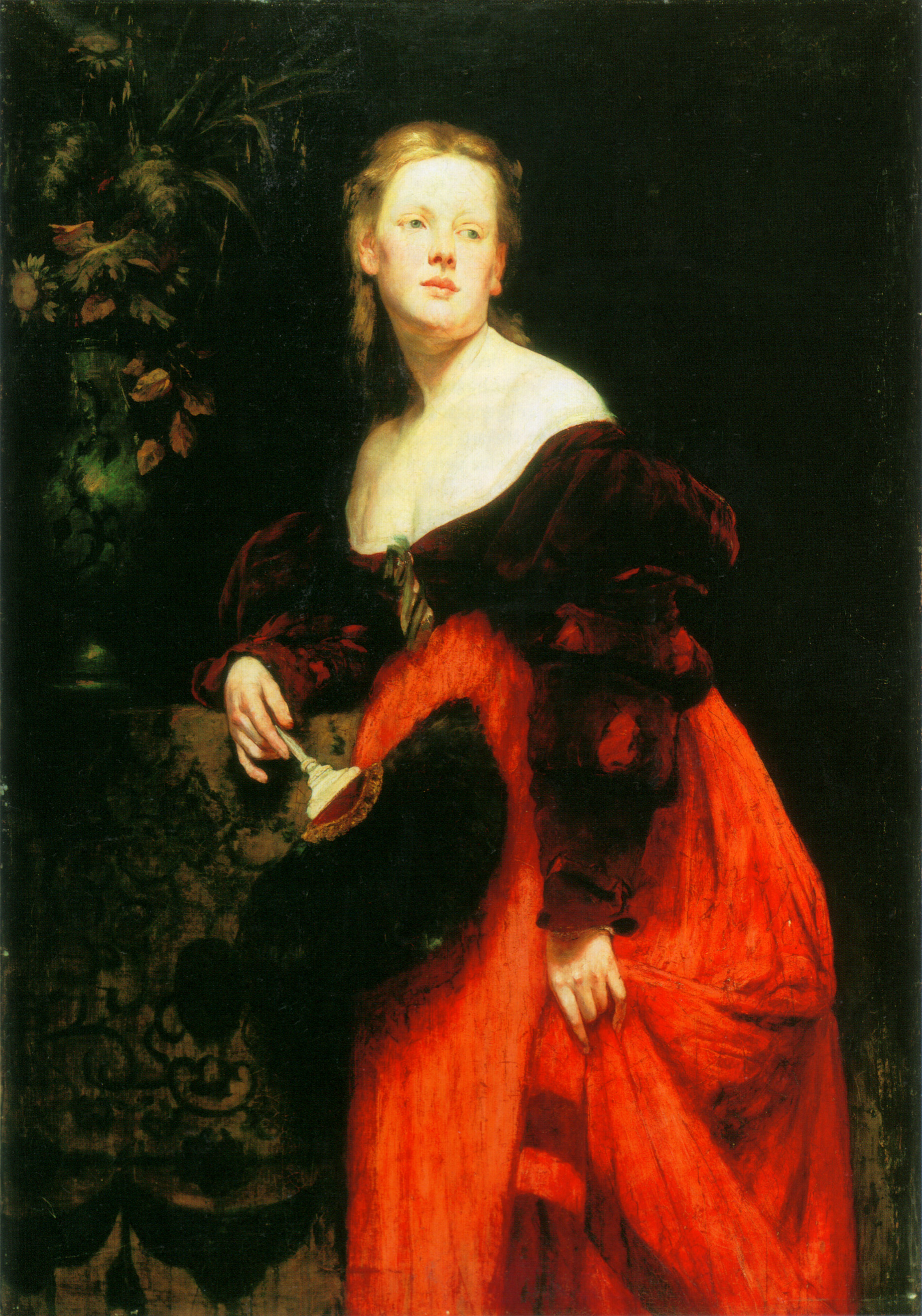
by Hans Makart

Caroline von Gomperz-Bettelheim, or C(K)aroline Bettelheim, pseudonym: Tellheim (Hungarian: Bettelheim-Gomperz Caroline; 1 June 1845, in Pest – 13 December 1925, in Vienna) was a Hungarian-Austrian court singer and member of the Royal Opera, Vienna. Her younger brother was Anton Bettelheim.

She was born at Pest (Budapest), Hungary. She studied pianoforte with Karl Goldmark, and singing with Moritz Laufer. At the age of 14, she made her début as a pianist, and two years later appeared for the first time in opera at Vienna. She eventually obtained a permanent engagement at the Royal Opera in that city. She occasionally starred in her favorite rôles in other cities of (Germany) as well as in London. She was the wife of Julius Ritter von Gomperz, president of the Austrian chamber of commerce and member of the Upper House.

Anton Rubinstein dedicated to Gomperz-Bettelheim his composition Hecuba, Op. 92, no. 1 (aria for mezzo-soprano and orchestra).
