= Zinka Milanov =

Croatian operatic dramatic soprano

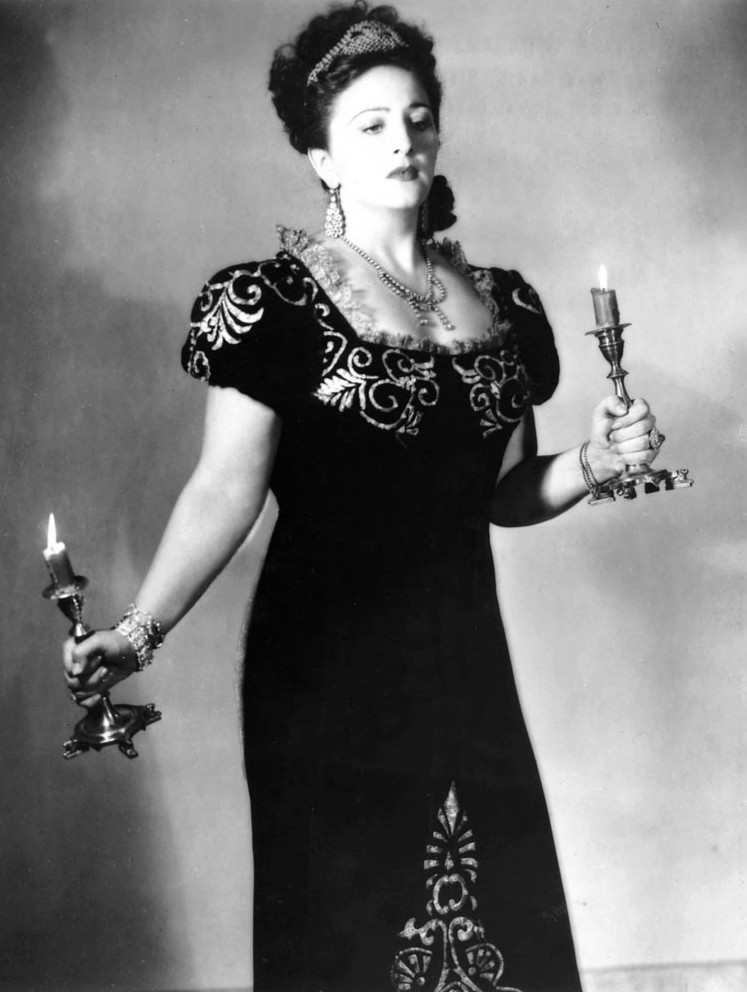
- Milanov performing in Tosca, 1946
- Born: Zinka Kunc; May 17, 1906; Zagreb, Kingdom of Croatia-Slavonia, Austria-Hungary
- Died: May 30, 1989 (aged 83); Manhattan, New York City, US
- Occupation: Opera singer
- Years active: 1929–1989

Zinka Milanov (Croatian pronunciation: [zîːŋka milǎnoʋ]; May 17, 1906 – May 30, 1989) was a Croatian operatic dramatic soprano who had a major career centered on the Metropolitan Opera in New York City. After finishing her education in Zagreb, Milanov made her debut in 1927 in Ljubljana as Leonora in Giuseppe Verdi's Il Trovatore. From 1928 to 1936, she was the leading soprano of the Croatian National Theatre. In 1937, Milanov performed at the Metropolitan Opera for the first time, where she continued to sing until 1966. She also performed as a concert singer and was a noted vocal coach and teacher. Milanov is the sister of the composer and pianist Božidar Kunc.

== Biography ==
Born in Zagreb, Croatia as Zinka Kunc (pronounced [zîːŋka kûnt͡s]), she studied with the Wagnerian soprano Milka Ternina and her assistant Marija Kostrenčić. She also studied in Milan with Fernando Carpi and in Berlin with Jacques Stückgold. On October 29, 1927, she made her operatic debut as Leonora in Giuseppe Verdi's Il Trovatore in Ljubljana, Slovenia, at age 21. Her debut in her native Croatia, at the National Theatre in Zagreb, took place five weeks later as Marguerite in Charles Gounod's Faust.

After an early debut in Dresden (November 5, 1928, also as Leonora), her teacher, Ternina, was not pleased and much work commenced to perfect her technique. She performed in Zagreb and Ljubljana almost exclusively for the next six years. Later she became a member of the New German Theatre in Prague, where all performances were sung in German. She was discovered there by Bruno Walter, who recommended her to Arturo Toscanini for a performance of Verdi's Requiem in Salzburg.

In 1937, the soprano made her debut at the Metropolitan Opera, once again as Leonora. At that time she adopted the name Milanov, the stage name of her second husband, an actor. According to Milanov herself, "Kunc" wasn't "glamorous" enough for the Metropolitan Opera. The 2004 Opera News article "Zinka Takes Off" stated that the name change was deemed necessary since the gentlemen at the Met feared the "implications inherent in what they predicted would be the standard American mispronunciation — but they were never forthright with her about it". On November 8, 1937, Erich Simon, who was in charge of engaging Milanov, cabled Edward Ziegler, the assistant manager of the Met, "Mme Zinka KUNZ-MARCOVIC has informed me that she wishes to perform under her husband's stage name, MILANOV."

In 1940, Milanov was one of the featured soloists in a radio performance of Beethoven's Missa Solemnis, along with Jussi Björling (tenor), Alexander Kipnis (bass), Bruna Castagna (mezzo), and the Westminster Choir. Toscanini conducted the NBC Symphony Orchestra.

In 1947, she left the Met when she married, for the third time, to Yugoslav general and diplomat Ljubomir Ilić, and returned to live in Yugoslavia. She was at the peak of her artistic and vocal powers when she made her debut at the Teatro alla Scala as Tosca in 1950. Milanov returned to the Metropolitan Opera the same year, invited by Rudolf Bing in his first year there as general manager.

She gave her final performance in 1966 at the closing night of the old Metropolitan Opera House. Having worked as a voice teacher while still performing, Milanov devoted herself to teaching after her retirement. Among her pupils were Betty Allen, Grace Bumbry, Christa Ludwig, Regina Resnik, Dubravka Zubović and Milka Stojanovic. Composer Richard Hundley was one of her studio pianists. She recorded prolifically from the 1940s through to the 1960s. Her voice was well-suited to Italian operas such as those of Verdi, Ponchielli, Puccini and the verismo composers. She died at Lenox Hill Hospital in Manhattan on May 30, 1989, following a stroke, aged 83.

== Discography ==
- Verdi: Il trovatore - Zinka Milanov, Jussi Björling, Fedora Barbieri, Leonard Warren, Nicola Moscona; Robert Shaw Chorale, RCA Victor Orchestra, Renato Cellini, RCA Victor, 1952.
- Verdi: Aida - Zinka Milanov, Jussi Björling, Fedora Barbieri, Leonard Warren, Boris Christoff; Rome Opera Orchestra and Chorus, Jonel Perlea, RCA Victor, 1955.
- Mascagni: Cavalleria rusticana - Zinka Milanov, Jussi Björling, Robert Merrill; Robert Shaw Chorale, RCA Victor Orchestra, Renato Cellini, RCA Victor, 1953.
- Puccini: Tosca - Zinka Milanov, Jussi Björling, Leonard Warren; Rome Opera Orchestra and Chorus, Erich Leinsdorf, RCA Victor, 1957.
- Rossini: Stabat Mater - Zinka Milanov, Risë Stevens, Nicolai Gedda, Nicola Rossi-Lemeni; Westminster Choir (choir master: John Finley Williamson); NBC Symphony Orchestra, Arturo Toscanini, RCA Victor, 1952.
- Verdi: La forza del destino - Zinka Milanov, Giuseppe di Stefano, Leonard Warren, Rosalind Elias, Giorgio Tozzi; Coro e Orchestra dell'Accademia di Santa Cecilia, Rome, Fernando Previtali, RCA Victor/DECCA, 1958.
- Ponchielli: La Gioconda - Zinka Milanov, Giuseppe di Stefano, Leonard Warren, Rosalind Elias, Plinio Clabassi; Coro e Orchestra dell'Accademia di Santa Cecilia, Rome, Fernando Previtali, RCA Victor/DECCA, 1957.
- Verdi: La forza del destino (live broadcast, March 17, 1956). Milanov, Rosalind Elias, Richard Tucker, Leonard Warren, Cesare Siepi; Fritz Stiedry, Metropolitan Opera, New York
- Verdi: Simon Boccanegra (live broadcast, April 2, 1960). Milanov, Carlo Bergonzi, Frank Guarrera, Giorgio Tozzi, Dimitri Mitropoulos; Metropolitan Opera
- Verdi: Un ballo in maschera (live broadcast, January 22, 1955). Milanov, Richard Tucker, Josef Metternich, Jean Madeira, Roberta Peters; Dimitri Mitropoulos, Metropolitan Opera
- Verdi: Un ballo in maschera (live broadcast, December 10, 1955). Milanov, Jan Peerce, Robert Merrill, Marian Anderson, Roberta Peters; Dimitri Mitropoulos, Metropolitan Opera

== Bibliography ==
- The Last Prima Donnas, by Lanfranco Rasponi, Alfred A Knopf, 1982. ISBN 0-394-52153-6
