= Marijan Trepše =

Croatian painter, graphic artist and set designer (1887–1964)

- Born: 25 March 1887; Zagreb, Kingdom of Croatia-Slavonia, Austria-Hungary
- Died: 4 October 1964 (aged 77); Zagreb, SR Croatia, SFR Yugoslavia
- Education: Prague, Paris
- Known for: painting, graphics, stained glass, scenography
- Movement: expressionist

Marijan Trepše (25 March 1887 – 4 October 1964) was a Croatian painter, graphic artist and set designer, considered to be one of the key figures in Croatian art in the early part of the 20th century. In 1919 the seventh exhibition of the Spring Salon opened at the Crafts school in Zagreb. Exhibiting for the first time together, Milivoj Uzelac, Vilko Gecan, Marijan Trepše and Vladimir Varlaj dominated the exhibit with their expressionist works. The Prague Four, as they became known, had returned to Zagreb that year from their studies at the Prague academy and the work of these young painters brought in new expressionist ideas that were to dominate the Croatian art scene of the 1920s.

Together with Gecan, Uzelac and Varlaj, with whom he was later to exhibit as the Group of Four, Marijan Trepše represents the link through which Miroslav Kraljević’s style evolved into expressionism. Trepše’s own art moved from early expressionist and classicist inspirations to more open colour and freedom of gesture. His early work was characterised by interiors with figures, generally featuring a single woman. After 1933, he created a series of landscapes from around Zagreb and motifs from the south, and worked as a set designer for the Croatian National Theatre in Zagreb.

== Biography ==
Marijan Trepše was born in Zagreb on 25 March 1887. He attended the High School for Arts Crafts in Zagreb (1914–1918), where he studied under Bela Čikoš Sesija. His studies continued at the Academy of Fine Arts in Prague with Max Švabinský, then from 1920 to 1922, in Paris, at the Académie de la Grande Chaumière.

From 1919, Marijan Trepše exhibited his work at the Zagreb Spring Salon, and later as part of the Group of Four (Gecan, Trepše, Uzelac, Varlaj). In 1926 he was awarded a gold medal for art in an international exhibition in Philadelphia.

From 1925 until his retirement in 1956 he worked as a set designer at the Croatian National Theatre in Zagreb, and between 1926 and 1931 he taught at the National Crafts School in Zagreb. From 1950, he worked with the Zadar and Zagreb Puppet Theatres.

Marijan Trepše died 4 October 1964 in Zagreb.

== Legacy ==
Trepše is one of those artists who achieved his best work in his youth. Although Trepše was educated at the Zagreb Academy of Bela Čikoš Sesija, his early work shows no traces of the Art Nouveau and Symbolism of his teacher. After graduating from Zagreb, in the autumn of 1918 he moved to Prague, where Milivoj Uzelac had been since 1915. Vladimir Varlaj and Vilko Gecan also arrived in Prague, meeting up with Ivo Režek and Frano Kršinić to make the city an important reference for Croatian modern art. From there, they picked up the new ideas of secessionism and expressionism, which they brought back to Croatian art.

An important influence on Trepše and his contemporaries was the artist Miroslav Kraljević, who had died in 1913, aged only 27. While Kraljević had depicted wealthy gentlemen in the company of courtesans in Paris, Trepše and his fellow artists in Prague showed working people. A typical scene in Trepše's paintings had sombre men in hats sitting around a wooden table in a bar, playing cards and drinking, some fallen asleep where they sat. The place is obscurely lit, full of smoke, and there is usually just one woman in the company.

A large retrospective exhibit of his works opened in 2010 in the Art Pavilion, Zagreb. It included works in oils, watercolour and prints, as well as some of his original designs for theatre sets. More comprehensive than the previous retrospective held at the same venue in 1975, the exhibit provided the opportunity for a new reading of Trepše's work. In fact, much of his work was not generally known to the public, and this was the first showing for some of his best works. According to the art historian Zvonko Matković, who was responsible for organizing the exhibit, Marijan Trepše belongs among the most important Croatian artists of the first half of the 20th century. He was one of those who revived the style of Miroslav Kraljević, and took it closer to expressionism. Together with his contemporaries (Uzelac, Gecan and Varlaj) he brought important changes to the Spring Salon, a key part of the development of art in Croatia between the World wars.

Trepše's output was diverse. He is considered one of the best graphic artists in the years immediately after World War I. In the early 1920s in Paris, classicist tendencies had emerged, with the rounded solid forms which can be seen in much of Trepše's art. Derain and Picasso were important references of the time. In the mid-1920s Trepše began to work in stained glass for which he received many commissions. His most important work Calvary (Golgota), which in 1935 was placed in the chapel of the suffering of Jesus (Trpećeg Isusa) in Zagreb. In 1925 he began work at the Croatian National Theatre in Zagreb, at a time when set design was developing in exciting new directions.

== Works ==
=== Paintings ===
- Olive Tree (Maslinik), 1919
- Calvary (Golgota), 1920
- Portrait of Krleža (Portret Krleže), 1920
- Portrait of a Boy (Portret dječaka), 1920
- Self-portrait (Autoportret), around 1920
- Spring (U prirodi), 1921
- Ilich Square (Ilički trg), 1921
- Card Player (Kartaš), 1920/21
- Woman Before Sleeping (Žena prije spavanja), 1921/22
- Woman with Jar (Žena s vrčem), 1926
- Reclining Woman (Žena koja leži)
- Woman with Fan (Dama s lepezom), 1930
- Woman with Cat (Žena s mačkom), 1931
- Village (Selo), 1930s

=== Graphical illustrations ===
- From Tales of Hoffmann (Iz Hoffmannovih priča), 1919
- From Cabaret (Iz cabareta), 1919
- Murder (Ubojstvo), 1919
- Thunderbird (Grom), 1919
- The Afflicted (Bijednici), 1919
- Samson and Delila (Samson i Dalila), 1919
- We Want Barrabas (Hoćemo Barabu), 1919

=== Theatrical set designs ===
Sets and costumes for National Theatre productions, including

- Calderon's Gospođe Đavolice, 1925
- Johnny plays (Johnny svira), 1928
- Maruf's H. Rabauda (1929)
- Bone (Koštana), 1931
- Samson and Delila (Samson i Dalila), 1937
- Stonemason (Kamenik) 1946/1947
- Equinox (Ekvinocij), 1950/1951

== Exhibitions ==
During his lifetime, Marijan Trepše exhibited in the Zagreb Spring Salon, and with the Group of Four.

=== Solo exhibitions ===
Recent exhibitions of his work include:

- 2010-2011 Marijan Trepše retrospektiva, Art Pavilion Zagreb
- 1975 Marijan Trepše - Art Pavilion, Zagreb

=== Group exhibitions ===
- 1997 Realism of the 1920s: Magic, Classic, Objective in Croatian Art. ArTresor Studio, Zagreb
- 1980 Expressionism and Croatian Art, Art Pavilion Zagreb

=== Public Collections ===
Marijan Trepše's work can be found in the following public collections

Croatia

- Museum of Contemporary Art, Zagreb
- Gallery of Fine Arts, Split
- Gallery of Fine Arts, Osijek
- Museum of Modern and Contemporary Art, Rijeka

Serbia

- Museum of Contemporary Art, Belgrade
