= Johann Friedrich Cotta =

Johann Friedrich Cotta may refer to:

- Johann Friedrich Cotta (publisher)
- Johann Friedrich Cotta (theologian)
