= Leopold Bettelheim =

Hungarian physician

Leopold Bettelheim (Hungarian: Bettelheim Leopold, Bettelheim Meyer Léb, Yiddish: Meyer Leb Bettelheim; 23 February 1777, Galgócz – 9 April 1838) was a Hungarian medical doctor.

He was not only eminent in his profession, but was considered a Hebraist of some importance. He lived in Galgócz (German: Freystadtl, today Hlohovec, Slovakia) next to the river Vág (German: Waag) and there held the responsible office of physician-in-ordinary to Count Joseph Erdödy, the influential court chancellor of Hungary, in whose private residence are still preserved the surgical instruments used by Bettelheim in saving the lives of the count and his family, together with documents recording some remarkable cures effected by him.

In 1830 Bettelheim was the recipient of a gold medal of honor from the emperor Francis I for distinguished services to the royal family and to the nobility.
