= Božidar Kunc =

Croatian composer and pianist

- Born: July 18, 1903; Zagreb, Croatia
- Died: April 1, 1964 (aged 60)
- Genres: Classical music
- Occupations: Composer, pianist

Božidar Kunc (July 18, 1903, Zagreb – April 1, 1964, Detroit) was a Croatian composer and pianist. He studied at the Academy of Music, University of Zagreb. From 1951 he worked as a teacher in New York. His sister was a famous soprano Zinka Milanov (maiden name Kunc).

== Biography ==
Božidar Kunc was born on July 18, 1903, in Zagreb, the fourth child of accountant Rudolf Kunc (1867–1932), a scion of the Kunz van der Rosen family of Graz, and Ljubica Smičiklas (1873–1936). Apart from Božidar, only Mira Tereza Zinka (May 17, 1906 – May 30, 1989), later a celebrated opera singer, was to attain adulthood.

Božidar grew up in a musical atmosphere encouraged by his musical father (he played the cello and also sang), who gave him an exemplary musical education. He started to compose when he was 12, and from the age of 18 he did this systematically and continuously. Although in 1926 he had completed his four-year course of studies in law, the emphasis of his interest lay in music, which he studied at the Music Academy, choosing two areas that were to occupy him the whole of his life: pianism and composing. He took his piano degree on June 27, 1925, class of Svetislav Stančić, and obtained his diploma for composition and instrumentation on June 25, 1927 under Blagoje Bersa.

At the degree concert on June 23 the same year, Božidar figured as composer and as pianist, performing his own piano compositions, and also accompanying sister Zinka and violinist Ljerko Spiller. Immediately after his degree he started his rich concert and composing career. As early as June 29, 1927, the Zagreb Philharmonic Orchestra performed a concert dedicated to his works (Idyll, the cantata On the Nile, Sonata for Cello and Piano), while the next year for his Violin concerto he won the highly prestigious Zlatko Baloković Prize.

From 1929 on Kunc worked as a teacher as well, tutoring piano at the Music Academy and coaching young singers. For ten years (1941–1951) he also managed the Opera Studio.

In the 1930s Kunc rang up new international successes at European festivals: at the international festival in Dresden in 1934 the Staatskapelle performed his Piano Concerto in B Minor, with the composer himself as soloist (on March 7, 1954, the Philadelphia Orchestra conducted by Eugène Ormandy performed the same work). After that came well reviewed performances in Karlovy Váry, Frankfurt/M and Prague. World War II halted any further development of his reputation. In these years, Kunc still composed, and after the war appeared throughout Croatia and in the Yugoslavia of the time, as soloist and accompanist for singers, often in improvised conditions.

A crucial turning-point in Kunc's life was in 1951 when he decided to follow his sister Zinka (now Milanov) to the United States. An affectionate closeness with his sister, now a celebrated prima donna, as well as hope for an international career of his own (combined with an awareness of his peripheral position in the communist Yugoslav regime) all affected Kunc's decision. He soon got involved in Zinka's concert tours, and coached her for all the time she was under contract to the Metropolitan. In the framework of Zinka's concerts, Kunc also played as a soloist, most often performing his own compositions. Still, his appearances stayed in the shadow of his sister's art, and he did not manage to make that breakthrough into the world composing scene as he had hoped.

When he went to the United States, the external circumstances of Kunc's life changed essentially. His new and essentially insecure musical status forced him, like so many before him (including Béla Bartók), into a struggle for mere existence. He worked in a broad field and this caused him lasting stress.

Year after year, Kunc undertook many tours with Zinka around the United States and Europe, he played at benefits and in recordings, coached singers and accompanied them at their appearances, played music in a four-handed ensemble, and performed celesta and triangle parts in the orchestra of the Metropolitan Opera. An invaluable source of revenue lay in his coaching in the ballet school of Mia Čorak Slavenska (although he considered this work to be beneath him as a pianist).

He kept up contacts with some of his friends from Zagreb, and they were joined by others in America. In addition to his versatile and vigorous artistic engagements, the last years of his life were burdened with personal circuities and crises. After his marriage with Karla, née Račić (later married name Cizelj), who to her death kept his Zagreb artistic legacy (today in the Croatian Music Institute) and his second marriage to American nurse Ruth Higgins, from which union came his son Douglas, in 1959 Kunc met DeElda Fiebelkorn (born 1923), and in his marriage with her, and with their daughter, Ivana Joy, found happiness and artistic inspiration.

The last performance of Božidar Kunc was in the packed Ford Hall in Detroit, on April 1, 1964. The Detroit Symphony Orchestra was conducted by Sixten Ehrling and performed, with participation from Zinka, works from the international and Croatian repertoire. The focus of this benefit was the performance of Kunc's Piano Concerto in B Minor, with the composer as soloist. Immediately after the concert, Kunc had a heart attack and died. His friends remember him as a vivacious, always kindly and witty man, a brilliant improviser.

== Oeuvre ==
The extensive oeuvre of Božidar Kunc encompasses all the musical kinds apart from opera. At the focus of his interest was the piano, to which he devoted four sonatas and about 90 other compositions (programme cycles, bagatelles, nocturnes, preludes, toccatas, stylised dances, music for and about children). The piano was the hub of his chamber works, which in part belong among classical-romantic compositions (violin sonata, sonata for cello and piano, piano quartet and piano quintet), and are partly shorter compositions. Sometimes the composer gives it the leading role in works that have distinctive subject matters, such as Two Chapters from the Book of Job, Two Dance Improvisations, Three Episodes for Piano and String Orchestra, Ballet Scene for Two Pianos and the cycle For Piano and Percussion. Kunc's favourite instrument delivered a powerful musical energy in the brilliantly orchestrated virtuoso First Concerto for Piano and Orchestra (the second concerto was not completed).

The private world of Božidar Kunc is revealed to us particularly in his solo songs. There are some forty of them to English and Croatian lyrics, and they are partially collected into cycles. Their inventive melodies derive from the composer's familiarity with voice, and the aesthetic piano part interacts and mingles with the vocal part. We might recall just the youthful anthology-piece songs Zima (Winter; Antun Branko Šimić) and Smrt karnevala (Death of Carnival, Miroslav Krleža) and the later work De Elda's Love Songs to words by his wife.

Kunc's youthful orchestral works (Idyll and others), as well as the cantata On the Nile are unjustly forgotten.

Božidar Kunc was quite aware of his worth as a composer. He thought of himself as a "link in the chain of the greats" and – wanting to round off his oeuvre in America – worked with great intensity on composition, sometimes only at night. His composerly poetics, which in his homeland was quite distinct from the prevailing trend, on his change of setting and on meeting the international repertoire, acquired certain new characteristics, which invoked restraint along with the widespread labelling of his musical expression as "Impressionist" or "post-Impressionist".

Such considerations are encouraged in particular by Kunc's harmony, which during his creative lifetime developed according to an expanded tonality in line with the general development of harmonic thinking. It is at the base of the refined and ever-new structure of his works, in which a luxuriant colouring alternates with harsh dissonant consonances of a remarkably expressive impression. In his piano style, Kunc pushes back the previous borders of sonority with a specific registration, imaginative use of the pedal and a new, but typically Kuncian, ornamentation. At the same time he is fond of a markedly melodic line and an easily readable formal disposition, which gives his compositions both equilibrium and classicist clarity.

The characteristic constants of Kunc's musical expression are its danceability, picturesqueness (programme music) and its occasional discreet stylisation of folk music.

== Works (selection) ==
- Idyll for orchestra, op. 1
- Ver Sacrum, piano cycle, op. 2
- Free Variations on a Personal Theme for piano, op. 3
- Three Pieces for violin and piano, op. 4
- Sonata for cello and piano in D major, op. 5
- On the Nile for soprano and orchestra, op. 7
- Concerto for violin and orchestra in g minor, op. 8
- Sonata in D flat major for piano, op. 12
- Ceremonial Ouverture for orchestra, op. 13
- Early leaves. Seven piano pieces, op. 20
- Concerto for piano and orchestra u h-molu, op. 22
- Ouverture for the Sad Game for orchestra, op. 25
- Sonata in E flat major for piano, op. 27
- Three Pieces for violin and piano, op. 28
- Two Nocturnes for piano, op. 32
- Aspiration for violin and piano, op. 33
- Sonata in D major for piano, op. 34
- Quintet in c minor for two violins, viola, cello and piano, op. 35
- Capriccio in A major for piano, op. 38
- Easter Morning in a Slavonian Village for two pianos
- Five Waltzes for piano, op. 39
- Triptychon for cello and orchestra, op. 40
- Sonatina for violin and piano in G major, op. 41
- Romance in f minor for piano, op. 42
- Sonata in A flat major for piano, op. 43
- Six Bagatelles for piano, op. 44
- Rondo for violin and piano, op. 48
- Four Preludes for piano, op. 24
- Reflections from Childhood for piano, op. 50
- Ballet Scene for two pianos, op. 54
- Second concerto for violin and orchestra u d-molu, op. 55
- In Retrospect. Six piano pieces, op. 56
- Three Episodes for piano and string orchestra, op. 58
- Pastoral Fantasy for Clarinet Solo, op. 59
- Soliloquy for Flute Solo, op. 61
- Dance for Oboe Solo, op. 62
- Buffoonery for Bassoon Solo, op. 63
- Little Pieces for Little People for piano
- Gleanings from the Old Country for piano, op. 66
- Impromptu for piano, op. 67
- Job in Desolation, iz Two Chapters from the Book of Job for piano, op. 68
- Piano Miniatures, 1
- Songs, 1–2
