= Srećko Puntarić =

Croatian cartoonist

- Born: 19 May 1952 (age 73); Zagreb, PR Croatia, Yugoslavia
- Occupation: caricaturist

Srećko Puntarić (born 19 May 1952) is a Croatian cartoonist. He is best known for his regular comic "Felix" in the Croatian daily Večernji list, but has had his comic strips published in nearly every Croatian newspaper.

== Biography ==
He was born on 19 May 1952 in Zagreb. In 1978 he graduated at the Faculty of Mechanical Engineering and Naval Architecture in Zagreb.
