= Mathilde von Marlow =

German opera singer

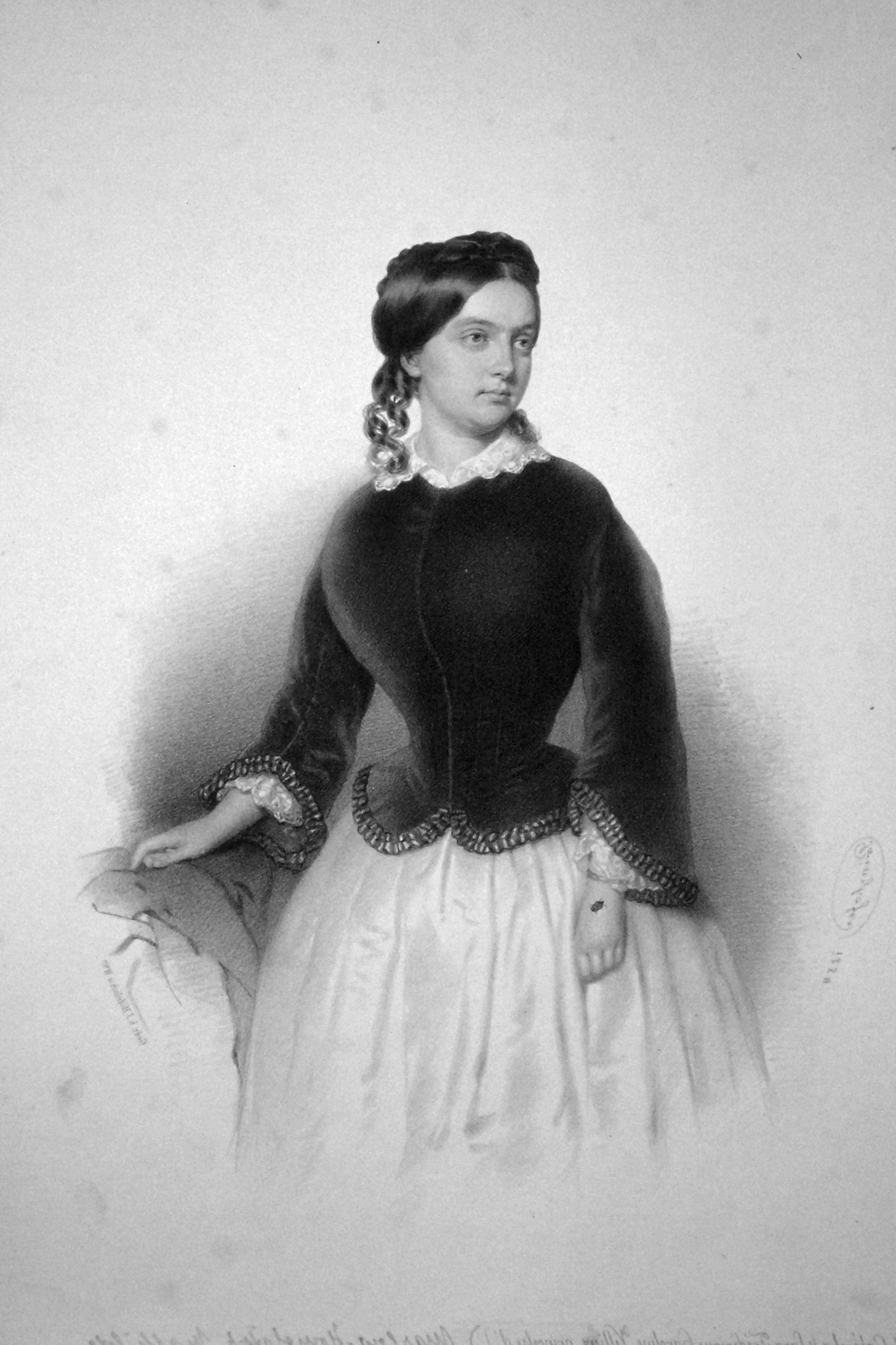
Mathilde von Marlow-Homolatsch August Prinzhofer (lithograph), 1854

Mathilde von Marlow (born Mathilde Wolfram: c.1828 – 22 September 1888) was the stage name used by the Austrian-German opera singer whose actual name, following her marriage, became Mathilde Marlow-Homolatsch. "Mathilde von Marlow" is the name by which she is most frequently identified in sources.

During the early part of her career she sang in a succession of opera houses across the Austro-Hungarian empire, including those in Vienna, Brno, Preßburg and Ödenburg. As she began to be cast in major roles she moved to Darmstadt, where she became a darling with audiences during her five years at the Grand Ducal Court Theatre ("großherzogliche Hoftheater"). At the end of five years she moved on to the Hofbühne (theatre) in Stuttgart where she was forced by a foot ailment to take a year away from the stage. Sources relate that her return was greeted with great enthusiasm.

== Life ==
Mathilde von Wolfram was born at Agram, probably during or before 1828. J von Wolfram, her father, was an imperial military official. The family relocated to Vienna when Mathilde was barely two years old. Her father died very soon after the move, leaving his daughter to be bought up by her mother on her own. Her talent became apparent very early on. She was only ten when her mother began sending her to the Vienna Conservatory. Soon after that her training was taken on by Giovanni Gentiluomo, a well-regarded and, as matters turned out, well-chosen young singing teacher (and opera singer). She was still only fifteen when she was able to begin experimenting with small roles at the Vienna Court Opera, precursor to the current Vienna State Opera, which occupies the same site. That was followed by further minor roles at Brünn (Brno), Preßburg (since 1919 Bratislava) and Ödenburg (since 1919 Sopron).

Her mother reacted to her success by deciding that she was ready for further training, this time in Italy. Mother and daughter moved to Florence where for a year Mathilde received further instruction in her chosen profession. There was no shortage of tempting offers in the Grand Duchy, but after a year the women were missing home, so returned to Vienna, where she was immediately taken under contract with Alois Pokorny (1825–1883) of the Theater an der Wien.

She moved on in 1848 to the Grand Ducal Court Theatre ("großherzogliche Hoftheater") in Darmstadt, where she remained for five years, quickly becoming a firm favourite with opera audiences. It was during her time in Darmstadt that she married Anton von Homolatsch who came, originally, from Brünn. He is described in sources as "a wealthy aristocrat". She had already gotten to know her new husband when they were both living in Vienna. Little more is known of Homolatsch, beyond the plausible assertion than he had been captivated by his wife's artistry and grace.

From Darmstadt she moved on to Hamburg where she worked for a season at what was known at that time as the "Stadttheater". There are, indeed, indications that she may already have worked at Hamburg before her five years at Darmstadt. In any event, by 1853 her well-trained voice had matured and she had acquired a reputation with theatre managers as an outstanding Coloratura soprano. Mathilde von Marlow was much in demand. During 1854 she was faced with two competing offers. The one from the Vienna Court Opera was financially attractive, and would involve a return to the city in which she had grown up and the opera company with which, as a teenager, she had made her first stage appearances. On the other hand, the Vienna offer came with a large contractual penalty, whereby she would be required to repay 6,000 florins in the event of a premature termination of her contract. The offer from the Hofbühne (Court Theatre) in Stuttgart was financially even more attractive. The theatre director proposed a life-time commitment to her employment, including a substantial retirement pension entitlement. However, then theatre management needed to obtain royal approval before finalising these terms. Pressed for a decision, while the Stuttgart offer still awaited royal endorsement, von Marlow telegraphed her acceptance of the Vienna offer.

Shortly after she had accepted the Vienna offer, royal approval for the yet more generous Stuttgart contact came through. Von Marlow's resulting dilemma was resolved only through the mediation of Württemberg's ancient king (who had family connections with the emperor. It was agreed that von Marlow might move to Vienna for a period, but this was to be on the strict understanding that her appearances on the Vienna Court Opera stage would be treated as guest appearances, and the period should be relatively brief. After that she returned to the Stuttgart Court Theatre, becoming a lifelong member of the theatre company, greatly revered by audiences due to the excellence of her performances.

Among her best-loved roles during her time at Stuttgart were "the Queen of the Night" in Magic Flute, "the Queen of Navarre" in Les Huguenots and "Princess Isabella" in Robert le diable. She stepped back from the stage in 1882.

Mathilde von Marlow died at Stuttgart on 22 September 1888. She had arrived for a performance of Rheingold, but before reaching the auditorium she collapsed in the corridor as the result of a stroke. She died a few minutes later.

== The pseudonym ==
The name "Marlow", which Mathilde used for her stage name, was a near-anagram of the family name "Wolfram", with which she had been born. Only the "f" was left out.
