= Stjepan Betlheim =

Croatian psychiatrist and psychoanalyst (1898–1970)

- Born: 22 July 1898; Zagreb, Austria-Hungary, (now Croatia)
- Died: 24 September 1970 (aged 72); Zagreb, SFR Yugoslavia
- Occupations: Psychiatrist; psychoanalyst
- Spouse: Marie Luise Betlheim
- Children: Ruth Betlheim

Stjepan Betlheim (22 July 1898 – 24 September 1970) was a Croatian psychiatrist and psychoanalyst.

== Early life and education ==
Betlheim was born in Zagreb to a Jewish family. He studied medicine in Graz and Vienna, where he showed interest in psychoanalysis and attended lectures of Sigmund Freud. He graduated in 1922. Betlheim specialised in neuropsychiatry in Vienna, Berlin, Zürich, and Paris. During his specialisation, he published six articles in distinguished Austrian and German neurological or neuropsychiatric journals.

== Career and later life ==
He worked at the Vienna neuropsychiatric clinic headed by Julius Wagner-Jauregg. After the first analysis with Paul Schilder, Betlheim completed his training with Sandor Rado. Betlheim's first analyses were supervised by Karen Horney and Helene Deutsch. He returned to Zagreb in 1928. During World War II, in 1941, the Independent State of Croatia authorities sent Betlheim, Stjepan Steiner and 80 other Jewish physicians to Bosnia to treat endemic syphilis. He later escaped and joined the Yugoslav Partisans. After the war, in 1948, he became an assistant at the Neurologic-psychiatric Clinic of the School of Medicine, University of Zagreb, where he introduced the psychoanalytical dimension into the understanding of mental illness. He became a member of the International Psychoanalytical Association in 1952. Betlheim further developed the group therapy for sexual disorders. In 1953 Betlheim founded the ambulatory psychotherapeutic ward, the first in Croatia, at the neurologic-psychiatric Clinic of the School of Medicine, University of Zagreb and neuropsychiatric clinic at the University Hospital Centre Zagreb. Parallel to his therapeutic work, Betlheim was also a prolific scientist and teacher.

== Personal life and death ==
Betlheim was married to Marie Luise (née Morgenroth) with whom he had a daughter named Ruth. Until his death Betlheim treated patients, taught and did scientific research. He was buried at the Mirogoj Cemetery.

== Honors ==
In 1998 Croatian Post issued a stamp to honor him. A bust of Prof. Dr. Stjepan Betlheim is placed in front of the University Hospital Centre Zagreb. His daughter wrote a book about the life of her father, which was issued and presented in 2006 at the Jewish community in Zagreb.

== Works ==
- Psihijatrija, 1959
- Neuroze i njihovo lečenje, 1963
- O govornim omaškama u Korsakovljevoj psihozi, 1989
- Snovi u psihoterapiji, 1993
- Radovi, pisma, dokumenti : 1898–1970, 2006

== Bibliography ==
- Snješka Knežević, Aleksander Laslo (2011). Židovski Zagreb. Zagreb: AGM, Židovska općina Zagreb. ISBN 978-953-174-393-8.
- Kraus, Ognjen (1998). Dva stoljeća povijesti i kulture Židova u Zagrebu i Hrvatskoj. Zagreb: Židovska općina Zagreb. ISBN 953-96836-2-9.
