= Josip Franjo Domin =

Croatian-Hungarian physicist, priest and medical doctor

Josip Franjo Domin (German: Joseph Franz Domin, Hungarian: József Ferenc Domin; 28 January 1754 – 19 January 1819) was a Croatian-Hungarian physicist, priest, medical doctor and a pioneer of electrotherapy.

== Biography ==
Domin was born in Zagreb, where he also died after spending much of his life in Vienna, Graz, Budapest, Győr, Pécs and Trnava.

He was educated in Zagreb, Vienna, Leoben and Graz. In 1774 he graduated philosophy at the Royal Academy of Sciences and theology in 1776 in Zagreb. In 1777 in Trnava he received a doctorate in mathematics and became a full professor of theoretical and experimental physics, mechanics and economics at the Royal Academy of Sciences in Győr (1777–1785) and Pécs (1785–1792).

At the Faculty of Arts in Budapest since 1792 he was a physics professor having succeeded Ionnes B. Horváth to the chair. He was dean of the faculty (1794–1796) and Rector of the university in Budapest (1798). Since 1800 he was a canon of Zagreb and since 1801 rector of Episcopal Seminary in Zagreb. Since 1799 he was a member of the Arcadian Academy in Naples and Honorary Doctor of the college and since 1802 a member of the Etruscan Academy in Cortona.

== Research and work ==
Domin dealt with the chemistry of gases and published a textbook, the first of its kind in Hungary of that time. He performed experiments with balloons, investigated the nature and propagation of sound and refuted an established opinion of that time about the use of sound for elimination of electricity (lightning). He investigated static electricity and its use in medicine, cured various diseases using electricity and has written four discussions on electrotherapy. Domin also perfected the electric igniter on hydrogen and described the principle of its operation and application.

== Sources ==
- Snježana Paušek-Baždar (1988). "A Contribution to the Biography of Josip Franjo Domin (1754-1819) based on the Study of his Correspondence and Documents in the Archives in Hungary". Zbornik Odsjeka za Povijesne Znanosti Zavoda za Povijesne i Društvene Znanosti Hrvatske Akademije Znanosti i Umjetnosti. 15. Croatian Academy of Arts and Sciences: 91–113.
- "Domin, Franjo Josip", Croatian Encyclopedia (in Croatian), Leksikografski zavod Miroslav Krleža, 1999–2009
