= Tomislav Krizman =

Croatian painter, graphic artist, costume and set designer, teacher and author

- Born: 21 July 1882; Orlovac (now part of Karlovac), Austria-Hungary (today's Croatia)
- Died: 24 October 1955 (aged 73); Zagreb, SFR Yugoslavia (today's Croatia)
- Known for: Oil painting, graphic art
- Movement: secessionism, expressionism, Cubism
- Relatives: Hinko Krizman (brother)

Tomislav Krizman (1882–1955), was a Croatian painter, graphic artist, costume and set designer, teacher, author and organizer of cultural events. He painted in oils and tempera, although he is principally remembered for his remarkable graphic art.

He was of the founders of the Medulić Society, and the Zagreb Spring Salon of 1916. He exhibited in Zagreb, Belgrade, Ljubljana, Vienna, Paris and Rome.

== Biography ==
Tomislav Krizman was born on 21 July 1882 in Orlovac (now part of Karlovac). He attended the Commerce Academy (Trgovačka akademija), while also studying painting and drawing with Bela Čikoš Sesija, Robert Auer and Menci Clement Crnčić. From 1903 to 1907 he went to Vienna, where he attended the School of Crafts and Academy of Fine Arts studying with William Unger.

Krizman remained in Vienna for ten years, an important time in his artistic development, spending time with other artists of the avant-garde secession. He incorporated their ideas into his own art, and participated in the group exhibitions Hagenbund, Jungbund, Künstlerhaus and Secesija ("Secession").

He exhibited his artworks as a part of Kingdom of Serbia's pavilion at International Exhibition of Art of 1911.

From 1912, Krizman worked in Zagreb, first as a teacher at the Arts and Crafts School (Škola primijenjene umjetnosti i dizajna), then from 1922 in the Graphics Department of the Academy of Fine Arts in Zagreb.

He died on 24 October 1955 in Zagreb.

== Legacy ==
Krizman is remembered for his graphic work. He loved to travel, and draw what he saw: views of Vienna, Hrvatsko Zagorje, Bosnia, and Dalmatia. His views of Bosnia, Hercegovina, Kosovo and Macedonia are very evocative and fresh. He created some memorable portraits, including Mary Delvarda, Portret djevojčice ("Portrait of a Girl"), Autoportret ("Self-portrait"), Meštrović and Brat Hinko ("Brother Hinko").

His knowledge of graphic techniques was published in a book "On Graphical Arts" (O grafičkim vještinama), (1952).

He wrote books and magazine articles and worked as a costume and set designer for opera and drama.

The appearance of posters corresponds with the emergence of the secession or Art Nouveau movements that arrived in Zagreb in 1898. The poster was a popular image form of the new era, and Tomislav Krizman created memorable poster art for various events of culture, sports, entertainment, and politics. One of his first posters was of the cabaret singer Marya Delvard, who had delighted audience in Vienna and Munich before arriving in Zagreb in 1907. Krizman's image perfectly captured the essential femme-fatale type of Art Nouveau woman.

== Works ==
- Portrait of Marya Delvard
- Portrait of a Girl (Portret djevojčice)
- Self-portrait (Autoportret)
- Portrait of Ivan Meštrović
- Brother Hinko (Brat Hinko)
- A Street in Ohrid (Ulica u Ohridu), 1930
- Travel drawings and etchings

== Exhibitions ==
=== Solo shows ===
Recent solo exhibitions include

- 1995 Tomislav Krizman retrospektivna izložba – Art Pavilion, Zagreb

=== Group shows ===
During his lifetime, Krizman exhibited with the Medulić Society, and the Spring Salon. He exhibited in Zagreb, Belgrade, Ljubljana, Vienna, Paris and Rome.

=== Public collections ===
Tomislav Krizman's work can be found in the following public collections

- Museum of Contemporary Art, Zagreb (Muzej Suvremene Umjetnosti)
- National and University Library in Zagreb
- Croatian History Museum, Zagreb
- National Museum (Narodni Muzej), Zadar
