= Art Pavilion, Zagreb =

The Art Pavilion in Zagreb
- Umjetnički paviljon u Zagrebu
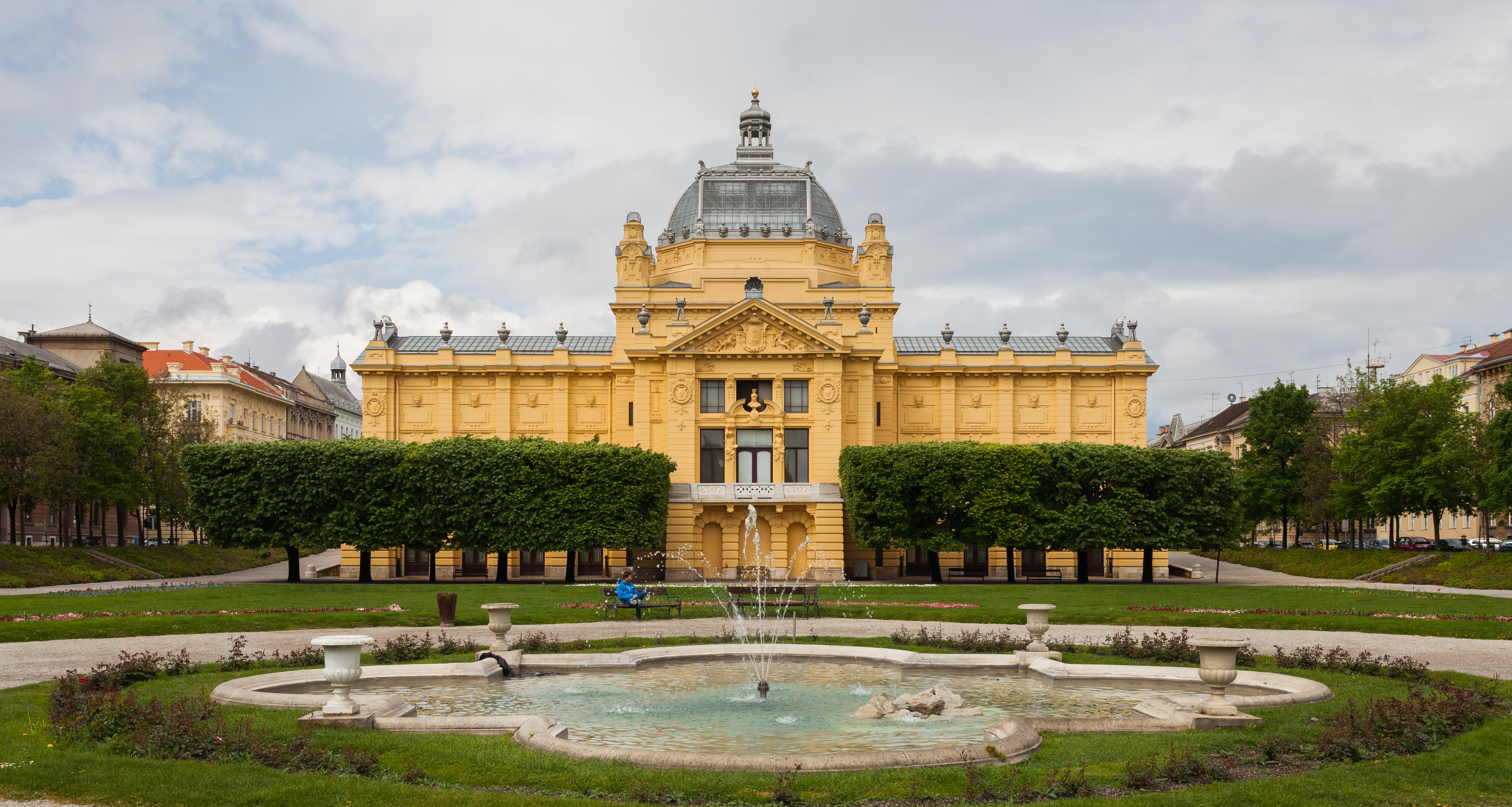
- Front entrance to the Pavilion, as seen from King Tomislav Square
- Established: 15 December 1898; 127 years ago
- Location: 22 King Tomislav Square, Zagreb
- Coordinates: 45°48′26″N 15°58′43″E
- Type: Art gallery
- Visitors: 65,164 (2018)
- Director: Irena Bekić
- Public transit access: Tram Lines: 2, 4, 6, 9, 13.
- Website: umjetnicki-paviljon.hr

Cultural Good of Croatia
- Type: Protected cultural good
- Reference no.: Z-222

The Art pavilion in Zagreb (Croatian: Umjetnički paviljon u Zagrebu) is an art gallery in Zagreb, Croatia. The pavilion is located on the Lenuci Horseshoe, Lower town area of the city, south of Nikola Šubić Zrinski Square, on the northern side of the King Tomislav Square which flanks the Zagreb Central Station. Established in 1898, it is the oldest gallery in Southeast Europe and the only purpose-built gallery in Zagreb designed specifically to accommodate large scale exhibitions.

== History ==
The idea of creating the gallery was first put forward by Croatian painter Vlaho Bukovac in the spring of 1895. In May 1896 a Millennium Exhibition was to be held in Budapest, celebrating 1,000 years of Hungarian statehood, and artists from what was then Kingdom of Croatia-Slavonia were invited to attend. Urged by Bukovac, Croatian artists decided to present their works in a purpose-built Pavilion, constructed around a prefabricated iron skeleton so that it could easily be shipped to Zagreb after the exhibition. The Budapest Pavilion was designed by Hungarian architects Flóris Korb and Kálmán Giergl and was constructed by the Danubius building company.

After the exhibition had ended, the building's skeleton was transported to Zagreb and Austrian architects Fellner & Helmer (who were at the time active in Zagreb, and had earlier designed the Croatian National Theatre building) were hired to design a new version of the building based on the iron skeleton, while the Hönigsberg & Deutsch building company was contracted to perform the actual construction. The building's exterior was decorated with sculptures in the academic art style — the eastern facade displays busts of three Italian Renaissance painters — Giulio Clovio (Julije Klović), Andrea Schiavone (Andrija Medulić) and Vittore Carpaccio, and the western facade has busts of Michelangelo, Raphael and Titian.

The construction went on for two years between 1897 and 1898 and the Pavilion was officially inaugurated on 15 December 1898 with a large exhibition showcasing works of local artists called Croatian Salon (Croatian: Hrvatski salon). The exhibition was very popular and attracted some 10,000 visitors, at a time when Zagreb had a total population of 60,000.

The gallery has a total display area of 600 m^{2} and does not have a permanent display as it specialises in one-off solo and group exhibitions representing notable oeuvres and art movements from all periods and styles, with works by both Croatian and foreign artists. Throughout its history the gallery organised around 700 exhibitions with artists ranging from the Earth Group collective to George Grosz, Henry Moore, Auguste Rodin, Andy Warhol, Mimmo Rotella, Joan Miró, Auguste Rodin, Alberto Giacometti and many others.

=== Recent Years ===
In recent years it featured retrospective exhibitions of artists such as Milivoj Uzelac, Gilles Aillaud, Edo Kovačević, Gerhard Richter, Vilko Gecan, Dušan Džamonja, Vlaho Bukovac, Boris Demur, Anto Jerković, Marijan Trepše, Bela Csikos Sesia, Nasta Rojc and group exhibitions which featured works of contemporary artists such as Santiago Sierra and Boris Mikhailov, as well as 19th-century artists such as Karl von Piloty, Nikolaos Gyzis, Gabriel von Max and Franz Stuck.

In 2006, the glass roof of the Pavilion was renovated and the lighting system was replaced. The renovation works continued for seven years and were completed in 2013.

In 2020, the Pavilion was damaged by a strong earthquake, and went to intense reconstruction since. As of 2026, it remains closed to visitors.

=== Gallery ===
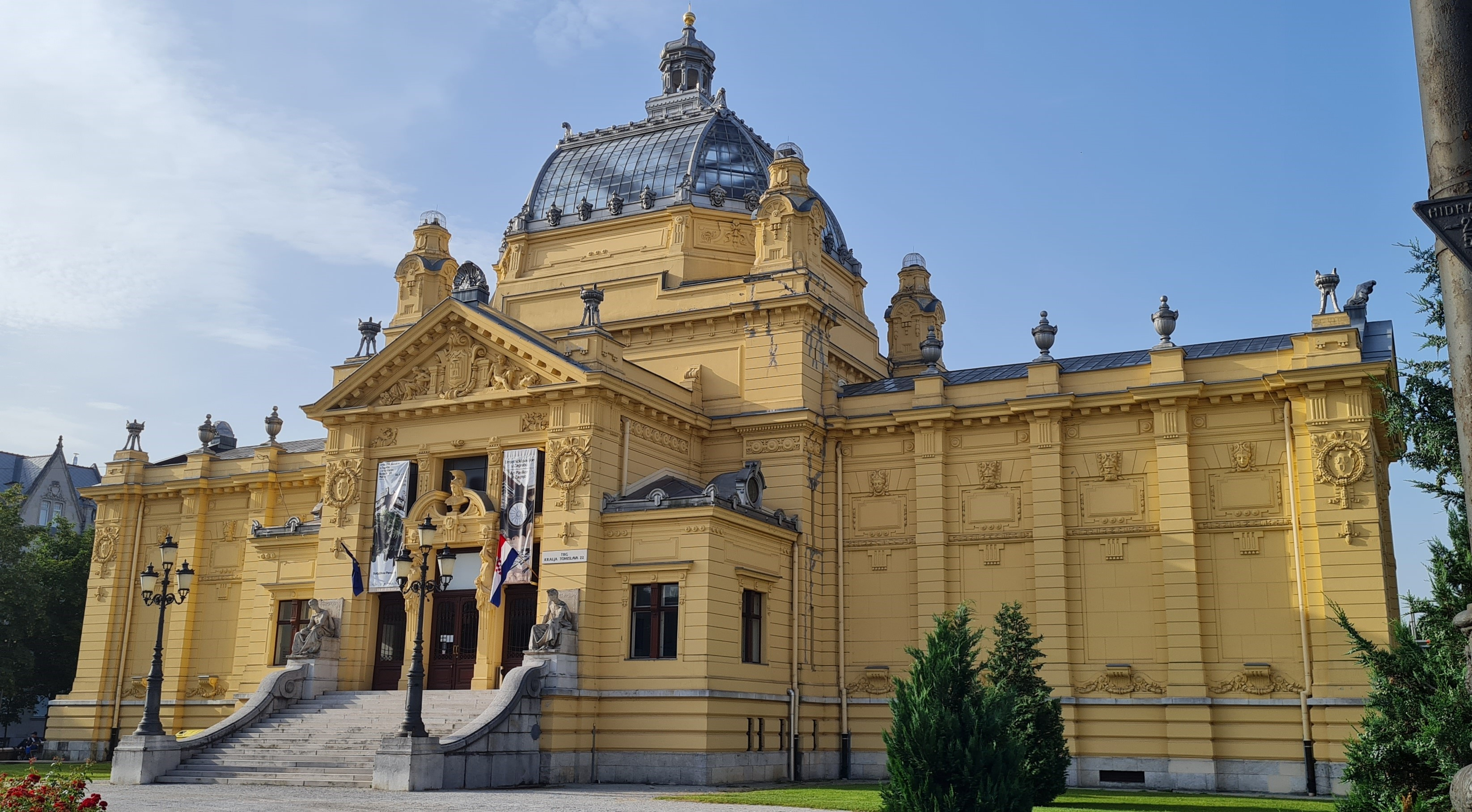
Art Pavilion

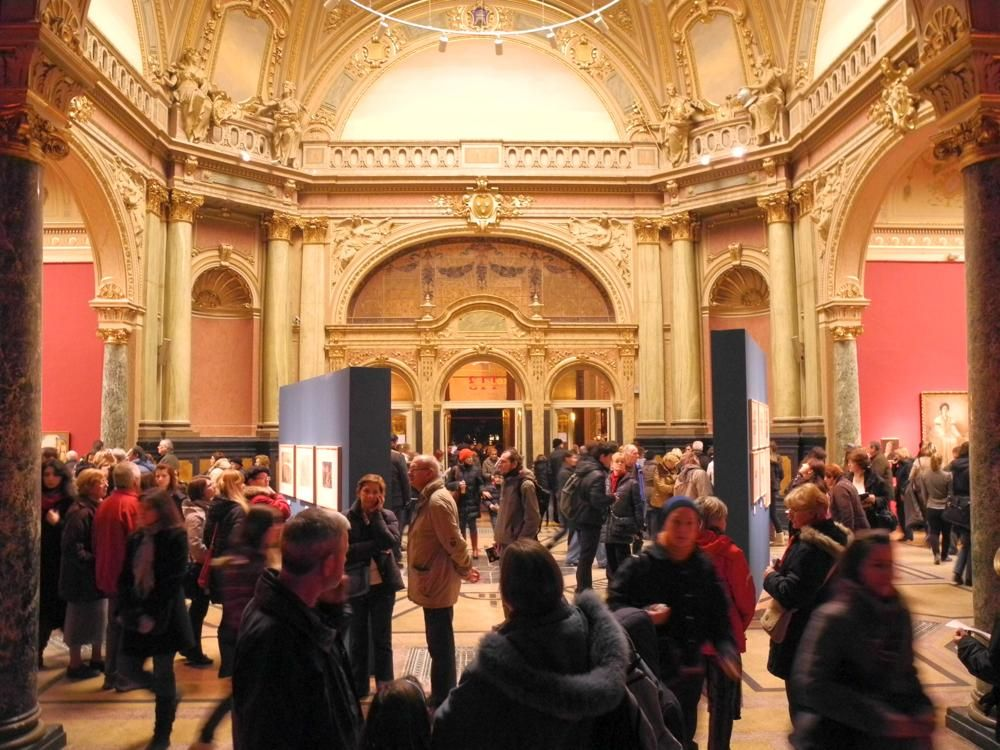
Main Hall

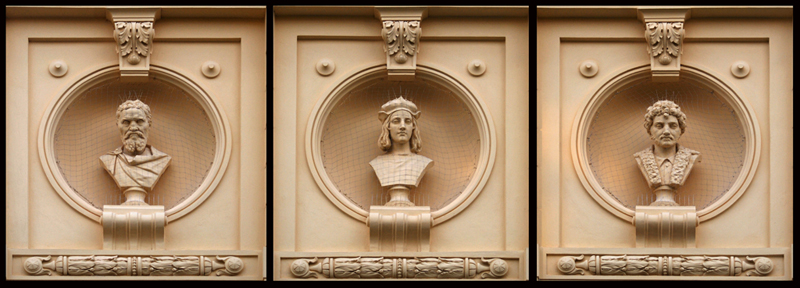
Busts of Michelangelo, Raphael and Titian. Western side of Art Pavilion Zagreb.
