= Đuro Arnold =

Croatian philosopher

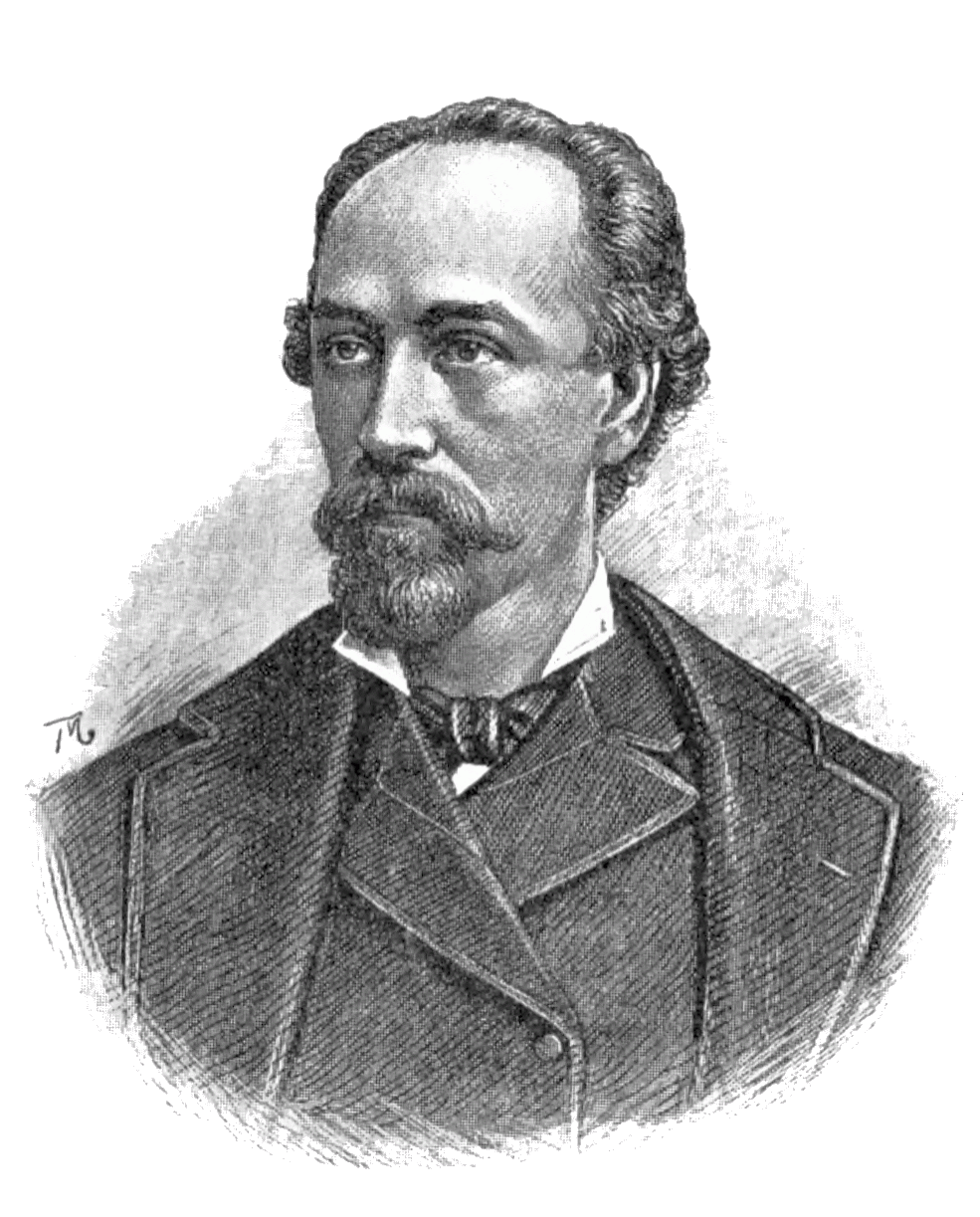
Đuro Arnold

Đuro Arnold (24 March 1853 – 22 February 1941) was a Croatian writer and philosopher.

== Early life and study ==
Arnold was born as the 19th of 24 children of Ivan, a tax gatherer, and Sofija, née Vukanić. His ancestors arrived from Switzerland during the French Revolution. He was born in Ivanec and spent his early childhood in Krapina. He attended primary school in Zagreb, and high school in Varaždin and Zagreb, where he graduated in 1873.

In 1874 he enrolled at the Faculty of Philosophy in Zagreb majoring in philosophy, with a minor in history and geography. During the Bosnian crisis he was recruited, and it was only in 1879 that he was hired as a professor in a Zagreb gymnasium. In 1880 he was promoted as the first PhD in philosophy at the University of Zagreb, with a thesis Ethics and history (Etika i povijest), which was published in 1879. He continued his studies at the universities of Göttingen (1880), Berlin and Paris (1881/1882).

== Work ==
Since 1889 he served as the Director of the Royal Teacher's School. In 1894 he was appointed as a professor extraordinarius, and since 1896 as the full professor of theoretical and practical philosophy and pedagogy at the Faculty of Philosophy in Zagreb. He retired in 1923. He was the dean of the Faculty of Arts in the periods of 1898–1899, and 1912–1913, and also the rector of the University of Zagreb in the period 1899–1900.

He was appointed as a corresponding member of the Croatian Academy of Sciences and Arts in 1891, and as a full member in 1899. He served as the president of Matica hrvatska in 1902–1909. In 1892 he became an honorary member of the Croatian Pedagogic-Literary Society, in 1924 a member of the Society of the Brothers of the Croatian Dragon, and an honorary citizen of Krapina.

== Writer ==
As a writer, his work is a continuation of Croatia's romantic poetry in the tradition of August Šenoa and Franjo Marković. His first appearance as a writer was the song Pri povratku ("On the way back", Vienac, 1873, 49). He mostly published patriotic songs, romances and ballads with themes from Croatian history and folklore (Krapinske elegije, Damjan Juda, knez dubrovački, Kata Lovićeva etc.), as well as reflexive lyricism in publications such as Vienac (1873–1886, 1888–1891, 1893–1902 ), Hrvatska lipa (1875), Hrvatski dom (1876), Obzor (1898, 1900, 1901, 1904), Prosvjeta (1904–1913), Hrvatsko kolo (1905, 1906, 1908, 1930), Katolički list (1906, 1915, 1916), Hrvatska smotra (1907–1910, 1933), Hrvatsko pravo (1908, 1924), Koledar hrvatskoga katoličkoga narodnoga đaštva (1909, 1910), Serafinski perivoj (1909–1913), Književni prilog (1911, 1912, 1913–1915), Hrvatska (1912, 1914, 1915), Hrvatska prosvjeta (1914–1918), Naša misao (1914, 1915 ), Jeka od Osijeka (1918, 1919), Vijenac (1923, 1925, 1927), Hrvatsko pravo (1924, 1925), Omladina (1924, 1925), Hranilovićeva spomenica (1925), Selo i grad (1928/1929, 1930, 1931), Hrvatski list (1939), Novo doba (1940) and others. He wrote a single short story Samo četvrt sata (Vienac, 1880, 15–18).

He signed his works in codes and pseudonyms: A., G. A., Gj. A., Gj. A-d, Gj. Ar., O. D., R. R., Ivančanin, Georg Arnold. He published several books of poems, and the poem Domovina has gained him popularity. His works were published in many anthologies, calendars and almanacs. The selection of his poetry was translated to Czech, Esperanto, German, Slovak and Italian. He expressed his views on literature in talks at the Matica hrvatska conferences: Umjetnost prema znanosti, Može li umjetnost zamijeniti vjeru, Jedinstvena hrvatska narodna kultura (Glas Matice hrvatske, 1906, 1908, 1909).

== Philosopher ==
As a philosopher, he was influenced by Leibniz, Johann Friedrich Herbart and Hermann Lotze, representing the "spiritualist positivism" movement and the view that the knowledge of the world can be reached only by the combined efforts of science, art and religion. He wrote on the fundamental questions of philosophy, which he defined as the science of "final causes and purposes of being".

In the treatise Zadnja bića ("Last beings", Rad JAZU, 1888, 93 ) he conceived a world composed from the variety of simple, immutable soullike "last beings" that are connected by the feeling of touch and hierarchically arranged according to different levels of awareness, with absolute consciousness, the God, occupying the peak of the hierarchy. According to Arnold, faith represents the supreme stronghold of a man and the basic principle of harmony of his spiritual functions.

According to some opinions, in his later works such as O psihologiji bez duše and Monizam i kršćanstvo (Rad JAZU, 1909, 176 and 178) Arnold has abandoned his earlier philosophical views. Others such as Pavao Vuk-Pavlović, Stjepan Matičević and Blaženka Despot however maintain that Arnold's philosophical view was uniform and consistent - spiritualist pluralism which doesn't completely exclude spiritualist monism.

Arnold is one of the founders of the Croatian philosophical terminology, having authored two influential high school textbooks (Logika and Psihologija) that were standard textbooks for more than thirty years.

At Arnold's proposal, in 1896 the Pedagogical Seminar for theoretical and practical training of future secondary school teachers was founded at the Faculty of Philosophy in Zagreb. As a teacher, organizer of educational system, the first Professor of Pedagogy at the Faculty of Philosophy and the first head of the Pedagogical Seminar, has influenced many generations of teachers.

Arnold died in Zagreb.

== Works ==
In literature:

- Izabrane pjesme, 1899, Zagreb
- Čeznuća i maštanja i pjesme, 1900–1907, Zagreb
- S visina i dubina, 1918, Zagreb
- Izabrane pjesme, 1923, Zagreb
- Na pragu vječnosti, 1935, Zagreb

In philosophy:

- Etika i poviest, 1879, Zagreb
- Logika za srednja učilišta, 1888^{1}, 1923^{5}, Zagreb
- Psihologija za srednja učilišta, 1893^{1}, 1923^{7}, Zagreb

Cultural offices
Preceded by Ivan Trnski	President of Matica hrvatska 1902 – 1908	Succeeded by Oton Kučera
Academic offices
Preceded by Josip Šilović	Rector of the University of Zagreb; 1899 – 1900	Succeeded by Rudolf Vimer
