= University of Zadar =

University in Zadar, Croatia

- Sveučilište u Zadru
- Type: Public
- Established: 2002; 24 years ago (14 June 1396 as a theological seminary)
- Affiliations: EUA; BUN
- Rector: Dijana Vican
- Faculty: 440 (2022)
- Administrative staff: 204 (2022)
- Students: c. 6,000 (2022)
- Location: Zadar, Croatia; 44.1131°N 15.2251°E
- Website: www.unizd.hr/

The University of Zadar (Croatian: Sveučilište u Zadru, Latin: Universitas Studiorum Iadertina) is a public university located in Zadar, Croatia. The university in its present form was founded in 2002, but can trace its lineage to 1396, thus making it the oldest higher education institution in Croatia, and one of the oldest in Europe.

== History ==
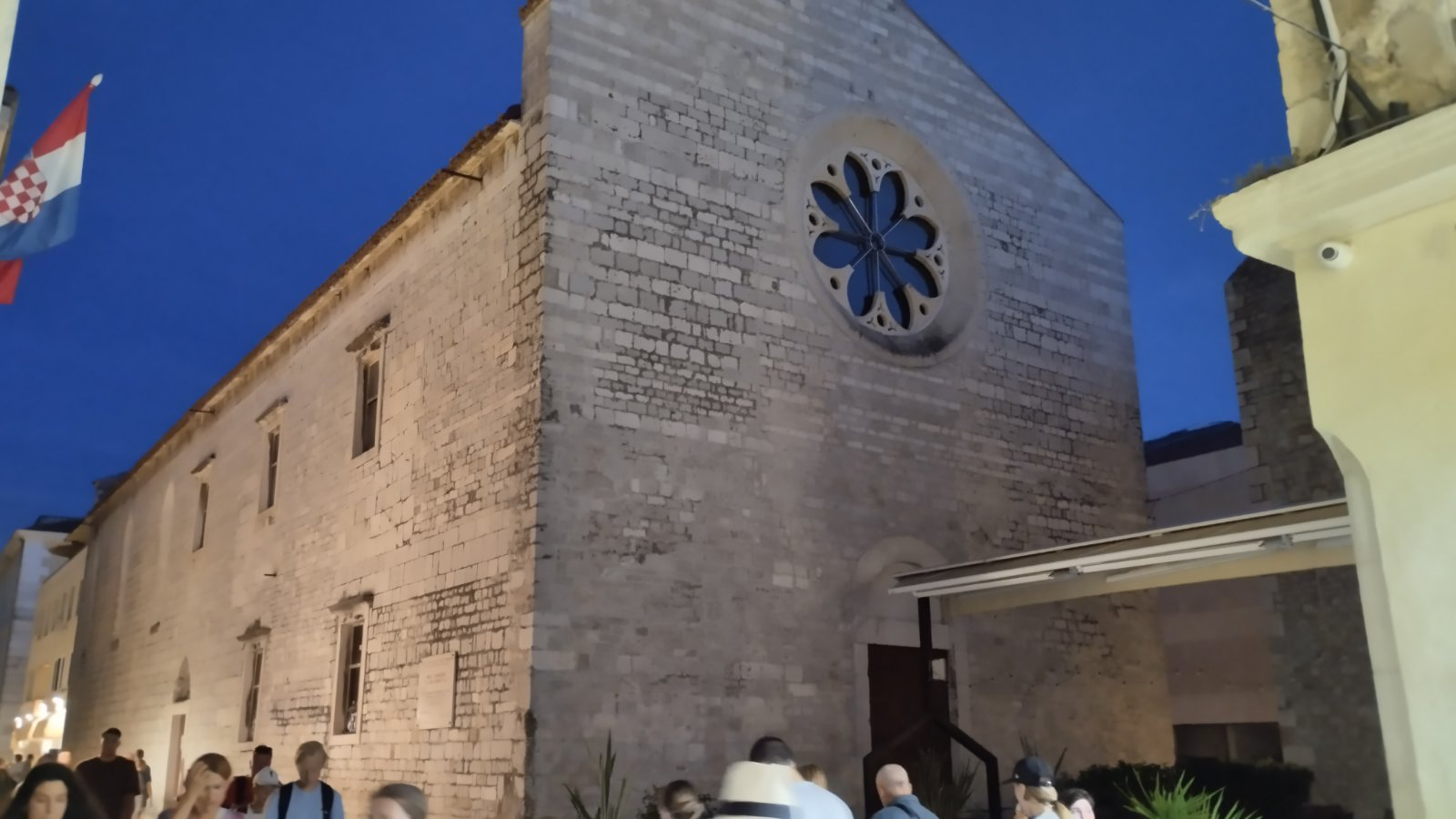
The Church of St. Dominic - a place where original University of Zadar operated back in 1396.

The university was originally founded by the Dominicans in 1396 as Universitas Iadertina, a theological seminary, Iadera being the Latin name for Zadar. It was a continuation of the University of Dyrrachium, in Durrës (Dyrrhachium), Venice, then Republic of Venice, which had been created around 1380, and then transferred to Zadar in 1396, amid the mounting Turkish threats in Southeastern Europe, thereby becoming the University of Zadar.

Consequently, it became the first institute of higher learning in the country. In 1807, it ceased being an independent institution and its functions were taken over by other local universities. In 1956, the University of Zagreb reconstituted it as a satellite campus for the Faculty of Philosophy division. The faculty later became part of the University of Split. Finally, in 2002, more than six centuries after the university's initial founding, the Croatian Parliament passed an act to allow for its full-fledged refounding. Now independent, the renewed University of Zadar opened its doors to students in January 2003.

Since its reestablishment, the university has continued to grow. It had implemented the Bologna Process for the academic year of 2005-2006 as part of nationwide reform. A follow-up study showed that the move was beneficial and had improved its profile internationally. This allowed it to engage in collaborative research agreements and student exchange programmes with other reputable universities around the continent. It also has agreements with universities in South America and the United States.

The first Croatian president, Franjo Tuđman, graduated from the University of Zadar in 1965, then part of the University of Zagreb.

== Faculties ==
Today, the University of Zadar includes 27 university departments:

- Department of Archaeology
- Department of Classical Philology
  - Division of Greek Language and Literature
  - Division of Latin Language and Literature
- Department of Croatian Studies
- Department of Ecology, Agronomy and Aquaculture
- Department of Economics
- Department of English Studies
- Department of Ethnology and Anthropology
- Department of French and Francophone Studies
- Department of Geography
- Department of German Studies
- Department of Health Studies
- Department of Hispanic and Iberian Studies
- Department of History
- Department of History of Art
- Department of Information Sciences
- Department of Italian Studies
- Department of Linguistics
- Department of Pedagogy
- Department of Philosophy
- Department of Psychology
- Department of Religious Sciences
- Department of Russian Studies
- Department of Sociology
- Department of Teacher Education Studies in Gospić
- Department of Teachers and Preschool Teachers Education
  - Division of Elementary School Teacher Education
  - Division of Preschool Teacher Education
- Department of Tourism and Communication Studies
- Maritime department
  - Division of Nautical Studies
  - Division of Maritime Engineering

In order to organise and promote scientific research activities, the university has founded four research centres as its constituent units. These include the Centre for Adriatic Onomastic Research, the Stjepan Matičević Centre, the Centre for Karst and Coastal Research, and the Centre for Interdisciplinary Marine and Maritime Research - CIMMAR.

In addition, there are two active centres for professional and teaching activities: the Centre for Gymnastics and Student Sport, and the Centre for Foreign Languages.

== Rankings ==
University rankings

Regional – Overall
- QS Emerging Europe and Central Asia: 301-350 (2022)

== Acknowledgements ==
- City of Zadar Award (2012)

== See also ==
- List of universities in Croatia
