= Ivan Trnski =

Croatian writer

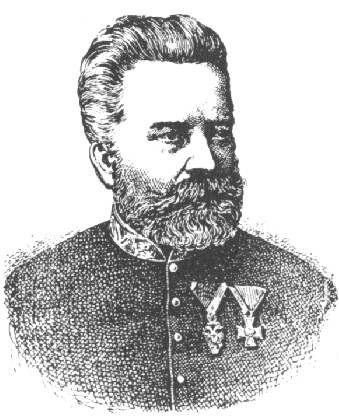
Ivan Trnski

Ivan Trnski (1 May 1819 – 30 June 1910) was a Croatian writer, translator and puzzle designer. Glorified by his contemporaries as a great poet and patriot, he is now considered a skillful poet and a prolific author of occasional verse.

== Life ==
Trnski was born in a family of teachers in the village of Nova Rača near Bjelovar. He completed his primary education in Grubišno Polje in 1830. When his father died, Ivan was sent to the diocesan orphanage in Zagreb, where he went to the Gymnasium. He completed the three-year course for administrative border officer in Graz. After serving for several years on the Military Frontier, he was promoted to lieutenant colonel in 1867 and to colonel in 1869. He was the first prefect of the Bjelovar-Križevci County from July 1871 until February 1872, when he renounced the post. In 1901 Trnski served as the president of Matica hrvatska. He died in Zagreb.

He was the brother-in-law of the Slovene liberal politician Karel Lavrič.

== Works ==
Trnski wrote patriotic, occasional and popular songs (Oh The Long Nights of Autumn), poems (the collections Pjesme krijesnice and Popijevke i milosnice mladenke) and short stories (Slutljivac (The Seer), arguably the first work of supernatural fiction in Croatian).

He translated from English, German, Russian and Czech (Shakespeare, Schiller, and Pushkin's Eugene Onegin).

Trnski also contributed to issues of linguistics and metrics. His essay On Writing Verses (Vijenac, 1874) earned him the popular title of the "Father of Croatian Metrics".

He was glorified by his contemporaries as a great poet and a fighter for the people's rights. The modern literary historians consider him a skilful (but not great) poet and a prolific author of occasional verses. He was the main organizer (1900) and president of the Croatian Writers' Association. He contributed to many magazines, from Gaj's Danica ilirska (1835), Neven and Vijenac, to Savremenik (1910).

Trnski was an important designer of puzzles, such as anagrams and acrostics, for 50 years. Many of his puzzles were written in verse.

As a puzzle designer, he used the pseudonyms Skrivnatin and Skrevnatin. Both are anagrams of his name.

== Bibliography ==
- Milčetić, Ivan (1907). "Šulekova pisma I. Trnskom" [Šulek's Letters to I. Trnski]. Građa za povijest književnosti hrvatske (in Serbo-Croatian). 5: 278–292.

Cultural offices
Preceded by Tadija Smičiklas	President of Matica hrvatska 1901	Succeeded by Đuro Arnold
