= Blaženka Despot =

Blaženka Despot (January 1, 1930 in Zagreb – February 18, 2001 in Zagreb) was a Croatian philosopher, socialist feminist, and sociologist.

== Biography ==
After finishing high school in Zagreb in 1948 and studying philosophy at the Faculty of Philosophy in Zagreb, she received her PhD in Ljubljana in 1970 with a thesis on the humanity of the technological society. During the period 1956–64, she worked as a high school teacher and then as an assistant at the Department of Socialism at the Faculty of Mechanical Engineering. In 1974, she was appointed as an associate professor of sociology and political economy, receiving full professorship in 1980 as a professor of Marxism, socialism and socialist self-management at the Veterinary Faculty in Zagreb. Since 1989, she has been working as a research fellow at the Institute for Social Research at the University of Zagreb.

She published treatises and papers in journals Gledišta (1964–65, 1978, 1984), Praxis (1966–74), Kulturni radnik (1968, 1980, 1987), Naše teme (1968–70, 1982, 1984, 1988–90), Filozofija (1971–72), Revija za sociologiju (1972–73, 1989), Socijalizam (1978–81), Socijalizam u svetu (1978, 1981–82, 1984, 1986), Dometi (1980), Žena (1981–82), Filozofska istraživanja (1985 –86, 1990), Socijalna ekologija (1992) and others.

== Works ==
- Humanitet tehničkog društva, 1971, Zagreb
- Ideologija proizvodnih snaga i proizvodna snaga ideologije, 1976, Osijek
- Plädoyer za dokolicu, 1976, Beograd
- Žensko pitanje i socijalističko samoupravljanje, 1987, Zagreb
- Emancipacija i novi socijalni pokreti, 1989, Osijek
