= Franjo Marković =

Croatian philosopher (1845–1914)

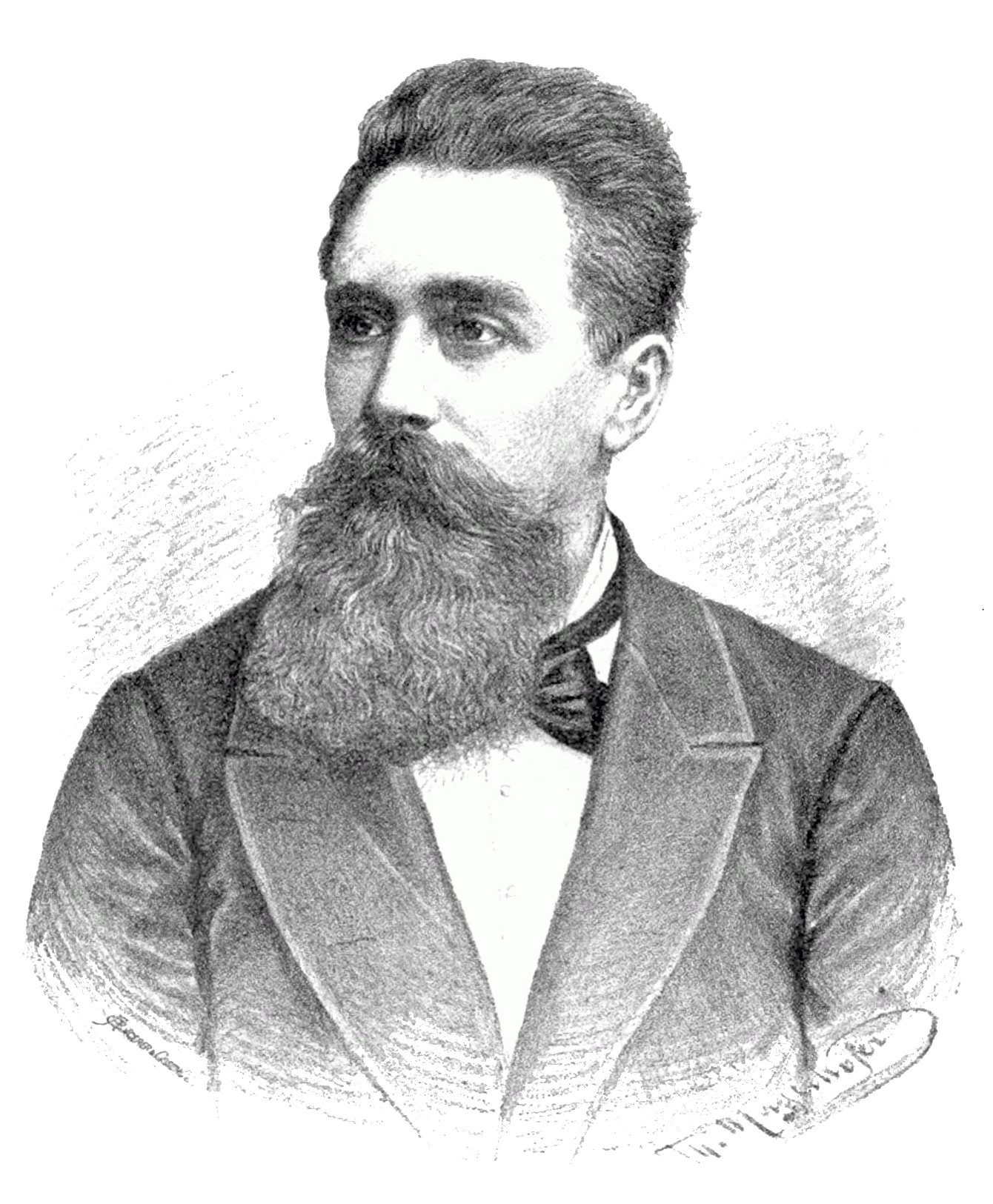
Marković drawn by Mayerhofer, 1884

Franjo Marković (or Franjo pl. Marković; July 26, 1845 in Križevci – September 15, 1914 in Zagreb) was a Croatian philosopher and writer.

He was an academician, the first professor of philosophy at the renovated University of Zagreb in 1874. He defended the identity of philosophy as a metaphysical discipline, as opposed to scholasticism on one side, and positivism and materialism on the other side.

His greatest philosophical work is the Razvoj i sustav obćenite estetike ("The development and the system of general aesthetics"), which heavily influenced the development of Croatian philosophical thought due to its extensive and all-encompassing overview of the history of aesthetics in Croatian, and the introduction of new philosophic terms. He is the founder of the research of Croatian philosophic heritage.

As a writer, he is noted for his lyric-reflexive poetry, epic compositions and dramas. He is a characteristic Romanticist ("national-romantic spirit"), and his poetry was greatly influenced by Adam Mickiewicz.

== Biography ==
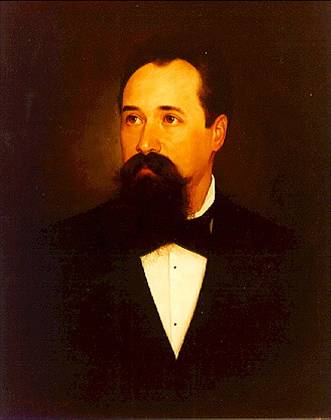
A portrait of Franjo Marković by unknown artist at the council chambers of the University of Zagreb.

Born in a noble family to father Antun and mother Josipa (b. Šugh), he attended the gymnasium at the Nobility Boarding School in Zagreb. In 1862 he left for a study of classical philology and Slavic studies in Vienna. He graduated in 1865, and the next year he passed his gymnasium professorship exam. He worked as an assistant and soon became a full professor at gymnasiums in Osijek and Zagreb. In 1870, after a political protest, he left his service and went to Vienna to study philosophy, and soon to Dresden, Leipzig, Berlin and Paris, receiving his Ph.D. in philosophy in 1872.

In 1874, he was appointed the first head of the independent department for philosophy in Zagreb and the dean of the Faculty of Philosophy. That year the renovated University of Zagreb was founded, and within it, the Faculty of philosophy (then called Mudroslovni fakultet), and in it, the Department for Philosophy (Stolica za mudroslovje teoretično i praktično sa povjestnicom). He served as a rector of the university in the academic year 1881/1882. He continued to teach until his retirement in 1909.

He served as the editor-in-chief of Vijenac in the period 1872–1873. He was also a member of Matica hrvatska from 1875, and a full member of JAZU from 1876.

He served as a representative of the Križevci county in the Parliament of Croatia and Slavonia in the last two decades of the 19th century (at the period of ban Dragutin Károly Khuen-Héderváry). As a member of a mild opposition, he operated by his own principles, insisting on ethical principles in politics. As a "typical representative of Croatian minor nobility" he defended Croatian interests against Hungarian imperialistic pretensions and advocated for constitutional protection, political freedom, and the "spiritual prospect and material development" of the common people.

== Teaching of philosophy ==
Marković held lectures on all philosophic disciplines (logic, psychology, physics, metaphysics, ethics, aesthetics, epistemology, pedagogy and the history of philosophy). In his era, the concept of "philosophy" also encompassed history, geography, linguistics, anthropology, pedagogy, natural sciences and mathematics, which were taught by other professors.

In his pedagogy, he adhered to the system developed by Johann Friedrich Herbart, which at the period (after the revolutionary 1848, which was much contributed to by young Hegelianists, so the authorities were intent to suppress Hegel's and Kant's influence) was generally accepted in Germany and Austria-Hungary. His system had pedagogic qualities for the development of consistence and strictness in conceptual thought and was hence fit to be "propedeutics of philosophical spirit at us". Albert Bazala, which inherited in 1909 Marković's department, abandons Herbart's system). He monitored all current spiritual movements, read German, French, English and other authors, and made his students known with their works, even if they were not sanctioned by him.

As the first professor of philosophy with a systematic teaching record, translating and writing in vernacular language (and not Latin or German), Marković made a substantial impact on the development of Croatian philosophical terminology.

In 1880 he promoted Đuro Arnold as the first Ph.D. in philosophy, who finally joined him in 1894 as a full professor. Arnold had, along with the philosophical teachings, lead the department of pedagogy. In 1904, he habilitated Albert Bazala as a private docent of philosophy.

== Philosophical orientation ==
Marković, the first Croatian professor of philosophy that was not a priest, cherished self-consciousness of philosophy as opposed to the scholastic tradition and neo-scholasticism, which was promoted at that time in vernacular writings by the professors of the Faculty of Theology and other theologians. On the other side, defending the metaphysics he was confronted with materialism and positivism, which reached Croatia at that period, and where he is followed by his disciple Albert Bazala. "Nothing valuable is produced by human labour without the vigorous, logical, aesthetic and ethic tendency, i.e. without philosophic tendency."

=== Herbart's school ===
In his lectures and writings he continued the metaphysical tradition of European school of thought, following essentially Herbart's formalism, which provides a compromise between the exactness of natural sciences and the metaphysical speculation, with an emphasis on the strictness of conceptual thought. He emphasized psychology as a starting point of philosophy (psychologism): "Her [of a philosophy] infinite, ultimately never reachable goal is a prudential system of cogitations and within it organised sentiments and aspirations."

Herbart's school, as hence the Marković himself, insist on maintaining diversity and irreducibility of psychic and material nature, especially contradicting materialist reducibility of former to the latter. He deems that "rational psychology and cosmology bear witness in favor of spiritism", i.e. against materialism: the matter is not sentient and free, and thus not subject to the law of causativity, so man's consciousness and freedom cannot possibly be a result of matter, but of higher and perfected being, i.e. the spirit.

=== Aesthetics ===
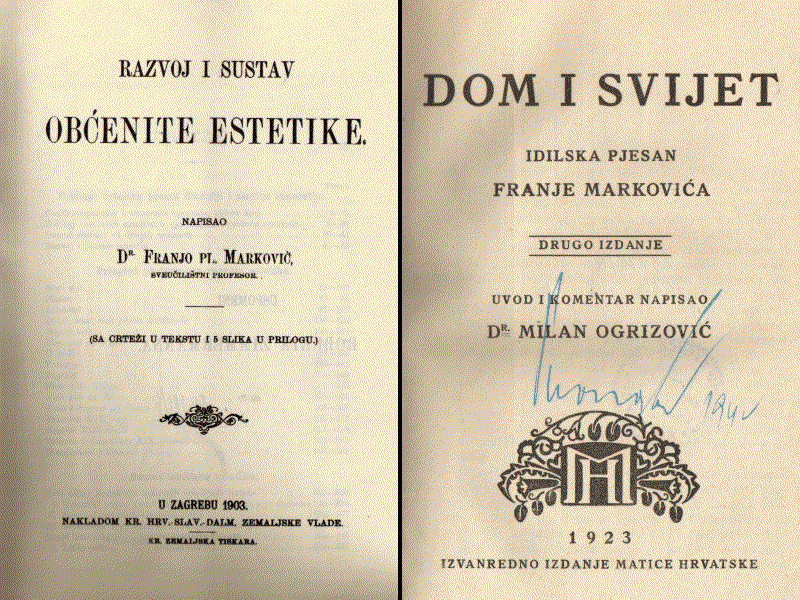
The cover pages of the Razvoj i sustav obćenite estetike ('The development and the system of general aesthetics'; Zagreb, 1903), and the Dom i svijet ('The home and the world'; Zagreb, 1923).

Aesthetically he's a formalist: aesthetic is only the form, not the content; this is where his scholarly personality suppressed his artistic predilections. The art must provide aesthetic pleasure; it should aspire to panhuman ideal, rise above the reality to the value. Therefore, Marković is not particularly supportive of naturalism and realism: naturalism simply depicts abject and vicious sides of life. The object of art must be beauteous not only by its form, but also venerable by its content. Illustrious artists are "folk teachers, the creators of life".

=== Ethics ===
In ethical issues he mostly diverged from formalistic confines of Herbart's school, taking interest into positivist and sociological currents and expressing his own, intensive ethical sentiment. He denounced naturalism, materialism and Darwin's theory of evolution, which lead to the "bankruptcy of ethics", giving prominence to either egoism, or "benefit to society, as understood by the public". Albert Bazala criticizes narrow-minded ethical principles of his teacher quite voluminously, and so does Gjuro Arnold.

=== Critical spirit and rising of the people ===
Marković applied Herbart's glorification of philosophy as a bellwether of culture to Croatian circumstances. He emphasizes the significance of industrious labor on the cognition and cultivation of critical spirit. Philosophy has a long-term educational task of rising people to the fulfillment of its potential. Philosophy is the "sentient cultural spirit", which metamorphosises and sets path towards prosperity of the nation and its "life style" in general. It creates "spiritual homeland", the "homeland of thoughts", which is the defender of material homeland. By learning from other nations, one has to develop distinctiveness and peculiarities at a path to the cognition of the ideal of truth, goodness and beauty. That is a duty not only to the people, but to the human kind itself: philosophy already brings individuals closer, and given enough time it shall unite even the nations.

== Literary work ==
Marković published a series of literary works, most important of which are the epics and the dramas in national-romanticist tradition. As opposed to the formalistic and racionalist conception of philosophy, "Marković his personal aspect, his sentimentalism and desireful ponderings ensconces under the veil of poetry."

Mostly dealing with the historical motifs, Marković engaged in the ongoing battle for the affirmation of Croatdom against Hungarian and German domination. Idyllic epic Dom i svijet ('The home and the world') elaborates on contemporary themes. Epic Kohan i Vlasta ('Kohan and Vlasta') portrays a battle of old Slavs and Germans on the Baltic. The tragedy Karlo Drački depicts man's suffering in the struggle for panhuman ideal of freedom against the Rome and Magyar feudal lords. The tragedies Benk bot and Zvonimir display vices and rapacity of Hungarian landlords and court. Marković also wrote poems, literary critics and studies. He composed lyrics for quire version of the song U boj! from the opera Nikola Šubić Zrinski.

== Philosophic works ==
Occupied by lecturing and literary work he published few pieces in philosophy. He published the book Razvoj i sustav obćenite estetike (1903).

His major books and general works published during his lifetime include:

- Estetička ocjena Gundulićeva "Osmana", Zagreb, 1877.
- O piscih filozofijske struke a hrvatskoga roda, "Vienac", 44/1881. (inaugural speech as a rector)
- Filosofijski rad Rugjera Josipa Boškovića, Zagreb, 1887.–1888.
- Etički sadržaj naših narodnih poslovica, Zagreb, 1889.
- Prilog estetičkoj nauci o baladi i romanci, Zagreb, 1899.
- Razvoj i sustav obćenite estetike, Zagreb, 1903.

In 1970 his selected works (Izabrana djela) were published in the edition Pet stoljeća hrvatske književnosti ('Five centuries of Croatian literature'), vol. 44.

A bulk of his lecture manuscripts has been preserved, some of which have been processed and published in the periodical Prilozi za istraživanje hrvatske filozofske baštine.

== Notes ==
Academic offices
Preceded by Aleksandar Bresztyenszky	Rector of the University of Zagreb; 1881–1882	Succeeded by Feliks Suk
