= Matica hrvatska =

Croatian cultural organization

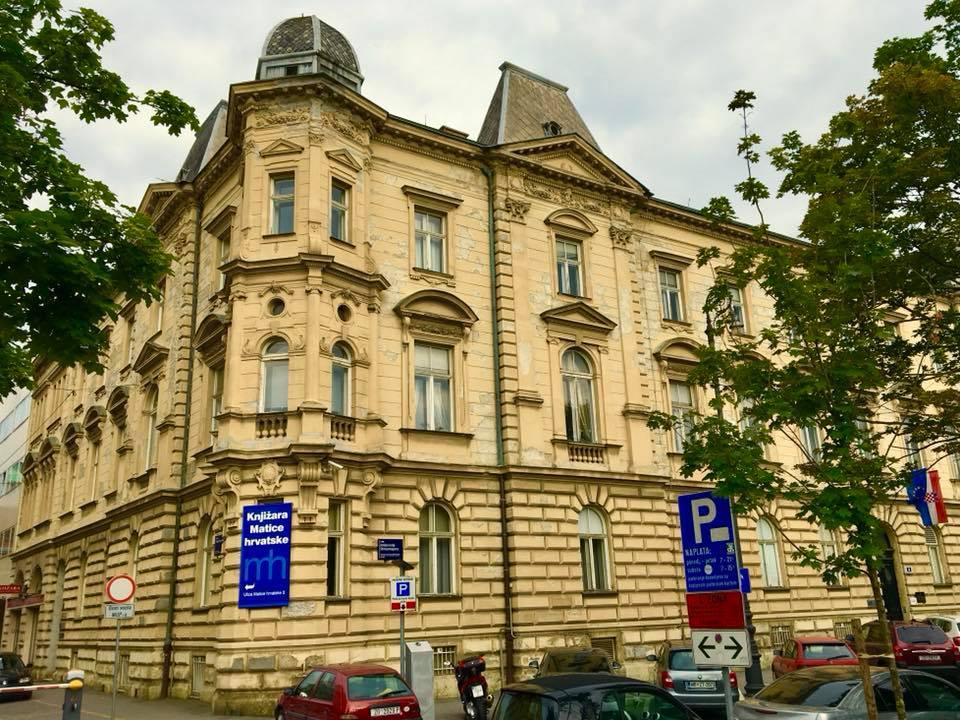
- Formation: 10 February 1842; 184 years ago
- Type: Cultural institution, Nonprofit and Non-governmental organization
- Headquarters: Ulica Matice hrvatske 2, Zagreb, Croatia
- Members: 3871 (2013)
- President: Damir Zorić
- Budget: €1,024,276 (2026)
- Website: www.matica.hr

Matica hrvatska (Latin: Matrix Croatica) is the oldest independent, non-profit and non-governmental Croatian national institution. It was founded on 2 February 1842 by the Croatian Count Janko Drašković and other prominent members of the Illyrian movement during the Croatian National Revival (1835–1874). Its main goals are to promote Croatian national and cultural identity in the fields of art, science, spiritual creativity, economy and public life as well as to care for social development of Croatia.

Today, in the Palace of Matica hrvatska in the centre of Zagreb more than hundred book presentations, scientific symposia, round table discussions, professional and scientific lectures and concerts of classical music are being organized annually.

Matica Hrvatska is also one of the largest and most important book and magazine publishers in Croatia. Magazines issued by Matica are Vijenac, Hrvatska revija and Kolo. Matica Hrvatska also publishes many books in one of its most famous editions called Stoljeća hrvatske književnosti (Centuries of Croatian literature).

As of 2018, Matica has 122 branches in: Austria (1), Belgium (1), Bosnia and Herzegovina (13), Croatia (98), Germany (3), Hungary (3), Montenegro (1), Serbia (1) and Slovenia (1).

== Etymology ==
The name Matica is best translated as "The Centre", although the term matica in this context translates as "queen bee" or "parent body", and the adjective hrvatska refers to Croatia and/or Croats. According to this, the name of Matica hrvatska can be literally translated into English as "Parent body of the Croats".

== History ==
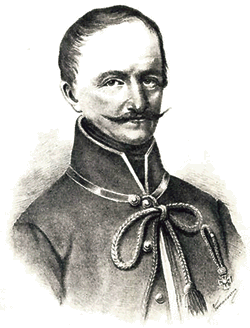
Janko Drašković, Croatian politician who served as the 1st president of Matica hrvatska

During the Croatian national revival there was a great need for the establishment of a book publishing company that would publish books with a nationalist content which were meant to be read on meetings of supporters of the Croatian national revival movement.

According to this need the Croatian parliament issued a conclusion in 1849 that the Society for fostering national language and literature should be established while the Illyrian reading room decided to establish Matica ilirska. Nothing changed because neither Government in Vienna nor one in Budapest wanted to confirm the Statute of the Society which was a necessary step for society to become a legal entity in order for it to legally act. The reason for the refusal to accept Statute of the Society was that the Government feared that the establishment of a cultural national institution would threaten the existence of the multiethnic Austrian Empire. Therefore, Count Janko Drašković proposed founding Matica as a part of the Illyrian reading room (Ilirska čitaonica) that was founded on 4 August 1838. Matica hrvatska was officially founded on 10 February 1842 in Zagreb as Matica ilirska. It was stated that its main purpose was: "Publication of old classical Illyrian, especially those from Dubrovnik, and other useful books from the latest writers on organic (Croatian) language." Janko Drašković said at the opening ceremony: "The main purpose of our society is to disseminate science and literature in our national language and to give the opportunity to our young people to educate themselves in the spirit of patriotism. We have many old and famous books from the 16th and 17th century written by writers like Andrija Čubranović, Dinko Ranjina, Dinko Zlatarić, Ivan Gundulić, Junije Palmotić, Ignjat Đurđević and many others that should be published in an organic (Croatian) language." From 1846 to 1886, with interruptions, Matica ilirska had its headquarters in the National home palace (Palača Narodni dom).

=== Matica dalmatinska ===
In 1862 the same organization as Matica ilirska was founded in Dalmatia, which was at the time Austrian Crown land in Cisleithania part of the Austrian Empire (since 1867 Austro-Hungarian Monarchy), as a result of the Congress of Vienna. Matica dalmatinska had the same role in Dalmatia as Matica ilirska had in Croatia and Slavonia. Its purpose was to care for croatian cultural and language in Dalmatia as well as to publish books and newspapers for the Croats that lived in Dalmatia. Its first president was Croatian politician from Zadar Miho Klaić. In 1912 Matica dalmatinska merged into Matica hrvatska.

=== First published books ===
The first two books published by Matica were printed in Vienna in 1844 because of the censorship imposed by the central Government on Croatia. These books were Osman, the 17th-century historical-romantic epic poem about events related to the life and reign of the Turkish Sultan Osman II, written by Ivan Gundulić and completed by Ivan Mažuranić; and Teuta, a drama about the Illyrian Queen Teuta and the tragic discord in her state which caused its destruction and subtraction of the freedom of her people, written by Dimitrija Demeter.

=== During Bach's absolutism ===
1840s and 1850s were particularly difficult for Matica ilirska. Although Statute of Matica was finally approved in 1847 book publishing and cultural life of the nation were not a priority at the moment due to the Hungarian Revolution of 1848. It was especially hard for Matica ilirska during the reign of Baron Alexander von Bach between 1850 and 1859, a period that is known in the history of the Austrian Empire as neo-absolutism or Bach's absolutism. Bach encouraged centralization of the Austrian Empire in favor of Vienna and Germanization. In Croatia, the Government and Parliament were abolished, Croatian counties lost their historical independence while German language became official. Matica ilirska started to work as an independent organization in 1850 after the Illyrian reading room was abolished. In this period Matica was publishing magazine Neven (1852–1857).

=== Matica ilirska and Yugoslav Academy of Sciences and Arts ===
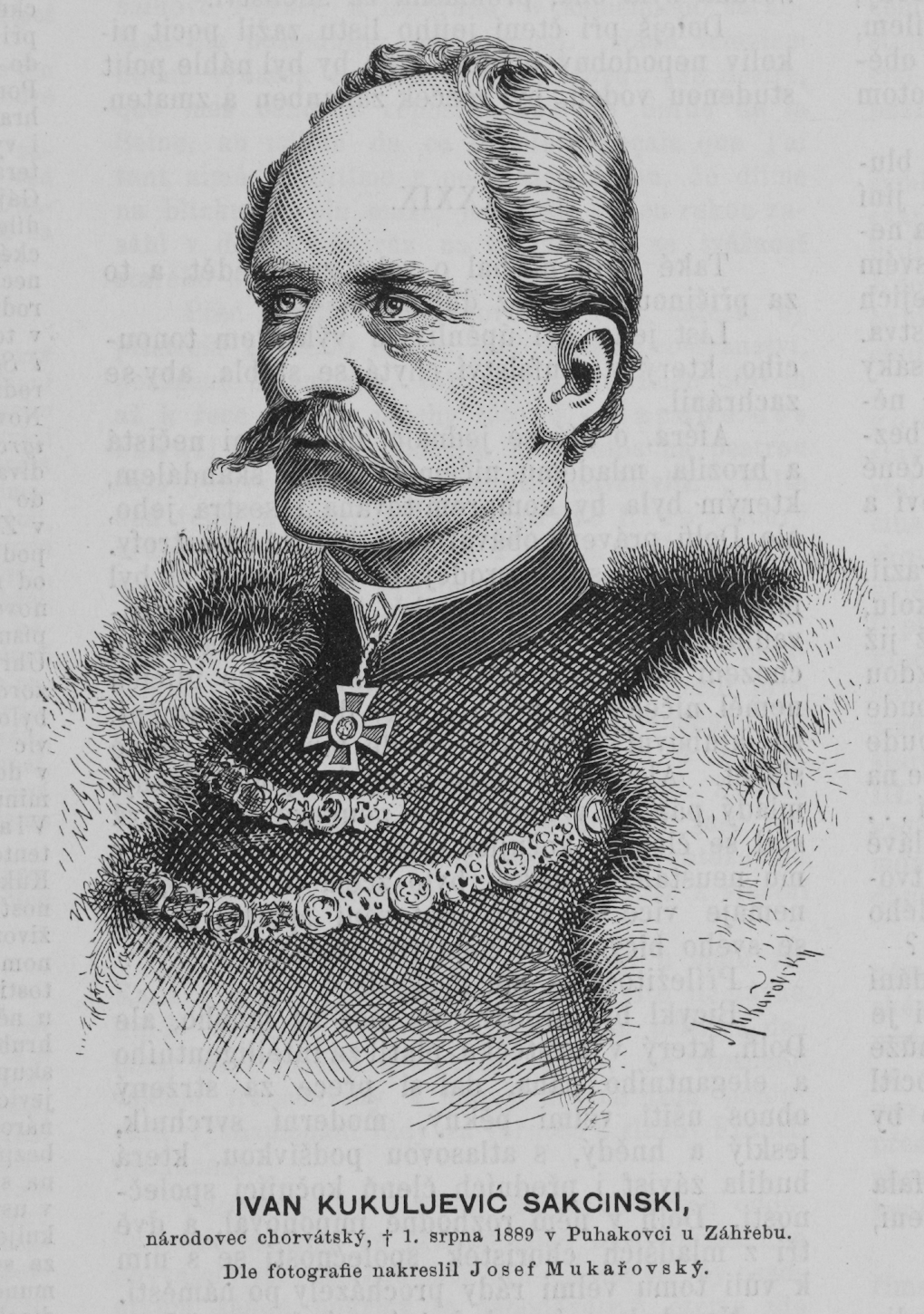
Ivan Kukuljević Sakcinski, Croatian politician who served as the 5th President of Matica hrvatska.

When the Yugoslav Academy of Sciences and Arts was founded in 1866 Matica ilirska joined with it so they could together print and publish literary and scientific books. However, due to many disagreements these institutions gradually ended cooperation.

During the presidency of Ivan Mažuranić Matica started to publish literary-science magazine Književnik (1864–1866) and Vijenac (1869–present). Also Hrvatsko kolo (1905–1961; 1905–1948 and 1952–1961 as an annual anthology; 1948–1952 as a newspaper) and Glas Matice hrvatske (1906–1909) were being published.

=== Rapid development ===
After Matica ilirska ended its cooperation with Yugoslav Academy of Sciences and Arts in 1874 it regained its full independence. In this period the president was Ivan Kukuljević Sakcinski during whose presidency Matica ilirska changed its name in Matica hrvatska because "the first name lost its role and attractiveness". In this period Matica assert itself as the largest publisher in Croatia because it published approximately 250 books. Its goal became publishing fine literature and not science (published by the Academy) nor oral literature (published by Croatian Literary Society of St. Jerome). On 17 March 1900 Matica hrvatska and Croatian Association of Artists founded Croatian Writers' Association. In this period Matica published works on many subject like: Croatian and world history (Tadija Smičiklas, Croatian history in two volumes); geography; paper manufacturing; printing; electricity; magnetism, ores; physics; chemistry; history of literature and art history. Matica also published classic novels written by best Croatian writers from Literary modernism as well as of those from Literary realism. These writers are: August Šenoa, Josip Eugen Tomić, Eugen Kumičić, Janko Leskovar and Vjenceslav Novak (modernism); Petar Preradović, Stanko Vraz, Luka Botić and Franjo Marković (realism). Two anthologies of Croatian poetry written by August Šenoa and Hugo Badalić were published as well. By the end of the 19th century Matica had had more than 400 sales representatives and nearly 10,000 subscribers.

=== After the First World War ===
After the First World War Croatia became a part of the new state Yugoslavia. During this post-war period Matica experienced a crisis which was manifested in a decline of the revenue that was caused by the decrease of purchasing power of the people due to war while the state wasn't giving any monetary assistance. However, despite this Matica published many books written by the prominent Croatian writers such as: Miroslav Krleža, August Cesarec, Vladimir Nazor, Milutin Cihlar Nehajev, Tin Ujević, Nikola Šop, Ivo Kozarčanin, Mile Budak, Ivan Goran Kovačić, Dragutin Tadijanović, Dobriša Cesarić, Mate Balota, Ivana Brlić-Mažuranić and Sida Košutić. After 1928 Matica started to publish magazine Hrvatska revija (1928–present). From 1931 to 1940 Matica was publishing or supported publishing of Omladina and Nastavni vjesnik, magazines for high school teachers and students, as well as magazines Hrvatska misao (Sarajevo, 1943–1944) and Hrvatski sjever (Osijek, 1944). From 1936 to 1943 Matica founded its first branches in Zagreb, Čakovec, Osijek, Sisak, Karlovac, Samobor, Varaždin, Vinkovci, Vukovar, Dubrovnik and Sarajevo.

=== During the Second World War ===
On 11 January 1941 Government of the Banovina of Croatia made a decision that the Steering and Supervisory Board of Matica would be dismissed and the Commissariat, led by Ante Martinović, established. After the Nazi invasion of Yugoslavia, a Nazi-puppet state, the so-called Independent State of Croatia (NDH) was established on the Croatian territory. During this period of occupation Matica has published books written by many domestic and foreign writers, and literature for young people. NDH Government made a decision that the Commissariat would be dismissed.

=== After the Second World War ===
From 1945 to 1991 Matica was active in SR Croatia that was member of the Yugoslav Federation since the end of World War II. It was difficult for Matica to work due to the negative attitude of the central government in Belgrade to the institution with a national character because Yugoslavia was distinctly multi-ethnic state and it was considered that any over-emphasis of nationalism could undermine the [apparent] unity of the people of Yugoslavia. Matica's buildings were nationalized and many other publishers also appeared. Regardless of these difficulties, Matica continued to actively publish various books, anthologies about Rijeka, Zadar and the Croatian National Revival, anthologies of legal texts, philosophical texts, art monographs, etc.

In December 1954 Novi Sad Agreement was signed. Matica hrvatska and Matica srpska started publishing a jointly-made orthography manual in 1960. Although widely praised by all levels of Serbian and Yugoslav party officials and intellectuals, the orthography was roundly criticized by Croatian intellectuals, who saw the work as too Serb-centric. Their criticisms stemmed mainly from an analysis of the case of larger differences between the two languages, claiming that the dictionary favored the eastern variant of the language over the Croatian. In 1960 Matica founded its Publishing Institute (Croatian: Nakladni institut).

Matica continued establishing its branches. In this period 55 branches were established. (Split (1953), Dubrovnik, Rijeka, Zadar (1954), Vinkovci (1959), Osijek, Požega (1961), Pula, Šibenik (1962), Pakrac, Sisak, Čakovec, Županja (1964), Karlovac, Umag, Poreč, Slavonski Brod, Križevci (1965), Varaždin, Koprivnica, Gospić (1966), Pazin, Rovinj (1969), Korčula, Jastrebarsko, Metković, Đakovo, Imotski, Orahovica (1970), Donji Miholjac, Bjelovar, Našice, Drniš, Otok, Ilok, Omiš, Virovitica, Nova Gradiška, Zaprešić, Blato, Petrinja, Samobor, Valpovo, Makarska, Novska, Kutina, Ozalj, Krapina, Podravska Slatina, Trogir, Ploče, Kaštel Sućurac, Sinj and Ogulin (1971).)

Matica hrvatska has had an important role in the standardization and promotion of the Croatian language. In 1971, during the Croatian Spring it ended the Novi Sad agreement and began to print Croatian works. Soon after 20 December 1971, its work was banned by the communist authorities.

It resumed work after the 1990 multi-party election, but before Croatian independence (officially on 8 December 1990). The organization has since opened over 130 local branches in Croatia and Bosnia and Herzegovina.

== Presidents ==
President			Term in office	
#	Portrait	Name	Took office	Left office
1		Janko Drašković	1842	1850
2		Ambroz Vranyczany	1851	1858
3		Ivan Mažuranić	1858	1872
4		Matija Mesić	1872	1874
5		Ivan Kukuljević Sakcinski	1874	1889
6		Tadija Smičiklas	1889	1901
7		Ivan Trnski	1901	
8		Đuro Arnold	1902	1908
9		Oton Kučera	1909	1916
10		Krsto Pavletić	1917	1918
11		Fran Tućan	1918	1920
12		Dragutin Domjanić	1921	1926
13		Albert Bazala	1927	
14		Filip Lukas	1928	1945
15		Mihovil Nikolić	1945	1949
16		Gustav Krklec	1950	1954
17		Jakša Ravlić	1954	1968
18		Hrvoje Iveković	1968	1970
19		Ljudevit Jonke	1970	1971
20		Petar Šegedin	1990	
21		Vlado Gotovac	1990	1996
22		Josip Bratulić	1996	2002
23		Igor Zidić	2002	2014
24		Stjepan Damjanović	2014	2018
25		Stipe Botica	2018	2021
26		Miro Gavran	2021	2025
27		Damir Zorić	2025	present

== Publications ==
- Hrvatska revija
- Kolo
- Vijenac

== See also ==
- Matica srpska
- Matica crnogorska
- Matica slovenská
- Slovenska matica
- Matice česká
