= Josip Pliverić =

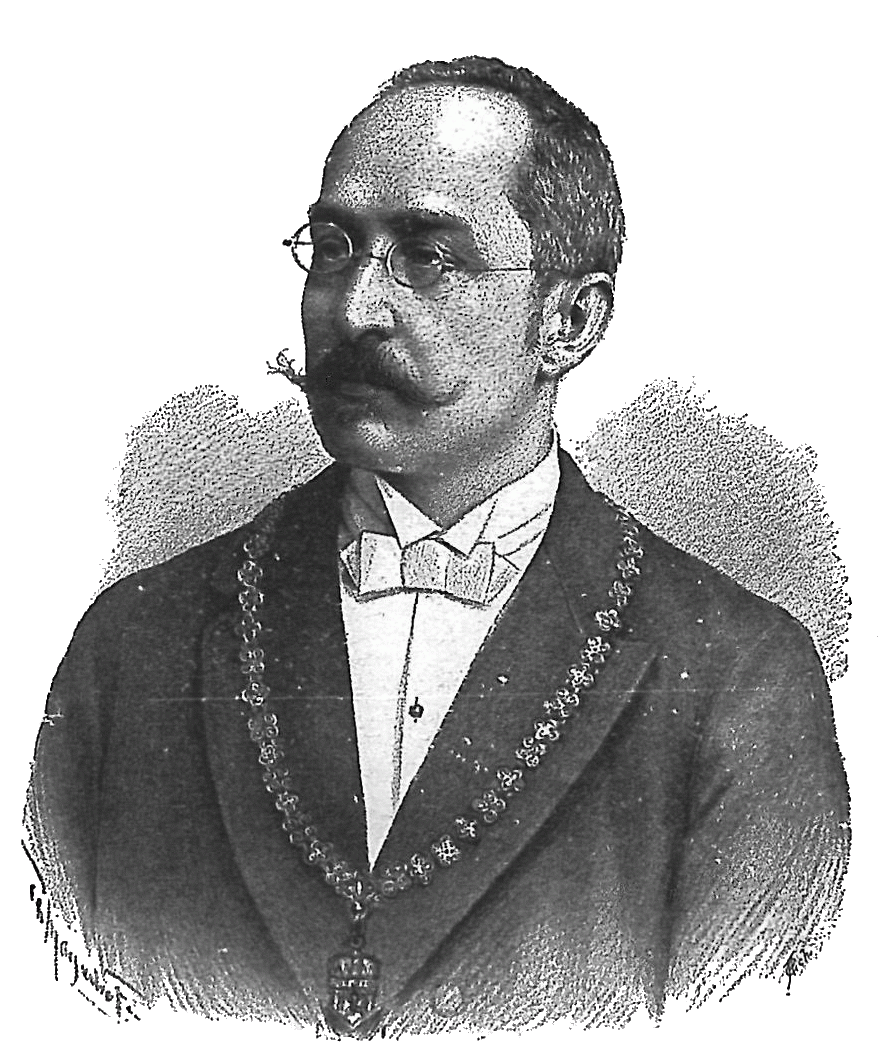
- Born: 4 February 1847; Nova Gradiška, Austrian Empire
- Died: 17 July 1907 (aged 60); Zagreb, Austria-Hungary

Josep Pliverić (Nova Gradiška, 4 February 1847 – Zagreb, 17 July 1907) was a Croatian lawyer, university professor, theorist of the Croatian state law and a Member of Croatian Parliament. Pliverić was rector of the University of Zagreb in the academic years 1892/1893 and 1904/1905, a professor at the Faculty of Law, member of the Croatian Parliament from 1892 until 1906 and elected Croatian member of the Diet of Hungary in Budapest.
