= Hrvatska prosvjeta =

Hrvatska prosvjeta was an influential Croatian Catholic periodical, that circulated in 1914-1940. It was printed in Zagreb. Its editorial committee included Hijacint Bošković, Ljubomir Maraković, Mate Ujević, Petar Grgec, and Ferdo Rožić.

The periodical's noteworthy contributors included Sida Košutić, Đuro Sudeta, Vinko Kos, Tadija Smičiklas. The periodical represented antitotalitarian views.
