= Vukanić =

Vukanić (Serbian: Вуканић) is a Serbian name, derived from the male given name Vukan. It may refer to:

- Nenad Vukanić (born 1974), Serbian-Montenegrin water polo player
- Dragan Vukanić,
- Nemanja Vukanić,
- Vukan Vukanić, Serbian painter

== See also ==
- Vukanović
