= Rudolf Vimer =

Croatian prebendary, rector and writer

- Born: 21 March 1863; Bjelovar, Military Frontier, Austrian Empire
- Died: 21 October 1933 (aged 70); Zagreb, Kingdom of Yugoslavia

Rudolf Vimer (21 March 1863 – 28 October 1933) was a Croatian prebendary, rector of the University of Zagreb, dean of the Catholic Faculty of Theology, corresponding member of the Yugoslav Academy of Sciences and Arts, writer, polyglot and benefactor.

== Biography ==
Rudolf Vimer was born in Bjelovar on March 21, 1863, as the ninth child in a family of Austrian origin. His uncle was a priest who helped him with his education. After finishing elementary school in Bjelovar, Vimer enrolled in Classical Gymnasium in Zagreb with help of the Archdiocese of Zagreb. He graduated with top grades. After finishing high school, Vimer went to study theology in Zagreb. He finished his studies in Vienna on the University Pázmáneum, and was ordained a priest in 1885 with only 22 years. He served his first Mass in Bjelovar in 1885 in the Parish Church of St. Teresa of Avila (now: Bjelovar Cathedral). At the same time Vimer served as a chaplain in Karlovac (later in Zagreb in the Parish of St. Petar), prefect of the Zagreb Archdiocese Seminary and teacher of religious studies in elementary schools. From 1890, Vimer served as a catechist at the Zagreb Upper Town Gymnasium and longtime Prefect of the Noble Convict.

After Vimer received a doctorate in theology in Vienna in 1892, he was appointed assistant professor at the Catholic Faculty of Theology at the Department of Oriental Languages (Arabic, Syriac, and Chaldean). In 1895 he received a scholarship from the Provincial Government of Croatia, Slavonia, and Dalmatia so he went on a scientific journey through the Middle East. He traveled throughout Palestine, Syria, and Egypt and took part in an expedition to Mount Sinai.

After Vimer came back from his journey, he became a full-time professor of Introductory Science to the New Testament and the Interpretation of Scripture. Because of his reputation as a scholar, he was elected as a dean of the Faculty, the Rector of the University of Zagreb (1900/1901) and a corresponding member of the Yugoslav Academy of Sciences and Arts. He was fluent in most of the European languages, including Latin, Greek, and many oriental languages. Vimer visited many major European libraries and libraries of the Middle East. He was a prolific writer of biblical themes. He wrote the best Croatian "Biography of Jesus Christ in three books", and "The Life of the St. Paul." He is also known as a great humanist. He was helping to poor and was organizing work of many charitable and cultural institutions. He donated his rich library to the Catholic Faculty of Theology.

In his late years, he left 100,000 Austrian krones for building a Franciscan monastery in his hometown of Bjelovar, which was later achieved. He died in Zagreb on October 28, 1933, and was buried in common priests grave at Mirogoj Cemetery.

== Works ==
- Introduction to the Holy Books of the New Testament (Uvod u svete knjige Novoga Zavjeta) (1903)
- Life of St. Paul (Život svetoga Pavla) (1907)
- Passion of our Lord Jesus Christ (Muka Gospodina našega Isusa Krista) (1910)
