= Josip Šilović =

Croatian jurist and university professor

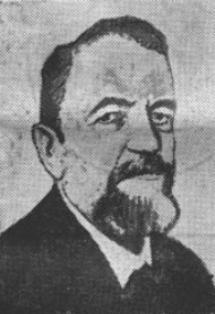
- Born: 8 September 1858; Praputnjak, Austrian Empire (now Croatia)
- Died: 9 May 1939 (aged 80); Zagreb, Banovina of Croatia, Kingdom of Yugoslavia (now Croatia)
- Education: University of Zagreb
- Known for: Charitable, scientific and political work

Josip Šilović (8 September 1858 – 9 May 1939) was a Croatian jurist and university professor who served as a rector of the University of Zagreb, member of the Croatian Parliament, senator in the Parliament of Yugoslavia and first Ban of the Sava Banovina.

== Early life and education ==
Josip Šilović was born 8 September 1858 in a small village of Praputnjak near Bakar to an emigrant forest worker who died at work leaving a widow with four children. Šilović's early life in poverty was associated with his exceptional humanitarian work later in life. After graduating law and rehabilitation, he acquired a Ph.D. in law in 1884 at the Faculty of Law and Administrative Sciences.

== Career ==
After working in judiciary and administration from 1883 until 1894, he started working as a full-time professor of civil law and civil procedure (1894-1897), and criminal law, criminal procedure, and philosophy of law (1894-1924) at the Zagreb Faculty of Law. In academic year 1898/99, he served as rector of the University of Zagreb. He was a founder of modern Croatian teaching of criminal law. Šilović was fluent in five languages and good in shorthand. Šilović was an MP for the liberal People's Party in the Croatian Parliament. In addition, he served as Ban of Sava Banovina from 1929 to 1931.

== Charity work ==
In addition to his regular job at the University, Šimović was intensively conducting charitable activities. He was a longtime president of a humanitarian organization National Defense-Union of Charities and one of the editors of the National Defense publication. He was often called "father of Croatian social policies, especially child protection" and "promoter of charity and humanitarian actions".

During the First World War, Šimović served as Director of the Office for Assisting War Victims. His credits include saving a large number of starving children and young people from Istria, Bosnia and Dalmatia.

== Works ==
- Self-defense (Nužna obrana) (1890)
- Criminal Law (Kazneno pravo) (1893)
- Free Will and the Criminal Law (Slobodna volja i kazneno pravo) (1899)
- Suspended Sentence (Uvjetna osuda) (1912)
- Causes of Crimes (Uzroci zločina) (1913)
- Criminal Law: General Part (Kazneno pravo: Opći dio) (1929)
