= University of Zagreb =

Public university in Zagreb, Croatia

- Sveučilište u Zagrebu
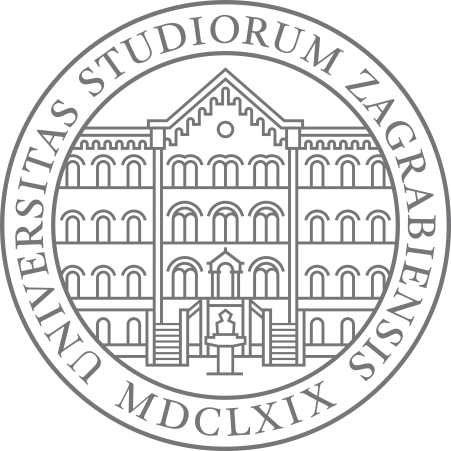
- Latin: Universitas Studiorum Zagrabiensis
- Type: Public
- Established: 23 September 1669; 356 years ago
- Affiliations: European University Association
- Endowment: 557 million HRK – 73,57 million EUR (2019)
- Budget: 2456.3 million HRK – 324.5 million EUR (2019)
- Rector: Stjepan Lakušić
- Faculty: 7,963 (2012)
- Students: 68,935 (2015)
- Postgraduates: 7243 (2007)
- Doctoral students: 842 (2007)
- Location: Zagreb, Croatia; 45°48′38.42″N 15°58′12.35″E
- Campus: City wide, central
- Colours
- Website: unizg.hr

The University of Zagreb (Croatian: Sveučilište u Zagrebu, Latin: Universitas Studiorum Zagrabiensis) is a public research university in Zagreb, Croatia. It is the largest Croatian university and one of the oldest continuously operating universities in Europe.

The history of the University began on 23 September 1669, when the Holy Roman Emperor Leopold I issued a decree granting the establishment of the Jesuit Academy of the Royal Free City of Zagreb. The decree was accepted at the Council of the Croatian Kingdom on 3 November 1671. The Academy was run by the Jesuits for more than a century until the order was dissolved by Pope Clement XIV in 1773. In 1776, Empress Maria Theresa issued a decree founding the Royal Academy of Science which succeeded the previous Jesuit Academy. Bishop Josip Juraj Strossmayer proposed the founding of a University to the Croatian Parliament in 1861. Emperor Franz Joseph signed the decree on the establishment of the University of Zagreb in 1869. The Act of Founding was passed by the Parliament in 1874, and was ratified by the Emperor on 5 January 1874. On 19 October 1874 the Royal University of Franz Joseph I was officially opened.

The University is composed of 29 faculties, 3 art academies and 1 university center with more than 70,000 students.

== History ==
=== Academy ===
The beginnings of the later university date back to 23 September 1669 when Emperor and King Leopold I Habsburg issued a decree granting the establishment of the Jesuit Academy of the Royal Free City of Zagreb. According to that document the study of philosophy in Zagreb acquired a formal and legal status as Neoacademia Zagrabiensis and officially became a public institution of higher education.

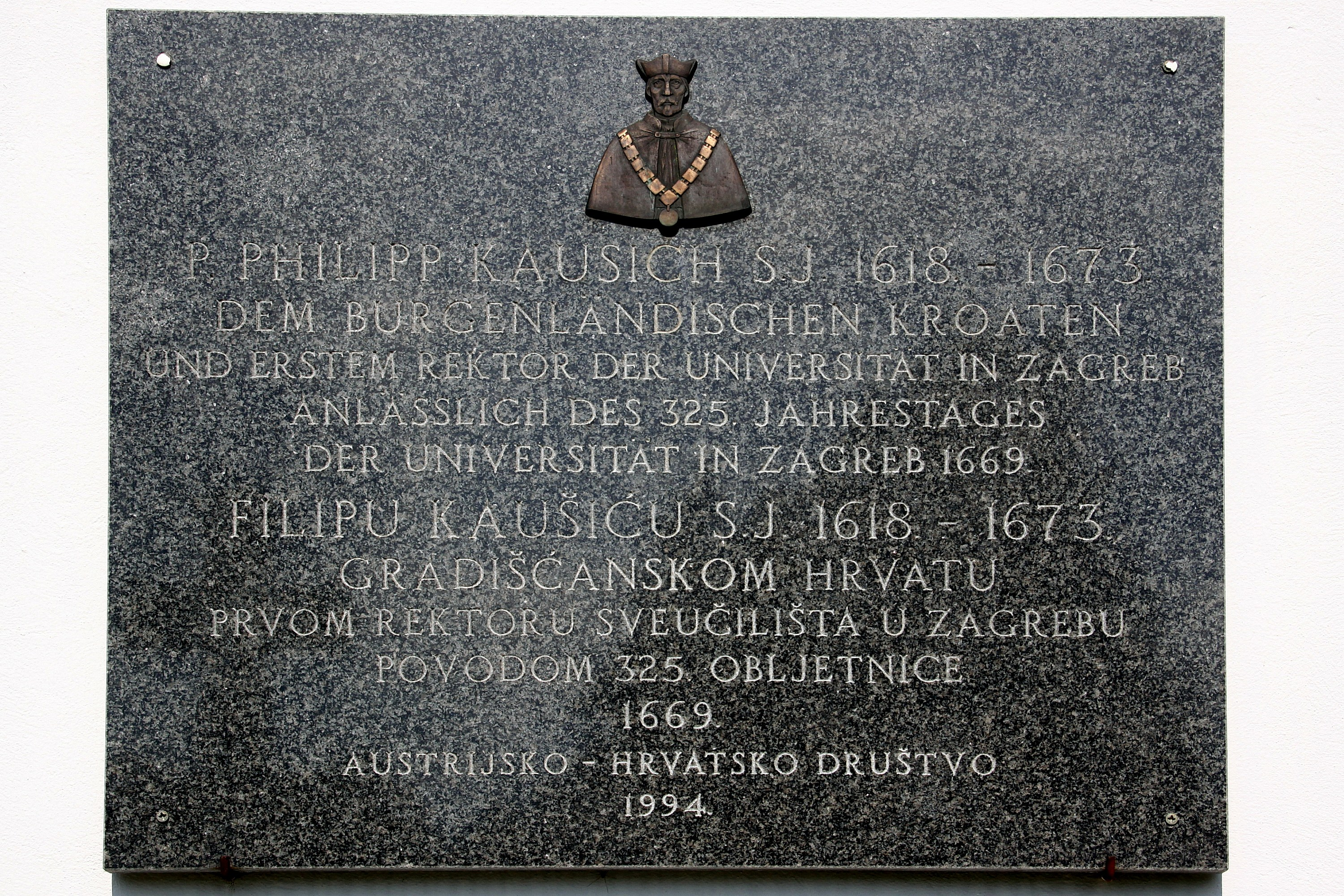
Filip Kaušić (1618–1673) was the first rector of the Academy

The academy was run by the Jesuits for more than a century until the order was dissolved by Pope Clement XIV in 1773. Under a new leadership in 1772 the academy enrolled a total of 200 students.

In 1776 Empress and Queen Maria Theresa issued a decree founding the Royal Academy of Science (Latin: Regia Scientiarum Academia). It consisted of three studies or faculties of philosophy, theology, and law. The former political-cameral studies became part of the newly established faculty of law, and thus were integrated into the academy. Each of the faculties of the Royal Academy of Sciences had several chairs teaching one or several courses. During the Austro-Turkish War of 1788–1791 and following the Austrian occupation of Belgrade on 8 October 1789 the Royal Academy requested to be granted the university status with the following argumentation:

If we consider the current circumstances in which serious consideration is given not only to the removal of obstacles to science, but also to the appointment of our local citizens to all services in these kingdoms, and if we also consider for a moment future opportunities, not only that the part of Croatia that is still sobbing under the Turkish yoke but also the kingdoms of Bosnia and Serbia – [...] – will be liberated and that these glorious kingdoms will be almost expanded. We believe that it is not only proud and useful, but also absolutely necessary to have in our environment such a university in which – when all obstacles to scientific work are removed and when funds for its development are obtained – number of local youth will be educated in all the sciences and noble skills for performing various services in their homeland.

The academy in Zagreb remained until 1874, despite numerous organizational changes, the focal institution of higher education in Croatia, educating most of the members of the Croatian intelligentsia.

=== University ===
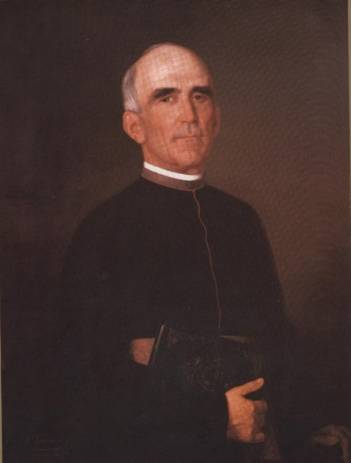
Matija Mesić, first rector of the University

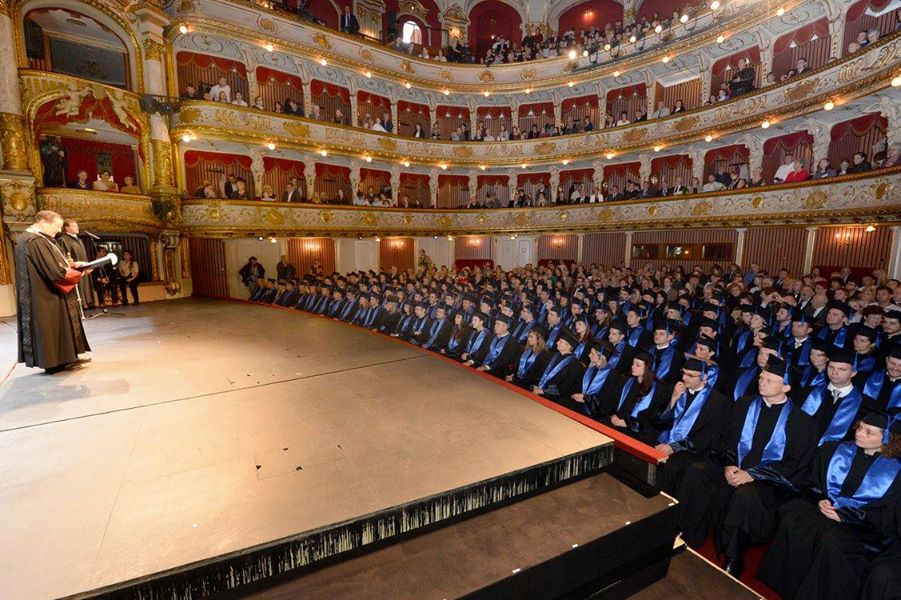
Promotion of new PhDs in 2015

Bishop Josip Juraj Strossmayer in 1861 proposed to the Croatian Parliament the founding of a university at Zagreb. During his visit in 1869, the Emperor Franz Joseph signed the decree on the establishment of the University of Zagreb. Five years later, the Parliament passed the Act of Founding, which was ratified by the Emperor on 5 January 1874. On 19 October 1874, a ceremony was held in the name of the founding of the Royal University of Franz Joseph I in Zagreb, making it the third university in the Hungarian realm of the Austro-Hungarian Empire.

In 1874 the University had four faculties:

- Law (Pravno-državoslovni fakultet)
- Theology (Bogoslovni fakultet)
- Philosophy (Mudroslovni fakultet)
- Medicine (Liječnički fakultet)

The Faculty of Medicine was not put into function in 1874; it had to wait until 1917. The Faculty of Philosophy served as the general scientific faculty. Since 1876 it had geology, botany, physics, mathematics, and chemistry; since 1877 zoology; since 1882 pharmacy; since 1883 geography.

In 1860, the Royal Agriculture and Forestry College was founded in Križevci. In 1898, the Academy of Forestry (Šumarska akademija) was founded as part of the Faculty of Philosophy, which encompassed all technical studies. In 1919, this school became the Faculty of Husbandry and Forestry.

In 1919, the School of Technology (Tehnička visoka škola) was founded, which was transformed into a university faculty in 1926. Also in 1919 the School of Veterinary Medicine (Veterinarska visoka škola) was founded; it transformed into a university faculty in 1925. From 1920 to 1924 shortly existed Faculty of Eastern Orthodox Theology with idea to establish it appearing for the first time already in 1861.

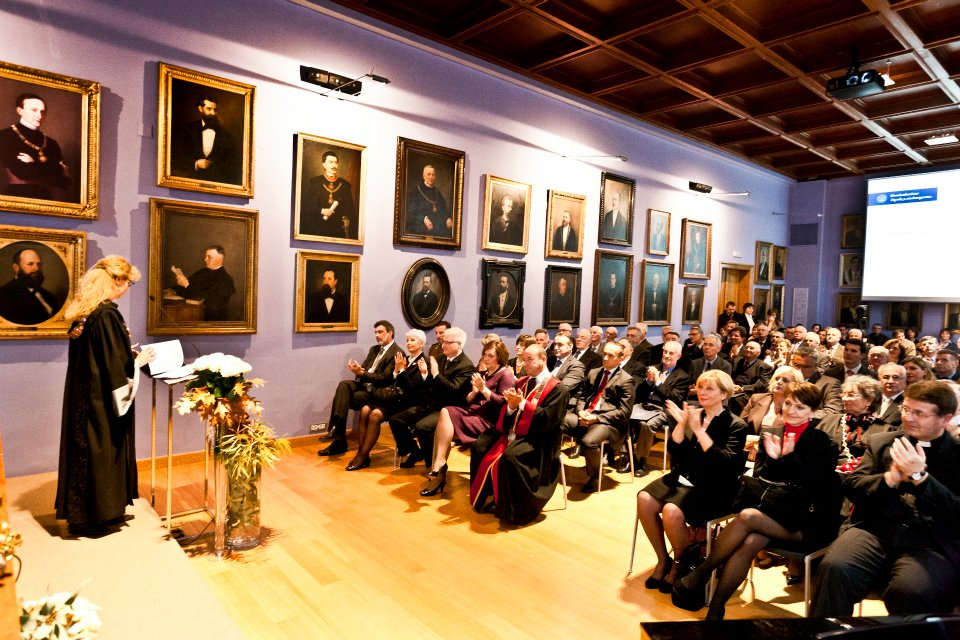
Great Hall of the University

In the Faculty of Philosophy, major reorganization ensued in the 1920s, as mathematics, pharmacy and other sciences started to split off, first with the creation of separate mathematics and pharmaceutical departments in 1928, when the faculty was renamed into its current name Filozofski fakultet.

In 1926, the university was composed of seven faculties:

- Theology (Bogoslovni fakultet)
- Law (Pravnički fakultet)
- Medicine (Liječnički fakultet)
- Philosophy (Mudroslovni fakultet)
  - Philosophy dept. (Filozofski odjel)
  - Pharmacy dept. (Farmaceutski odjel)
- Husbandry and Forestry (Gospodarsko-šumarski fakultet)
- Veterinary Medicine (Veterinarski fakultet)
- Technology (Tehnički fakultet)
  - Construction dept. (Građevni odsjek)
  - Engineering dept. (Strojarski odsjek)
  - Chemical engineering dept. (Kemijsko-inženjerski odsjek)

On 26 August 1936 a group of Macedonian students belonging to the MANAPO signed the Political Declaration, an illegal document requesting political and social emancipation of Macedonians in the Kingdom of Yugoslavia.

During the Independent State of Croatia (1941–1945), the university was known as the Croatian University (Hrvatsko sveučilište).

The individual departments of the Faculty of Philosophy became separate faculties in 1942, 1946 when the Faculty of Sciences was formed, and finally in 1963.

In 1956, the Faculty of Technology was divided into four faculties:

- Architecture-Construction-Geodesy (Arhitektonsko-građevinsko-geodetski fakultet)
- Electrical engineering (Elektrotehnički fakultet)
- Mechanical engineering-Shipbuilding (Strojarsko-brodograđevni fakultet)
- Chemistry-Food technology-Mining (Tehnološki fakultet)

These eventually split up into the current layout.

In 1999, the University decided to implement European Credit Transfer System – ECTS. When Croatia signed to be a part of The Bologna declaration, all of the universities in Croatia adopted this system of easily readable and comparable degrees.

University offers 160 undergraduate programmes (ba/bsc), 22 integrated undergraduate-graduate programmes, 9 vocational undergraduate programmes, 174 graduate programmes (ma/msc), 1 vocational graduate programme, 72 doctoral programmes (PhD) and 165 specialist postgraduate programmes.

== Faculties ==
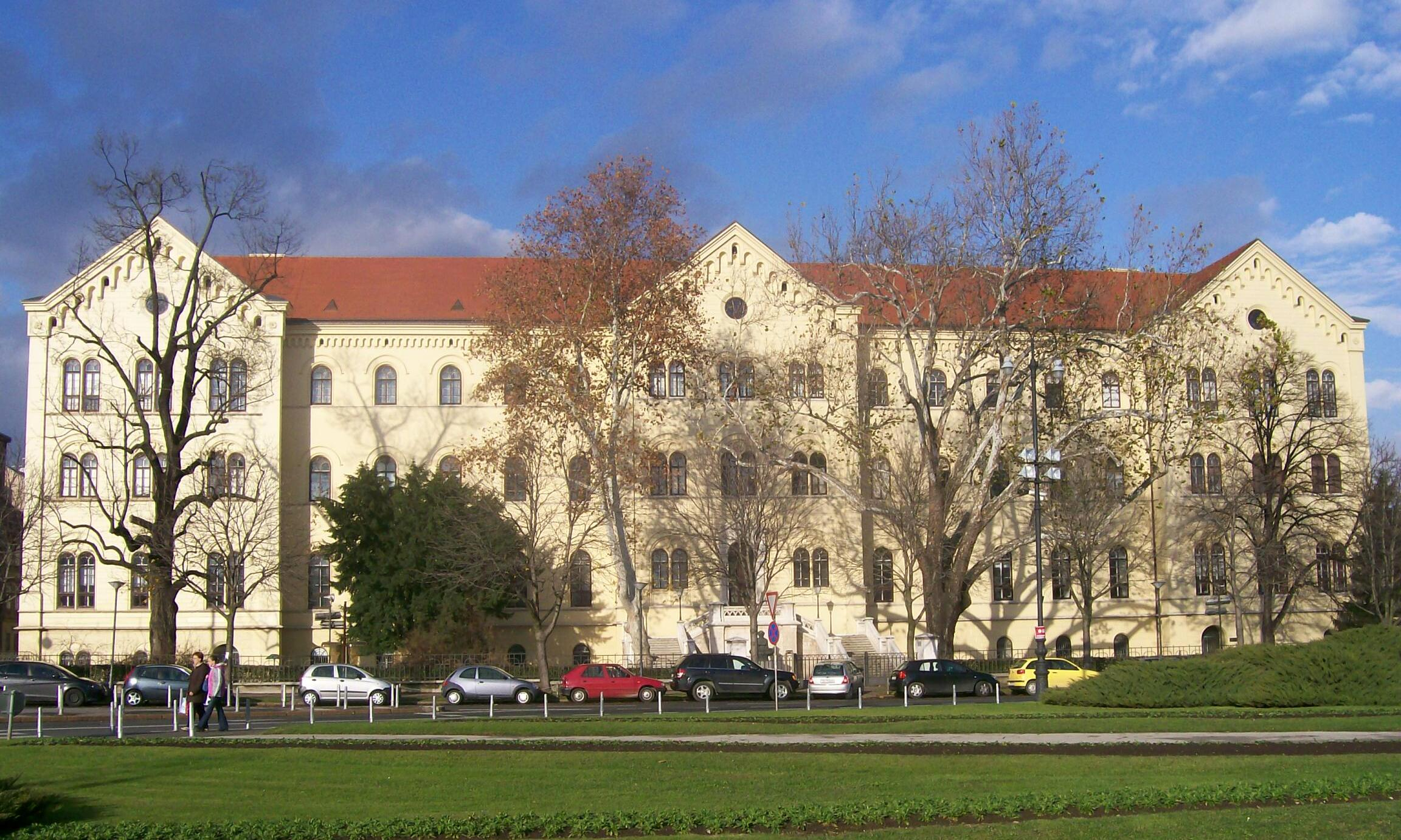
Palace of the University and the Faculty of Law, Republic of Croatia Square

Natural sciences

- Faculty of Science

Engineering

- Faculty of Architecture
- Faculty of Chemical Engineering and Technology
- Faculty of Civil Engineering
- Faculty of Electrical Engineering and Computing
- Faculty of Geodesy
- Faculty of Geotechnics (in Varaždin)
- Faculty of Graphic Arts
- Faculty of Mechanical Engineering and Naval Architecture
- Faculty of Metallurgy (in Sisak)
- Faculty of Mining, Geology and Petroleum Engineering
- Faculty of Textile Technology
- Faculty of Transport and Traffic Sciences

Biomedical sciences

- Faculty of Pharmacy and Biochemistry
- Faculty of Veterinary Medicine
- School of Dental Medicine
- School of Medicine

Biotechnology

- Faculty of Agriculture
- Faculty of Food Technology and Biotechnology
- Faculty of Forestry

Social sciences

- Faculty of Economics and Business
- Faculty of Kinesiology
- Faculty of Law
- Faculty of Organization and Informatics in Varaždin
- Faculty of Political Science
- Faculty of Special Education and Rehabilitation
- Faculty of Teacher Education

Humanities

- Catholic Faculty of Theology
- Faculty of Humanities and Social Sciences
- Faculty of Croatian Studies
- Faculty of Philosophy and Religious Sciences

The arts

- Academy of Dramatic Art
- Academy of Fine Arts
- Academy of Music

=== Philosophy and Religious Sciences ===
Faculty of Philosophy and Religious Sciences
- Former name: Faculty of Philosophy of the Society of Jesus (FFDI)
- Type: Jesuit, Catholic
- Established: 1662; 364 years ago
- Chancellor: Dalibor Renić
- Dean: Prof. Ivan Koprek
- Location: Jordanovac 110, HR-10 000 Zagreb, Croatia
- Website: FFRZ

Faculty of Philosophy and Religious Sciences (FFRZ) is a part of the University of Zagreb, Croatia It remains a work of the Society of Jesus and traces its origins to 1662.

FFRZ in Zagreb began as a Jesuit school of philosophy on 6 November 1662 with the establishment of the Philosophy Department at Zagreb College, which would become the University of Zagreb.

The Faculty of Philosophy of the Society of Jesus (FFDI) closed in 1773 due to the suppression of the Society of Jesus, and the Jesuit philosophy school in Zagreb did not reopen until 1937, when it offered a three-year course leading to the licentiate in philosophy, as it does today.

On 31 July 1989 the Congregation for Catholic Education of the Holy See decreed that the Faculty of Philosophy could confer the baccalaureate, licentiate, and doctorate in philosophy.

With a decision of 7 October 1992, the Ministry of Science and Technology entered FFDI into the register as a Scientific Research Organization in philosophy and it became a part of the Croatian Studies Department of the University of Zagreb.

On 8 December 2016, the Senate of the University of Zagreb determined that FFDI would become a faculty and equal component of the University under the title Faculty of Philosophy and Religious Sciences (FFRZ).

Undergraduates may major in Philosophy and Religious Sciences, Philosophy, or Philosophy and Latin Language. Graduate students may major in Philosophy or Religious Science. FFRZ also offers post-graduate studies.

FFRZ has a formal relationship with Laudato TV to "work together to promote and implement educational, cultural and scientific activities in the Christian and humanistic atmosphere".

In 2017 there were two current research studies at the Faculty of Philosophy and Religious Sciences:

- Practical ethics and commitment to the common good in times of crisis. Is there a place for virtue in Croatian society?
- Christian philosophy within the Croatian philosophy of the 20th century.

On 5 May 2017 a symposium was held on "Religions and Migration: Displaced Persons and Refugees".

The faculty is led by a chancellor and his deputy along with a dean and vice-dean. The chancellor is Arturo Sosa, General Superior of the Society of Jesus based in Rome. His deputy is Dalibor Renić, Provincial Superior of the Croatian Province of the Society of Jesus based in Zagreb. The dean is Prof. Ivan Koprek, The Faculty Council is composed of all regular and extraordinary professors and the Faculty Conference includes all current lecturers, student representatives, and faculty officials.

== Rectors ==
1. Matija Mesić (1874–75)
2. Stjepan Spevec (1875–76)
3. Anton Kržan (1876–77)
4. Konstantin Vojnović (1877–78)
5. Franjo Maixner (1878–79)
6. Franjo Iveković (1879–80)
7. Aleksandar Bresztyenszky (1880–81)
8. Franjo Marković (1881–82)
9. Feliks Suk (1882–83)
10. Blaž Lorković (1883–84)
11. Đuro Pilar (1884–85)
12. Gustav Baron (1885–86)
13. Franjo Vrbanić (1886–87)
14. Tadija Smičiklas (1887–88)
15. Antun Franki (1888–89)
16. Luka Marjanović (1889–90)
17. Natko Nodilo (1890–91)
18. Ivan Bujanović (1891–92)
19. Josip Pliverić (1892–93)
20. Vinko Dvořák (1893–94)
21. Antun Maurović (1894–95)
22. Franjo Spevec (1895–96)
23. Armin Pavić (1896–97)
24. Juraj Dočkal (1897–98)
25. Josip Šilović (1898–99)
26. Đuro Arnold (1899–1900)
27. Rudolf Vimer (1900–01)
28. Franjo Vrbanić (1901–02)
29. Vjekoslav Klaić (1902–03)
30. Ivan Bujanović (1903–04)
31. Josip Pliverić (1904–05)
32. Antun Heinz (1905–06)
33. Antun Bauer (1906–07)
34. Milivoj-Klement Maurović (1907–08)
35. Gustav Janeček (1908–09)
36. Josip Volović (1909–10)
37. Julije Rorauer (1910–11)
38. Julije Domac (1911–12)
39. Josip Pazman (1912–13)
40. Edo Lovrić (1913–14)
41. Đuro Korbler (1914–15)
42. Fran Barac (1915–16)
43. Ernest Miler (1916–17)
44. Julije Golik (1917–18)
45. Ivan Angelo Ruspini (1918–19)
46. Ladislav Polić (1919–20)
47. Karlo Radoničić (1920–21)
48. Vladimir Varićak (1921–22)
49. Đuro Nenadić (1922–23)
50. Stjepan Zimmerman (1923–24)
51. Ladislav Polić (1924–25)
52. Drago Perović (1925–26)
53. Ernest Miler (1926–28)
54. Josip Belobrk (1928–32)
55. Albert Bazala (1932–33)
56. Đuro Stipetić (1933–35)
57. Stanko Hondl (1935–37)
58. Edo Lovrić (1937–38)
59. Andrija Živković (1938–40)
60. Stjepan Ivšić (1940–43)
61. Božidar Špišić (1943–44)
62. Stjepan Horvat (1944–45)
63. Andrija Štampar (1945–46)
64. Grga Novak (1946–47)
65. Andro Mohorovičić (1947–49)
66. Marko Kostrenčić (1949–50)
67. Antun Barac (1950–51)
68. Fran Bošnjaković (1951–52)
69. Teodor Varićak (1952–53)
70. Željko Marković (1953–54)
71. Hrvoje Iveković (1954–56)
72. Zoran Bujas (1956–58)
73. Marijan Horvat (1958–60)
74. Vladimir Serdar (1960–63)
75. Slavko Macarol (1963–66)
76. Jakov Sirotković (1966–68)
77. Ivan Supek (1968–72)
78. Predrag Vranicki (1972–76)
79. Drago Grdenić (1976–78)
80. Ivan Jurković (1978–82)
81. Zvonimir Krajina (1982–86)
82. Vladimir Stipetić (1986–88)
83. Zvonimir Šeparović (1988–90)
84. Marijan Šunjić (1990–98)
85. Branko Jeren (1998–2002)
86. Tomislav Ivančić (2001)^{*}
87. Helena Jasna Mencer (2002–06)
88. Aleksa Bjeliš (2006–14)
89. Damir Boras (2014–22)
90. Stjepan Lakušić (2022–)

^{*} Ivančić was elected rector in 2001, but resigned for health reasons before his term started.

Source: List of rectors at the University of Zagreb website

== Rankings ==
University rankings

Global – Overall
- ARWU World: 401–500 (2023)
- QS World: 701-710 (2026)
- THE World: 1001–1200 (2024)
- USNWR Global: =517 (2023)

Regional – Overall
- QS Emerging Europe and Central Asia: 47 (2022)

As of 2020, the university ranked 801–1000 by QS, ranking 575 by USN, ranking 512 by CWUR, ranked 401–500 by ARWU, and 1001+ by THE.

== Legacy ==
Since 1874, more than 200,000 students have received a bachelor's degree, more than 18,000 a master's, and more than 8,000 a doctorate from the University of Zagreb.

== Sports ==
The University of Zagreb was a co-organiser (with the University of Rijeka) of the 2016 European Universities Games.

The university was also awarded by EUSA as the best (2016, 2019, 2023) and the most active European university in sport activities (2019 and 2023).

== Awards ==
=== Honorary degrees ===
Tadija Smičiklas, 1913.; Eugen Habsburški, 1915.; Svetozar Borojević, 1915.; Matija Stepinac, 1918.; Robert William Seton-Watson, 1920.; Milan Rojc, 1920.; Tomáš Garrigue Masaryk, 1920.; Frane Bulić, 1921.; Vladimir Mažuranić, 1925.; Nikola Tesla, 1926.; Antun Akšamović, 1926.; Dragutin Gorjanović Kramberger, 1927.; Slobodan Jovanović, 1927.; Đuro Arnold, 1930.; Milan Jovanović Batut, 1931.; Slavko Zimmerman, 1934.; Nikola Jagić, 1936.; Lavoslav Ružička, 1940.; Vladimir Nazor, 1946.; Vladimir Prelog, 1952.; Stepan Prokopovič Timošenko, 1956.; Niels Henrik David Bohr, 1958.; Robert Robinson, 1960.; Mislav Demerac, 1960.; Alfons Kauders, 1960.; Božo Milanović, 1962.; Pavao Butorac, 1964.; Sarvepalli Radhakrishnan, 1965.; Julije Budisavljević, 1968.; Fran Kogoj, 1968.; Josip Broz Tito, 1969.; Lev Andrejevič Arcimovič, 1969.; Ernest Bloch, 1969.	David Cuthbertson, 1969.; Giacomo Devoto, 1969.; Werner Karl Heisenberg, 1969.; Dorothy Crowfoot Hodgkin, 1969.; Roman Jacobson, 1969.; Győrgy Lukács, 1969.; Nikolaus Pevsner, 1969.; André Vaillant, 1969.; Franjo Kuharić, 1970.; Franz König, 1970.; Karlo Balić, 1970.; Vilim Keilbach, 1970.; Ivan Ostojić, 1970.; Mijo Škvorc, 1970.; Antun Zaninović, 1970.; Đorđe Mano-Zisi, 1970.; Anton Slobodnjak, 1970.; Vjekoslav Štefanić, 1970.; Fran Bošnjaković, 1970.; Stanko Šilović, 1970.; Anton Dolenc, 1970.; Josip Lončar, 1970.; Željko Kovačević, 1970.; Vinko Mandekić, 1970.; Albert Ogrizek, 1970.; Alois Tavčar, 1970.; Charles Herbert Best, 1976.; Karol Borsuk, 1976.; Heinz Ellenberg, 1976.; Henri Lefevbre, 1976.; Vladimir Bakarić, 1977.; Jean-Marie Péres, 1978.; Helmut Wolf, 1981.	Jakov Blažević, 1981.; Branko Fučić, 1985.; Jean Dausset, 1985.; Victor Papanek, 1985.; Ermin Teply, 1987.; Primo Nebiolo, 1987.; Cornelius C. A. Voskuil, 1987.; Štefan László, 1987.; Marija A. Pantelić, 1988.; Rudolf Karl Zahn, 1988.; Linus Pauling, 1988.; Ćiril Kos, 1989.; Živan Bezić, 1989.; Herman Northrop Frye, 1990.; Alois Mock, 1993.; Johann G. Reissmüller, 1995.; Paško Rakić, 1997.; Süleyman Demirel, 1997.; Egon Matijević, 1998.; William J. Perry, 1998.; Margaret Thatcher, 1998.; Kathleen Vaughan Wilkes, 2001.; Robert Badinter, 2003.; Jacques Friedel, 2008.; Albert Fert, 2008.; Branko Lustig, 2009.; Stanko Lasić, 2015.; Dragan Čović, 2018.; Daniel Hagège, 2018.

=== Rector's award ===
The Rector's award (Rektorova nagrada) is awarded as part of the University of Zagreb Week (Tjedan Sveučilišta u Zagrebu) in November. The award committee consists of two professors from each of the seven scientific fields covered by the University.

== Gallery ==
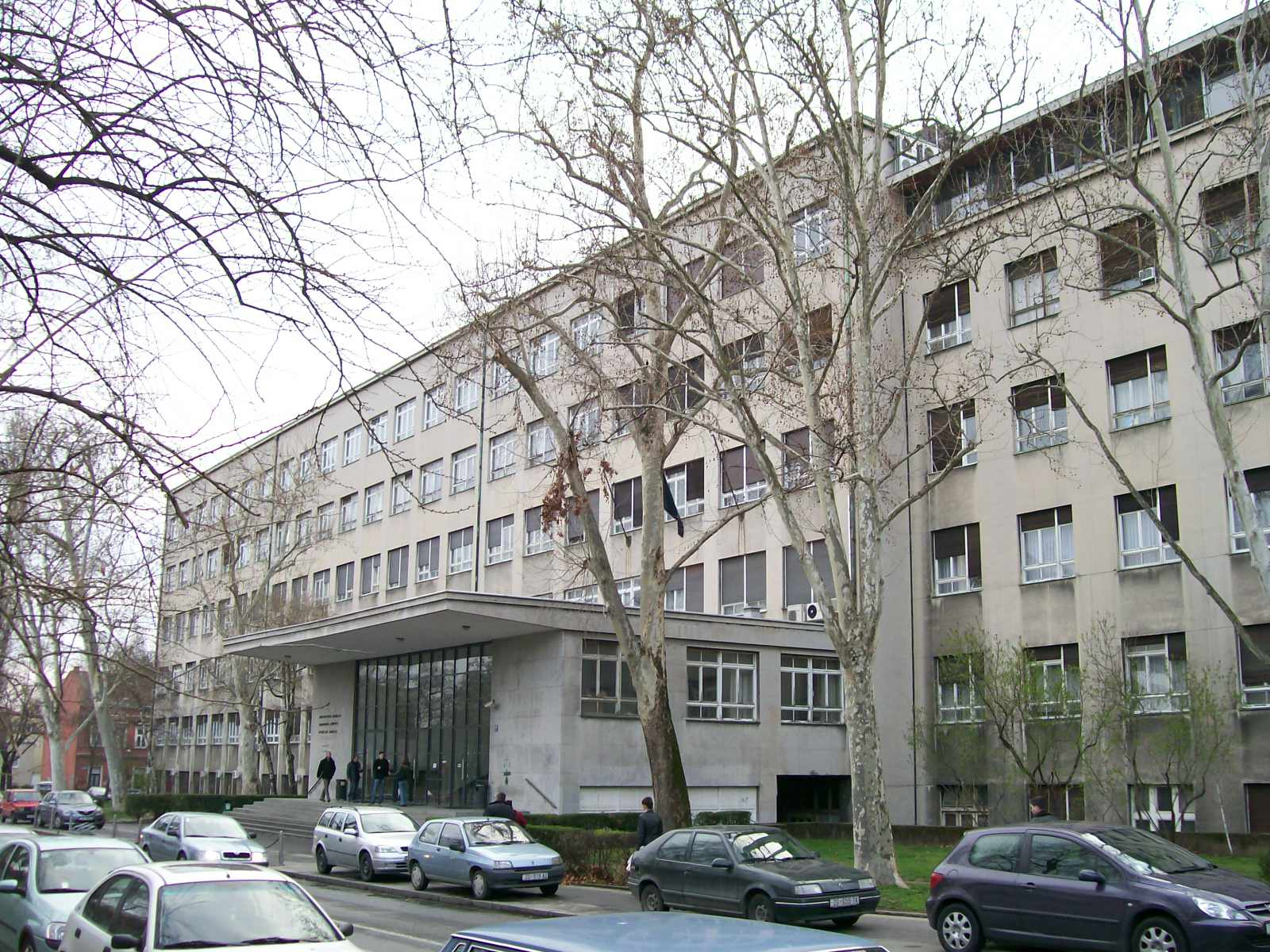
Faculty of Architecture

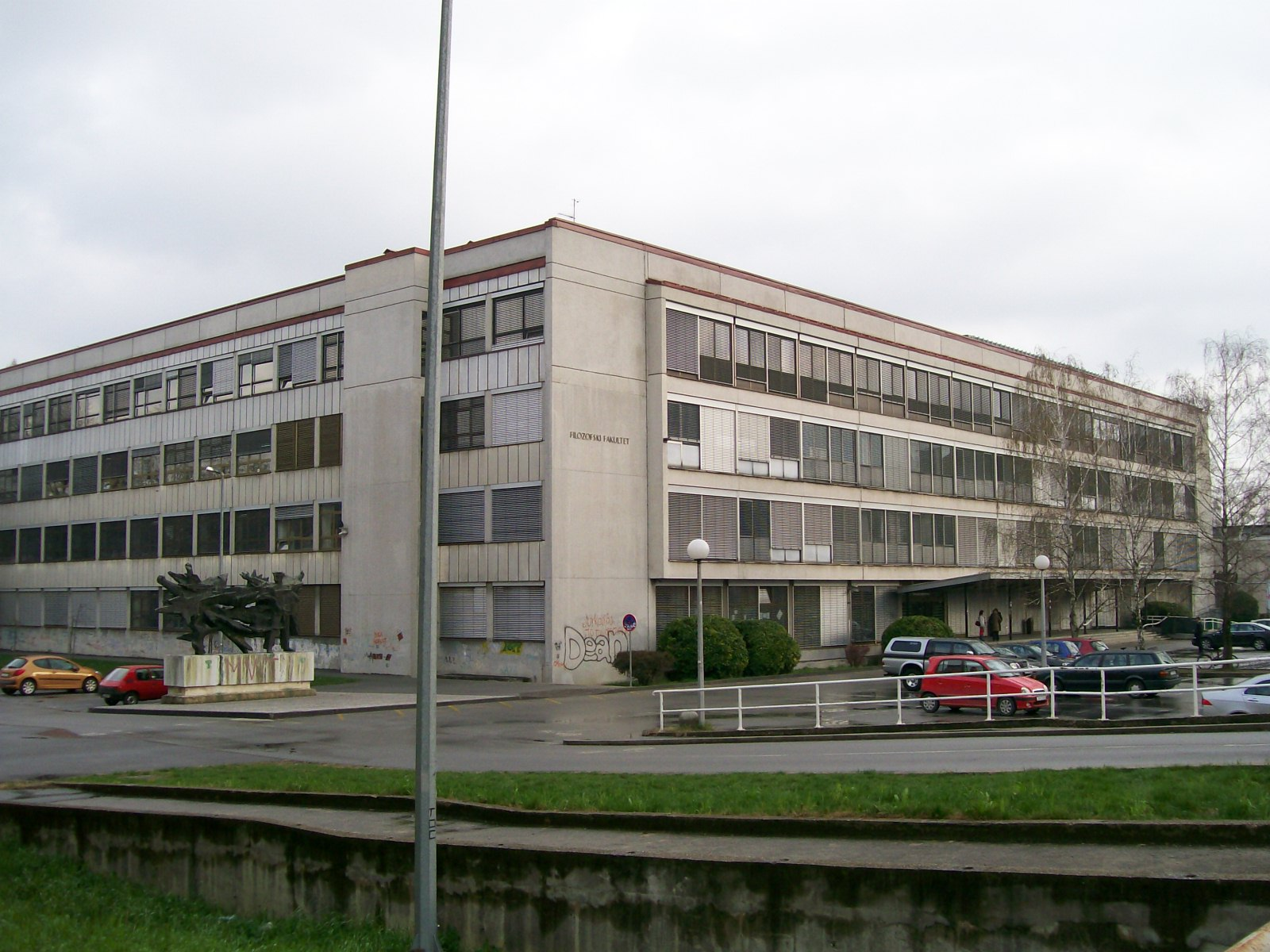
Faculty of Humanities and Social Sciences

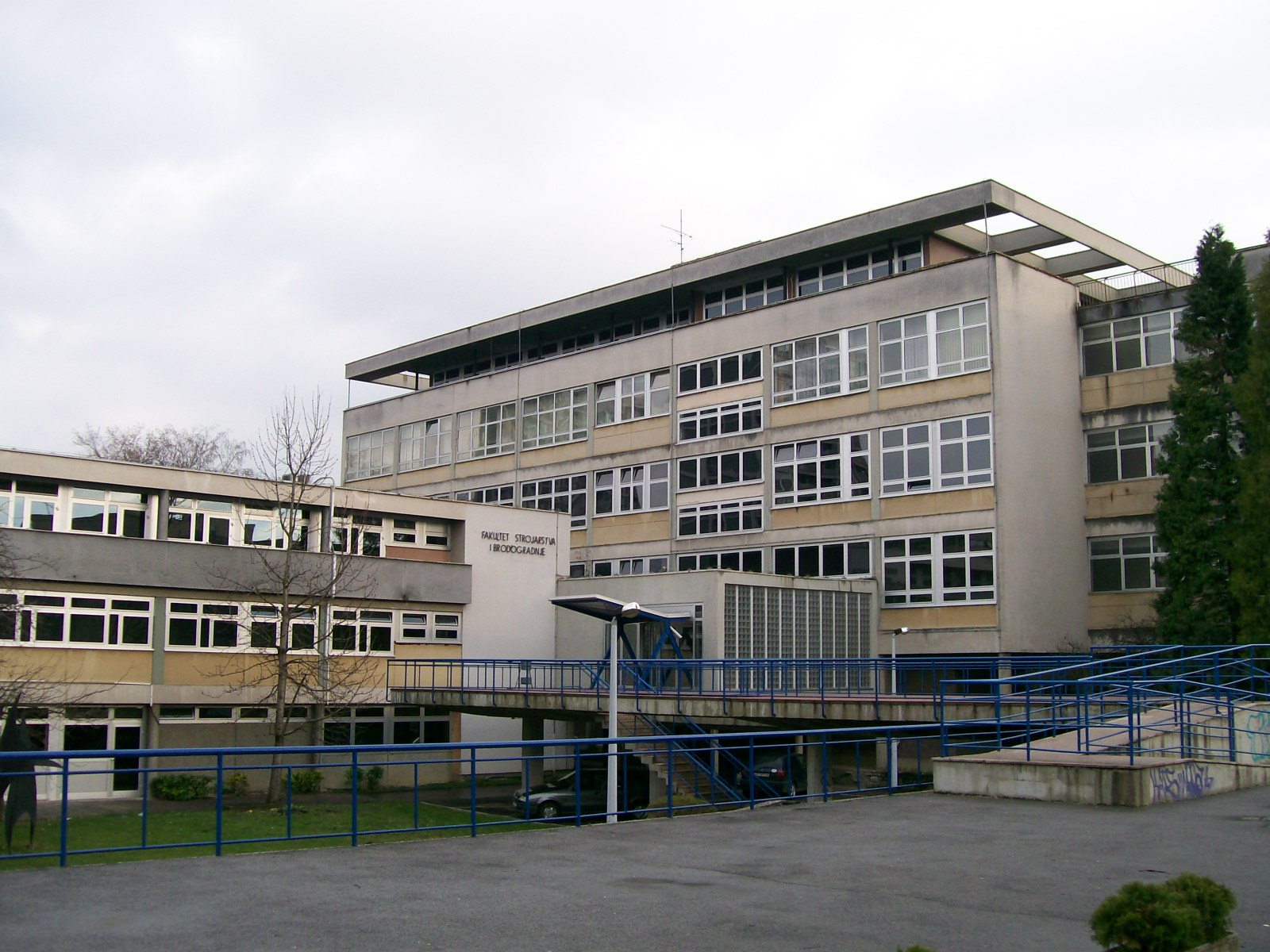
Faculty of Mechanical Engineering and Naval Architecture

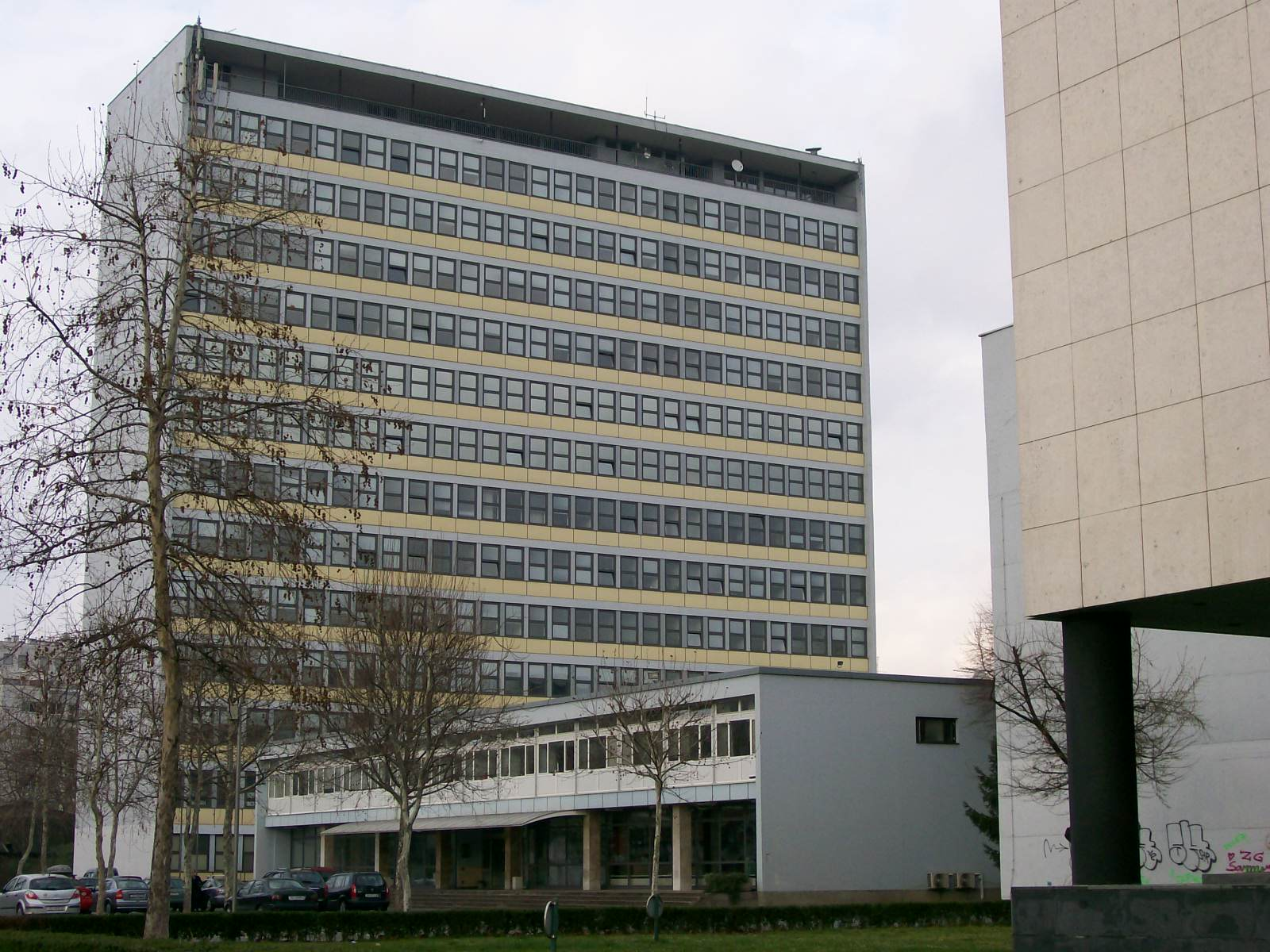
Faculty of Electrical Engineering and Computing

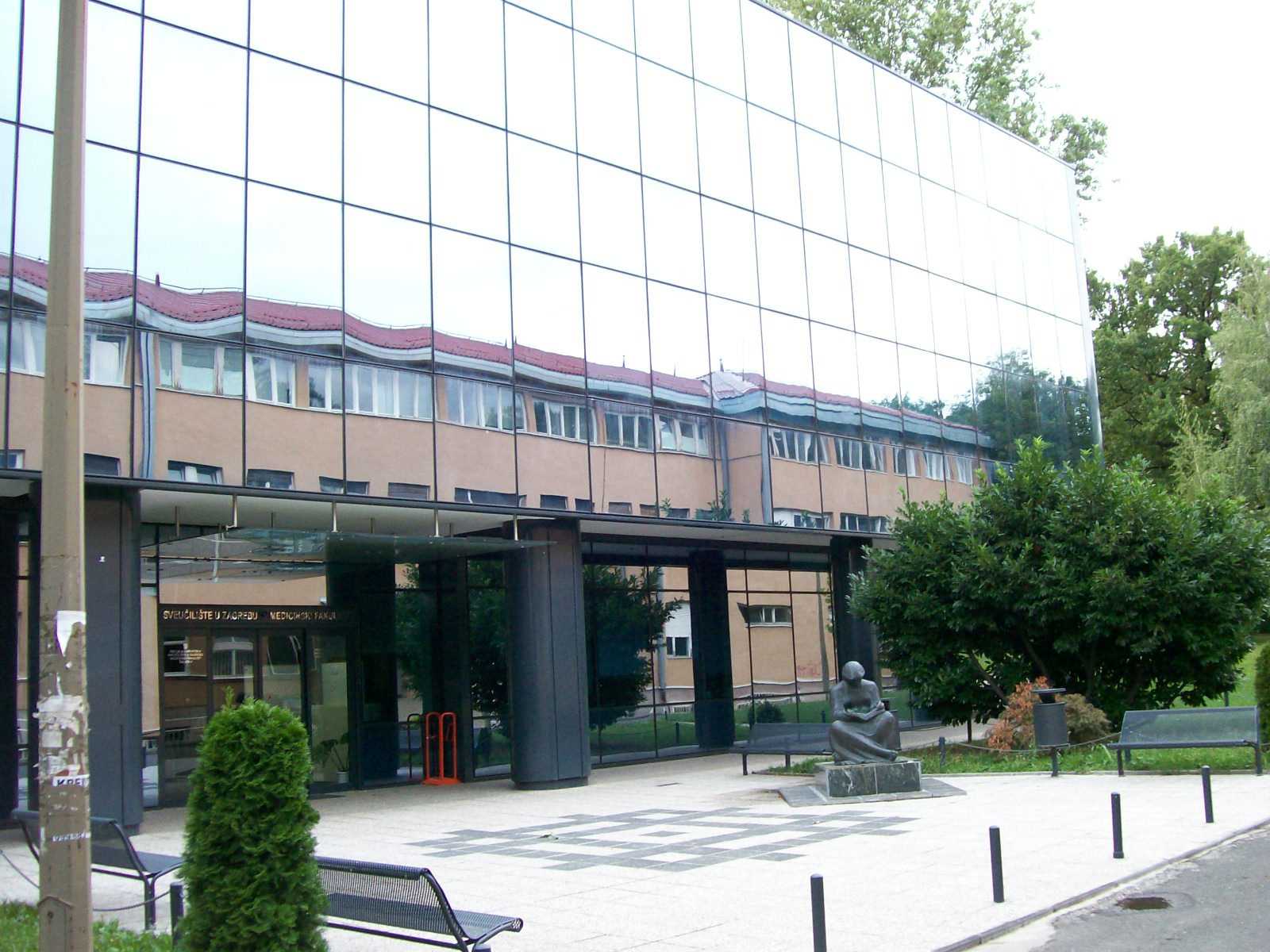
School of Medicine

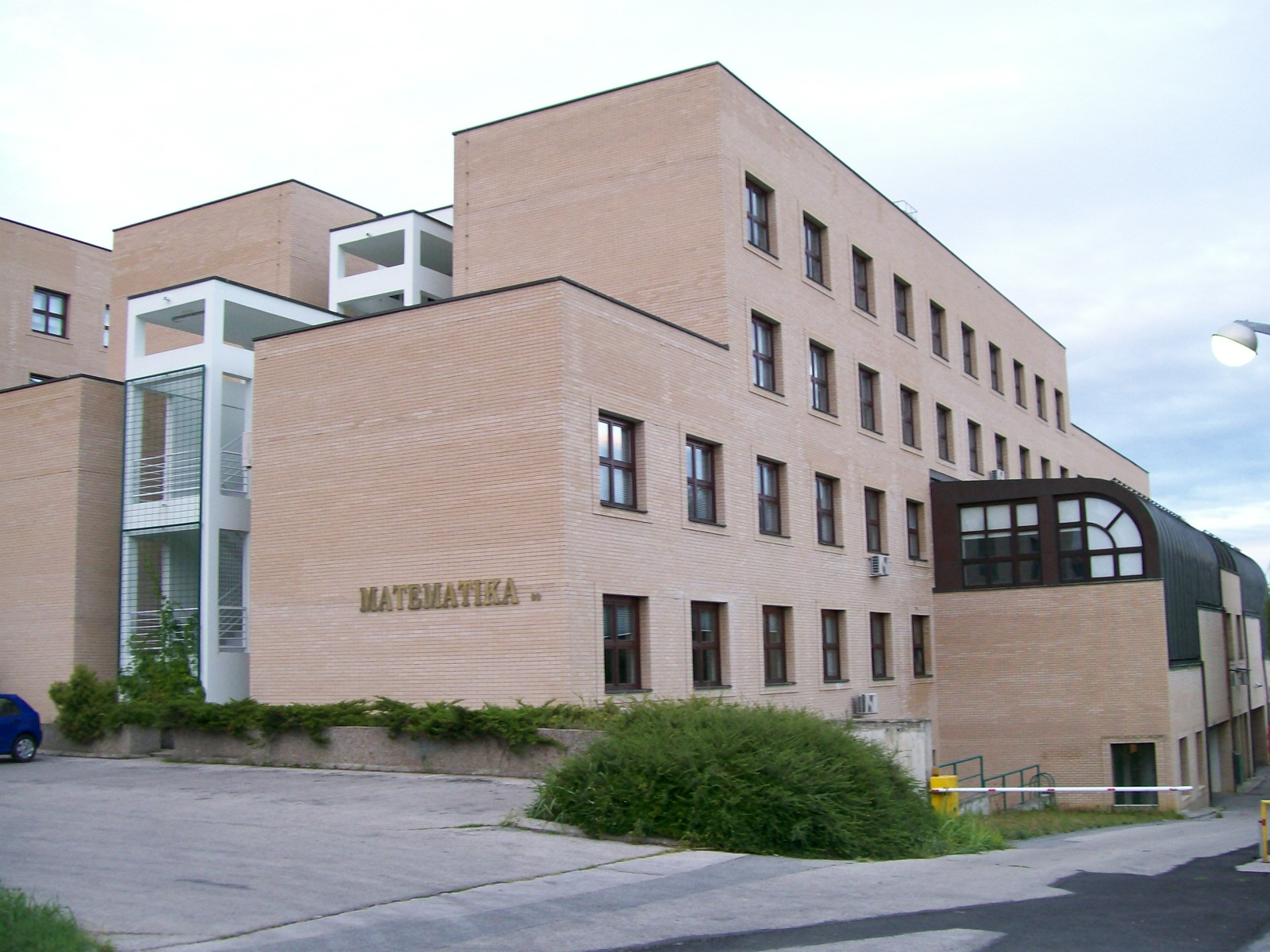
Faculty of Science, Department of Mathematics

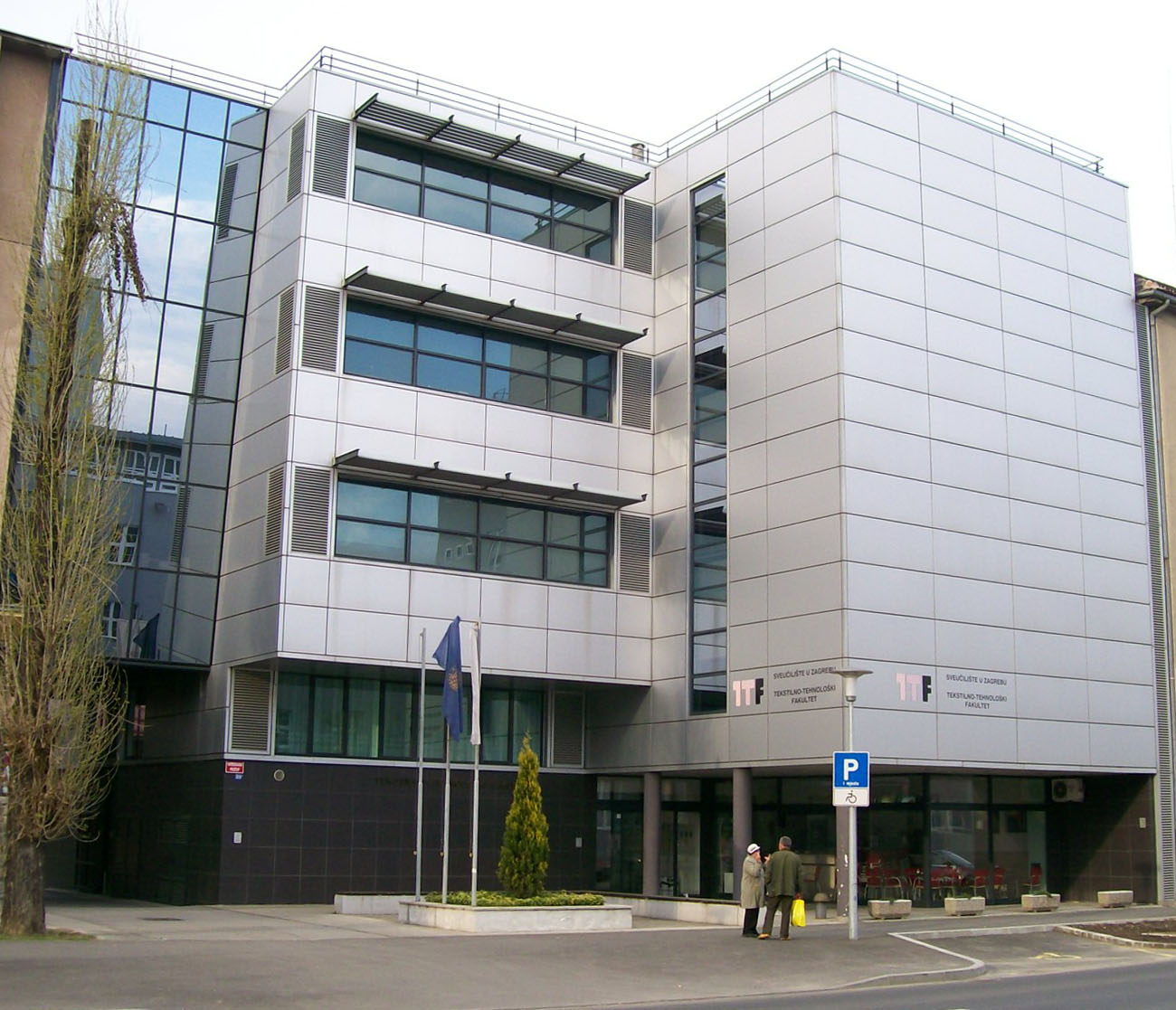
Faculty of Textile Technology

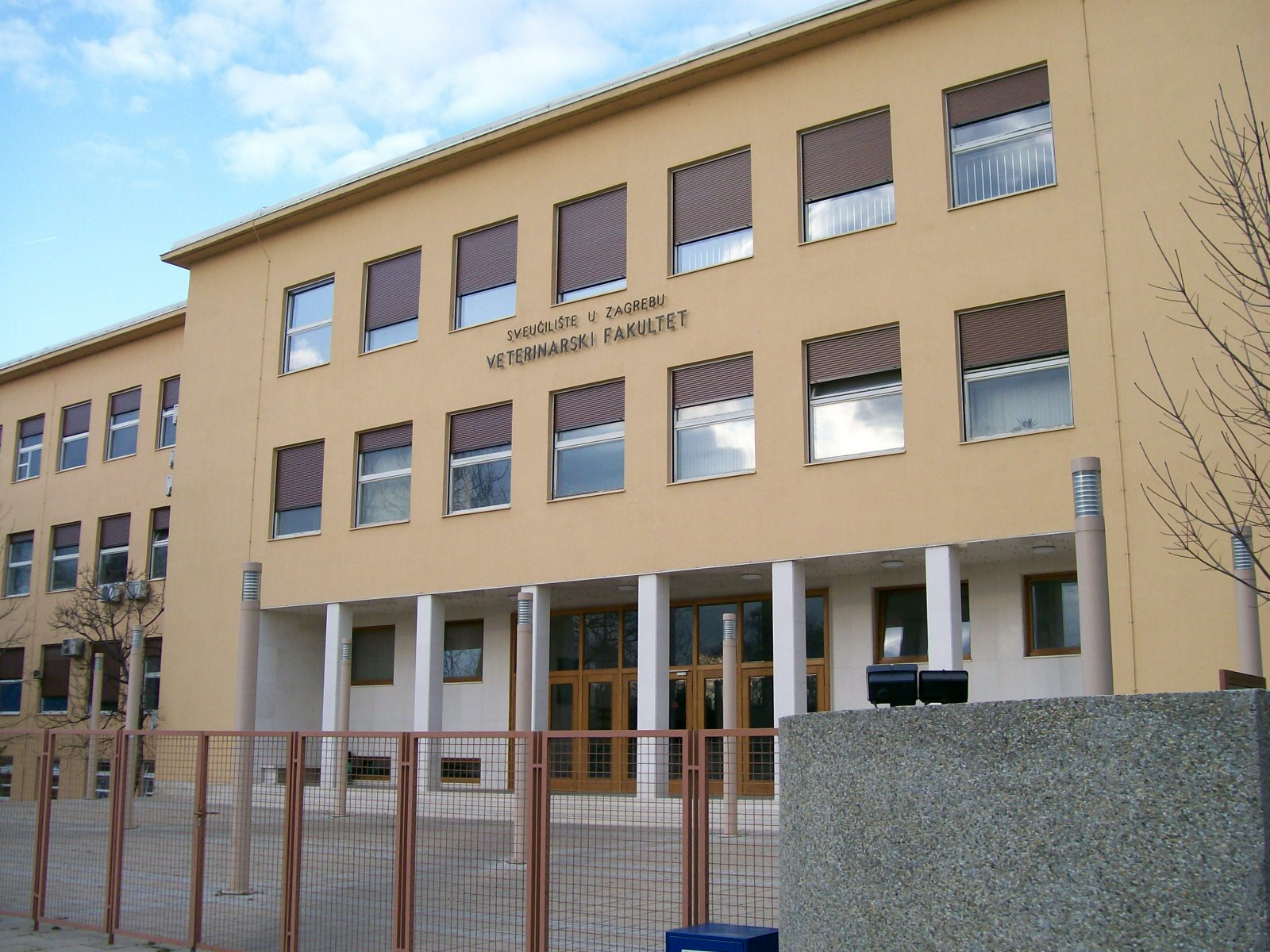
Faculty of Veterinary Medicine

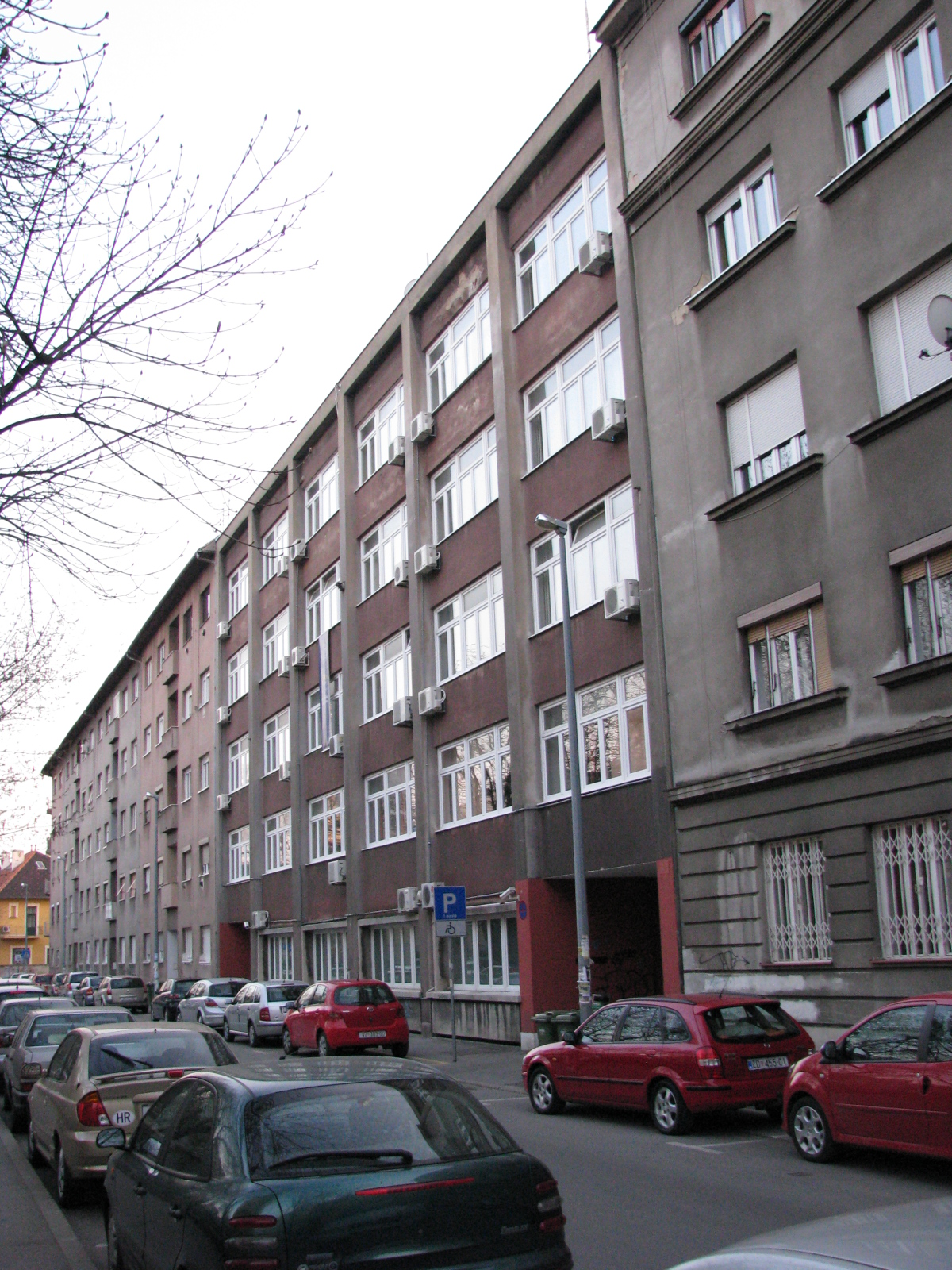
Faculty of Political Science

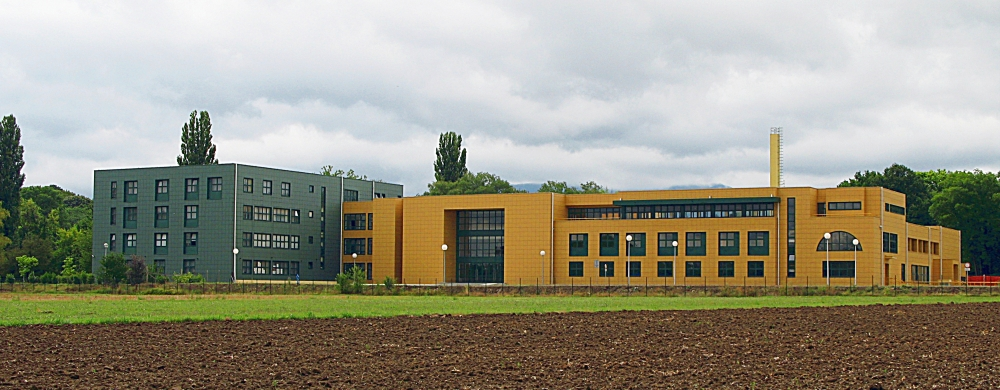
Faculty of Forestry

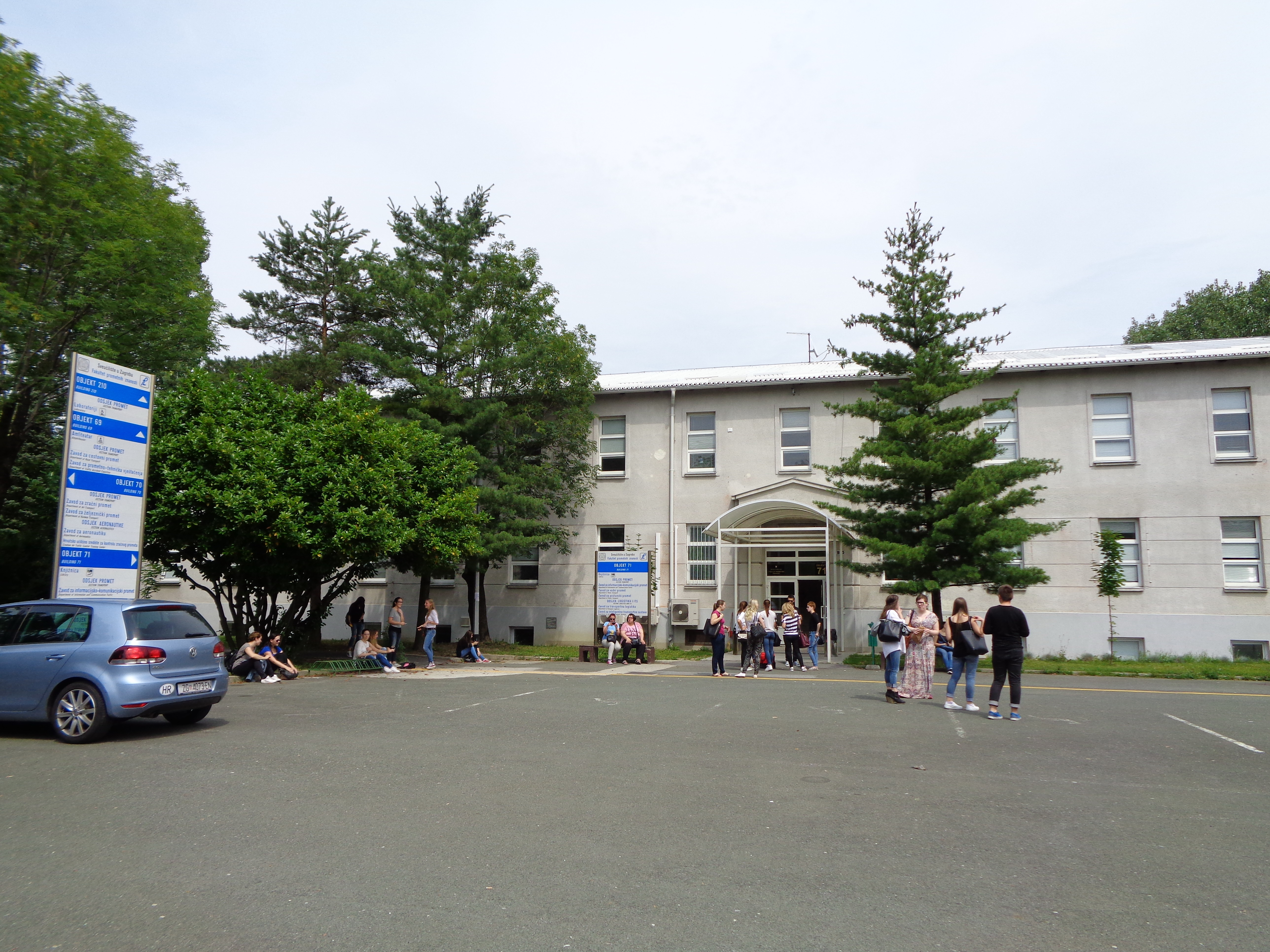
Faculty of Transport and Traffic Sciences

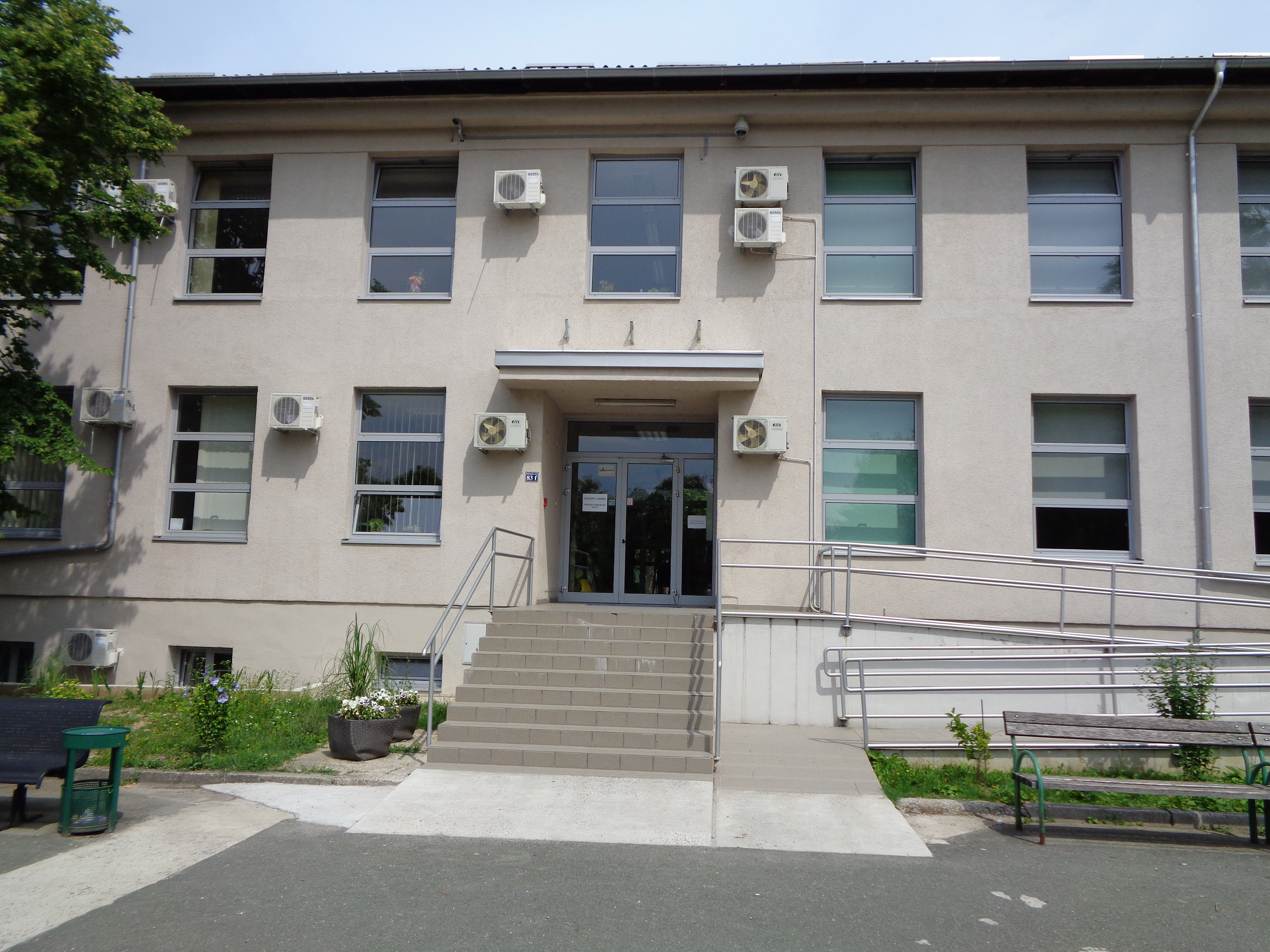
Faculty of Special Education and Rehabilitation

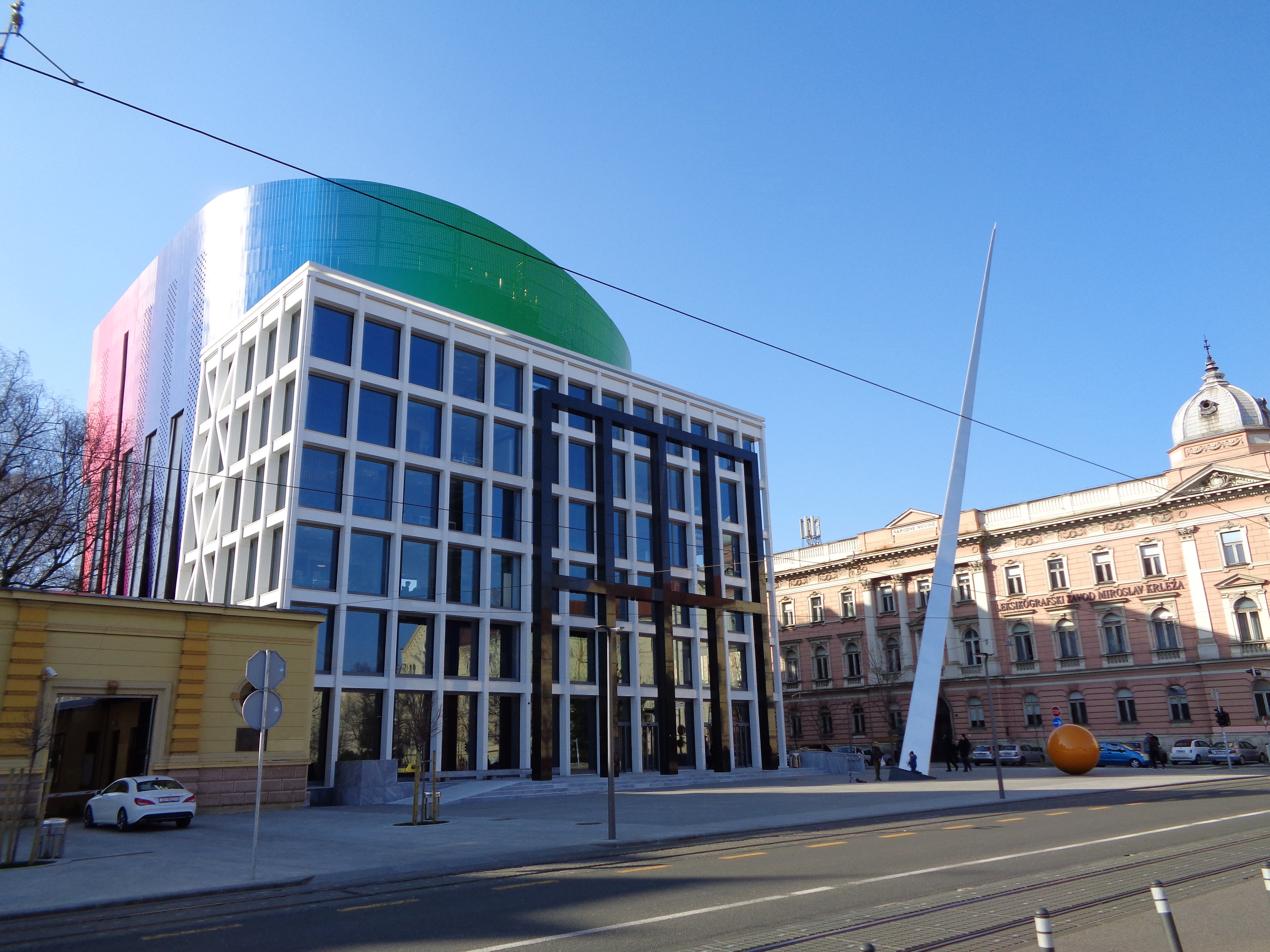
Academy of Music

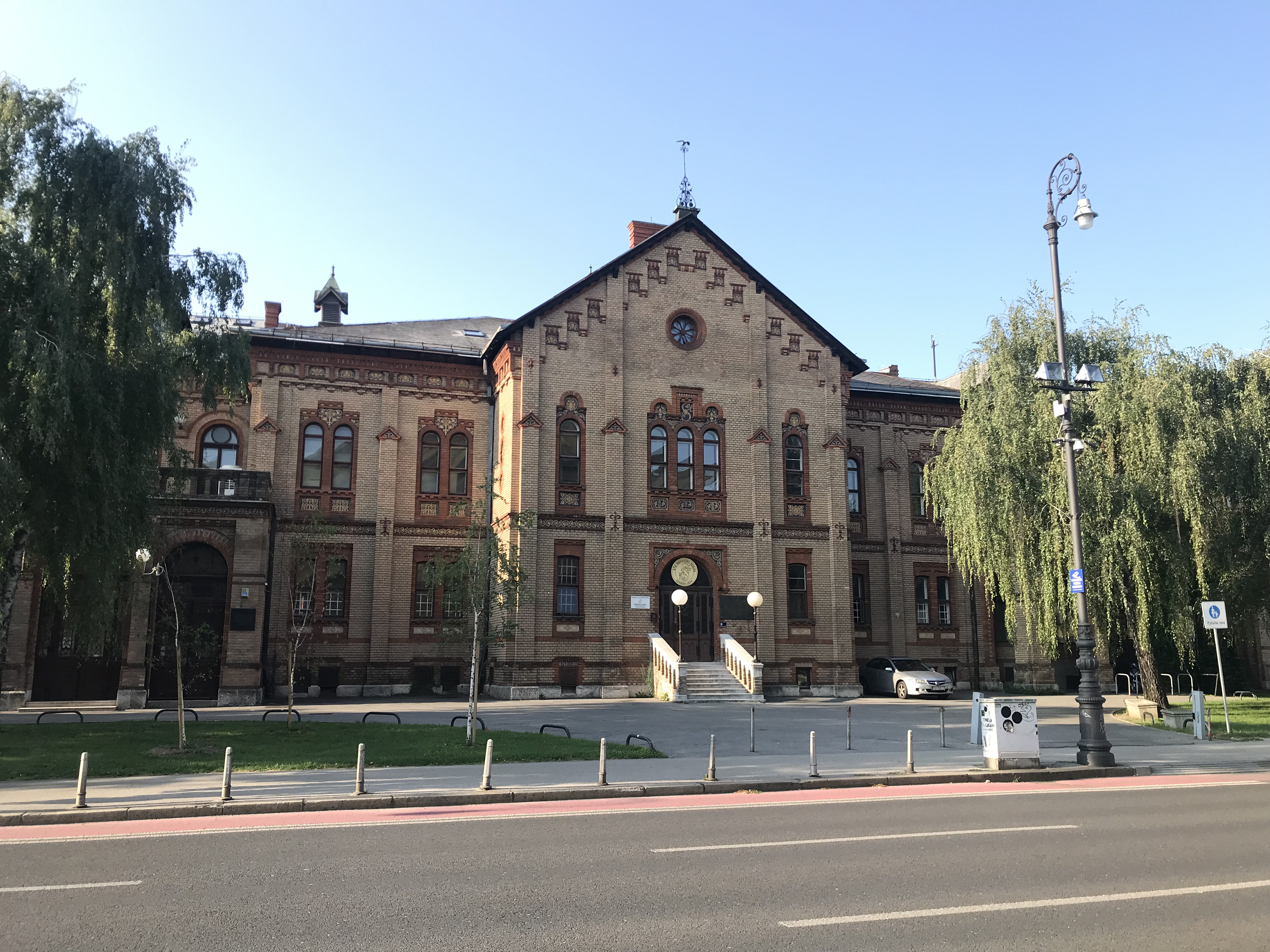
Academy of Dramatic Arts

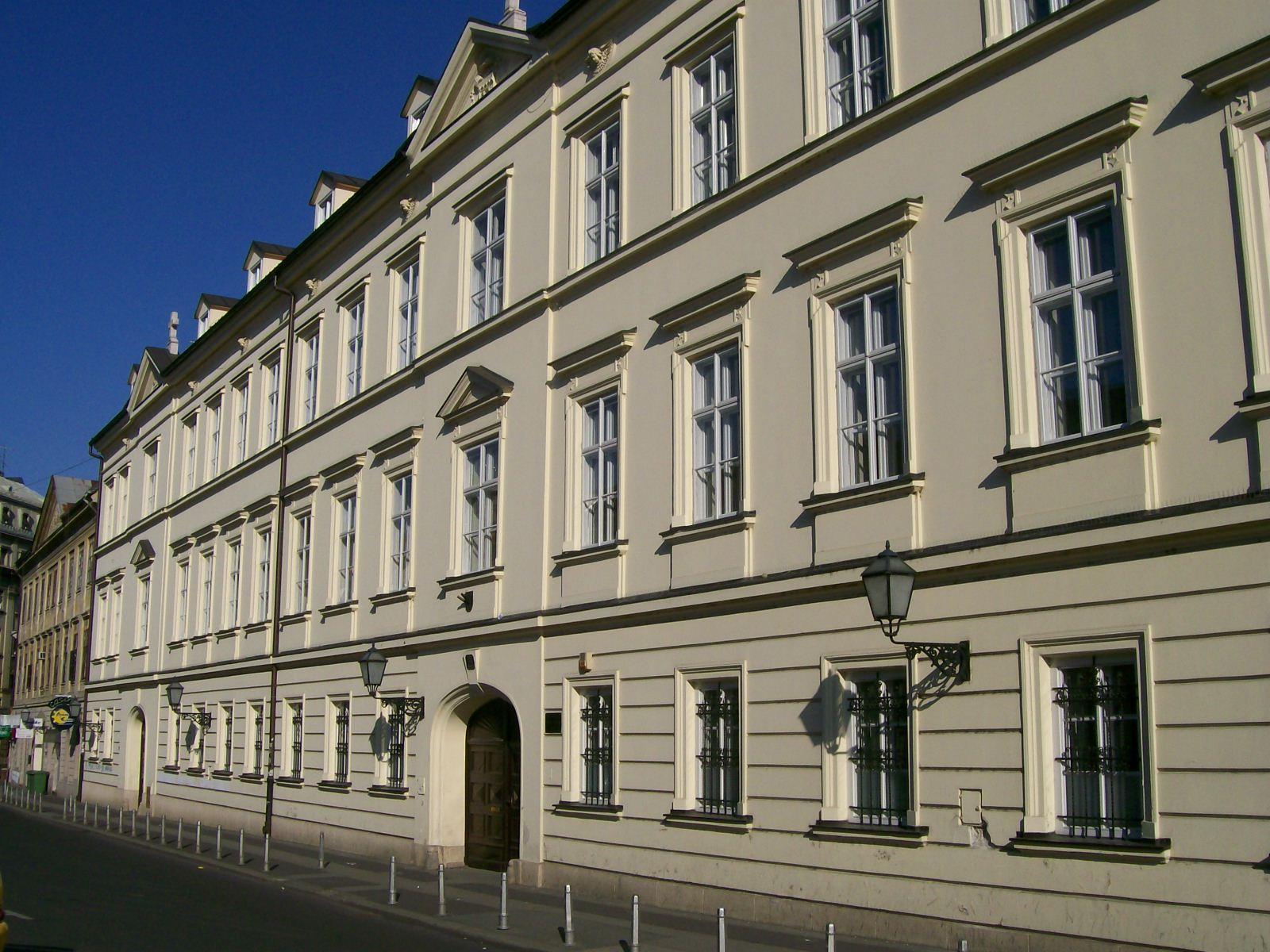
Catholic Faculty of Theology

== See also ==
- List of modern universities in Europe (1801–1945)
- List of universities in Croatia
- National and University Library Zagreb
