= Stjepan Matičević =

Croatian philosopher and pedagogue (1880–1940)

Stjepan Matičević (19 December 1880 - 16 June 1940) was a Croatian pedagogue, philosopher, university professor and academic.

== Biography ==
Stjepan Matičević was born in Gradishte, near Kutjeva, Croatia. After primary and secondary education, he studied philosophy in Zagreb and Vienna, where he obtained his doctorate. For study purposes, he also stayed in Leipzig and Jena. Among other things, he was a professor at the pedagogical high school, then at the Faculty of Philosophy in Zagreb, where he taught theoretical pedagogy and philosophy. He was the founder of the Pedagogical Institute in Zagreb (1936). He is committed to the autonomy of pedagogy, but linked to axiology and psychology. He was a representative of functionalist and personalist pedagogy and against the working schools. According to him, all human functions develop in a harmonious way, with the aim of the full development of the cultured man, namely the achievement of the ideal of humanity. He wrote and published a number of works.

== Publications ==
- "Zur Grundlegung der Logik", 1909;
- "Nauk o didaktičkoj artikulaciji i novija psihologija mišljenja", 1921;
- "Osnovi nove škole", 1934;
- "Priroda, kultura i odgoj", 1935;
- "Uvod u pedagogiju", 1936;
- "Uzgoj, škola i učitelj u novoj pedagogiji", 1938;
- "Personalistička pedagogija", 1991.
