= Vatroslav Jagić =

Croatian Slavist (1838–1923)

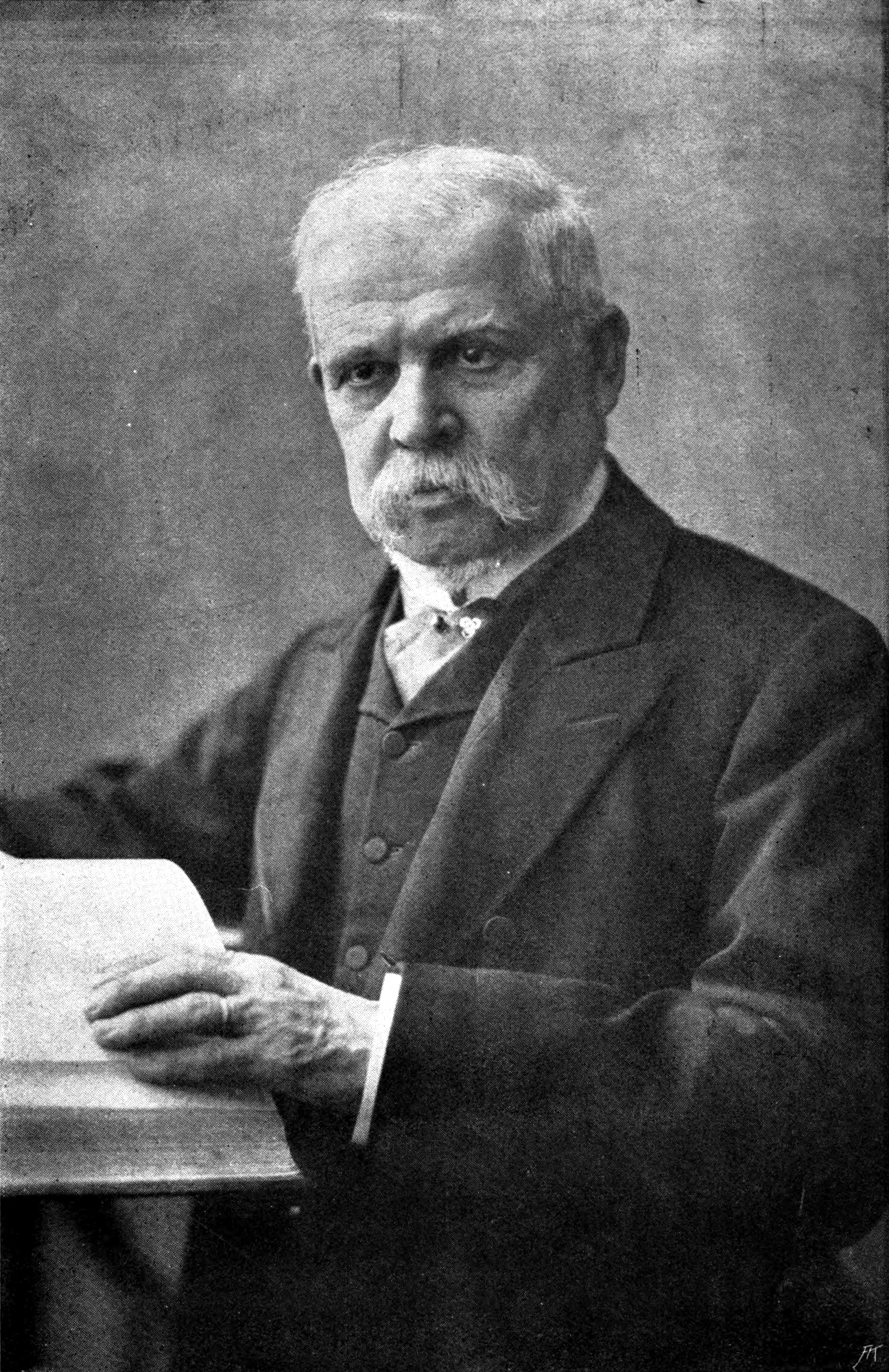
- Vatroslav Jagić in 1918
- Born: 6 July 1838; Varaždin, Croatia, Austrian Empire (modern Croatia)
- Died: 5 August 1923 (aged 85); Vienna, Austria
- Education: University of Vienna
- Scientific career
- Fields: Philologist-slavist, linguist, paleographer
- Workplaces: University of Vienna; Odessa University (Novorossiysk University); Saint Petersburg State University; Humboldt University of Berlin
- Doctoral advisor: Franz Miklosich
- Doctoral students: Ivan Franko
- Other notable students: Aleksander Brückner

Vatroslav Jagić (Note: Jagić's original given name was Latin Ignatius, Croatian Ignac. During his education at Zagreb Gymnasium he adapted it into Vatroslav, in accordance with the Illyrian practice of Croatisation. When publishing in Russian he used an adapted form: Игнатий Викентьевич Ягич (romanised: Ignaty Vikentyevich Yagich; pre-reform spelling: Игнатій Викентьевичъ Ягичъ).) (Serbo-Croatian pronunciation: [ʋâtroslaʋ jǎːɡit͡ɕ]; 6 July 1838 – 5 August 1923) was a Croatian scholar of Slavic studies in the second half of the 19th century.

== Life ==
Jagić was born in Varaždin to Vinko, a shoemaker, and Ana Jagić née Kraljek. In his hometown he attended the elementary school and started his secondary-school education. He finished that level of education at the Classical Gymnasium in Zagreb. Having a particular interest in philology, he moved to Vienna, where he was lectured in Slavic studies under the guidance of Franz Miklosich. He continued his studies and defended his doctoral dissertation Das Leben der Wurzel dê in den slavischen Sprachen [The Life of the Root dê in Slavic Languages] in Leipzig (Germany) in 1871.

Upon finishing his studies, Jagić returned to Zagreb, where from 1860 to 1870 he worked as a professor at the Zagreb Gymnasium. In 1862 he married Sidonija Struppi, with whom he had three children. His daughter Stanka married the philologist Milan Rešetar.

In 1869, Jagić was elected a full member of the Yugoslav Academy of Sciences and Arts, and a correspondent member of the Russian Academy of Sciences in Saint Petersburg. Next year, 1871, he became a professor of Slavic studies at Odessa University (Novorossiysk University) and worked also in Berlin, where he moved in 1874 to become the very first professor of Slavic studies at the prestigious Friedrich Wilhelm University of Berlin. Jagić held this post until 1880, when he moved again and became teacher at the University of St Petersburg.

In 1886, he returned to Vienna, where at the University of Vienna he replaced the retiring Miklosich. There he taught until his own retirement in 1908, but continued research and publishing afterwards. In his final years, after the First World War, he had financial difficulties and was forced to sell his book collection. At the time, he wrote his autobiography Spomeni mojega života [Memories of My Life], which was posthumously published by the Serbian Royal Academy in two volumes, in 1930 and 1934, edited by Milan Rešetar.

Jagić died in Vienna and was laid to rest in his native Varaždin.

== Works ==
Works on literature and language written by Jagić started to be published for the first time in the reports of the high school where he worked. In 1863, with his fellow researchers Josip Torbar and Franjo Rački he launched the journal Književnik. In this journal, he published a number of articles regarding the problems of the grammar, syntax, orthography, and history of the language used by Croats. His works were noticed within the Yugoslav Academy of Sciences and Arts (JAZU), founded in Croatia in 1866. His works were mainly related to verbs, paleography, vocalization of the language, folk poetry, and its sources. He polemicised against the Rijeka Philological School through negative reviews of Fran Kurelac's books Recimo koju [Let's Say a Few Words] (1860) and Fluminensia (1862), and especially against the dominant Zagreb Philological School, represented by Adolfo Veber Tkalčević and Bogoslav Šulek, regarding the problems of orthography and pronunciation (Naš pravopis [Our Orthography], 1864). Although earlier he had held the opposite stance (Quomodo scribamus nos? [How Should We Write?], 1859), in the 1864 article he criticised Zagreb School's usage of the -ah ending in the genitive plural form of nouns, as it lacked basis in the history of language, instead arguing for the -â ending, in line with the norm espoused by Vuk Karadžić and his followers; he also argued for introducing moderate elements of phonemic orthography to the otherwise morphological and etymological norm of the Zagreb School. In his arguments he introduced the methods of comparative linguistics in Croatia, and their influence paved the way for the Vukovian standard prevailing over Zagreb School's. However, in the following decades he also criticised Vukovian scholarship (Maretić's 1899 grammar, and Broz's and Iveković's 1901 dictionary, among others).

He prepared many critical editions of premodern texts, mainly Croatian and Old Church Slavonic. He was among the founders of the Stari pisci hrvatski [Old Croatian Writers] series published by JAZU, which focused on publishing Croatian literature from the Renaissance to the era of the Illyrian movement, beginning with an edition of the works of Marko Marulić (1869, co-edited by Jagić and Ivan Kukuljević Sakcinski). For the series Jagić also edited the works of Šiško Menčetić and Džore Držić (1870), Mavro Vetranović (1871-1872, co-edited with Ivan August Kaznačić and Đuro Daničić), and Nikola Dimitrović and Nikola Nalješković (1872, co-edited with Daničić). Elsewhere he published critical editions of medieval Croatian texts, Glagolitic Old Church Slavonic texts such as Codex Zographensis (1879), Codex Marianus (1883), Kiev Missal and Fragmenta Vindobonensia (1890), and others.

In Berlin, he started publishing the Archiv für slavische Philologie (Archive for Slavic Philology) in 1875, which he kept editing for 45 years. The periodical focused the attention of scholars and the general public on the Slavs, increasing their interest in Slavic languages and their culture. It also affirmed the importance of Slavic studies, its methodology, and its validity as a scholarly discipline.

While in Vienna, he developed the idea to organise the publication of a multi-volume encyclopedia of Slavic philology, which began to be realised a decade later in Peterburg. The first volume was Jagić's own Istorija slavjanskoj filologii [History of Slavic philology], published in 1910, which meticulously described the development of Slavic studies from the beginnings to the end of the 19th century. The following volumes were written by Aleksey Shakhmatov, Stepan Kulbakin, Olaf Broch, and others, but the extensive project was never completed.

In his work on Old Church Slavic he concluded and proved that the language did not originate in the central plains of Pannonia, as it was previously claimed by Jernej Kopitar and Franz Miklošič, but in southern Macedonia. In his later years he also studied the life and works of Juraj Križanić (1618–1683), a Dominican priest that had shown considerable interest in Pan-Slavism and cooperation between Catholicism and Orthodoxy.

Jagić's work is regarded as impressive in scope and quality: Croatian linguist Josip Hamm remarked that Jagić's collected works would, put together, number more than 100 volumes of large format, and considers his work to have brought Slavic studies onto an equal footing with the other major philological branches. Serbian linguist Aleksandar Belić praised Jagić's style and clarity, as well as the breadth of his scholarly interests.

Among his most famous students were the Norwegian slavist Olaf Broch, Polish slavist Aleksander Brückner and the Ukrainian poet and scholar Ivan Franko.

== Selected bibliography ==
=== Books ===
- Gramatika jezika hèrvatskoga: osnovana na starobugarskoj slovenštini. Dio pèrvi: Glasovi [Grammar of the Croatian Language: Based on Old Church Slavonic. Part One: Sounds] (1864). Zagreb: Brzotiskom Antuna Jakića (NSK, Google Books = Internet Archive = Wikimedia)
- Das Leben der Wurzel dê in den slavischen Sprachen [The Life of the Root dê in Slavic Languages] (1871). Wien: Comissionverlag von Carl Gerold’s Sohn. (FOI, Münchener DigitalisierungsZentrum)
- Historija književnosti naroda hrvatskoga i srbskoga. Knjiga prva: Staro doba [History of the Literature of Croatian and Serbian People. Volume 1: The Older Period] (1867). Zagreb: Štamparija Dragutina Albrechta. (Münchener DigitalisierungsZentrum)
  - Russian edition: Исторія сербско-хорватской литературы (древній періодъ) (1871). Казань. (Internet Archive)
- Лекціи по исторической грамматикѣ русскаго языка [Lessons on the Historical Grammar of Russian Language] (1884). Петербургъ: Литогр. Гробовой. (Internet Archive, DSpace Репозиторий)
- Вопросъ о Кириллѣ и Меѳодіи въ славянской филологіи [The Problem of Cyril and Methodius in Slavic Philology] (1885). Санктпетербургъ: Типографія Императорской Академіи наукъ. (Национальная электронная библиотека)
- Четыре критико-палеографическія статьи [Four Critical-Palaeographic Articles] (1885). Санктпетербургъ: Типографія Императорской Академіи наукъ. (DSpace Репозиторий)
- Критическія замѣтки по исторіи русскаго языка [Critical Notes on the History of Russian Language] (1889). Санктпетербургъ: Типографія Императорской Академіи наукъ. (Национальная электронная библиотека, Internet Archive)
- Die Menandersentenzen in der altkirchenslavischen Übersetzung [Menander's proverbs in Old Church Slavonic Translation] (1892). Wien: F. Tempsky. (Münchener DigitalisierungsZentrum)
- Ruska književnost u osamnaestom stoljeću [Russian Literature in the Eighteenth Century] (1895). Slike iz svjetske književnosti. Svezak treći. Zagreb: Matica hrvatska. (Internet Archive)
- Разсужденія южно-славянской и русской старины о церковно-славянскомъ языкѣ = Codex slovenicus rerum grammaticarum [South Slavic and Russian Antiquity's Considerations on Church Slavonic Language] (1895), in: Изслѣдованія по русскому языку: Томъ I. Санктпетербургъ: Типографія Императорской Академіи наукъ. (Internet Archive) Also as separate book, 1896, С.-Петербургъ = Petropoli: Berolini, apud Weidmannos. (Münchener DigitalisierungsZentrum)
- Beiträge zur slavischen Syntax. Zur Analyse des einfachen Satzes: erste Hälfte [Contributions to Slavic Syntax. Towards the Analysis of the Simple Sentence: First Half] (1899). Wien: in Commission bei Carl Gerold's Sohn. (Internet Archive)
- А. С. Пушкинъ въ южно-славянскихъ литературахъ. Сборникъ библіографическихъ и литературно-критическихъ статей [A.S. Pushkin in South Slavic Literatures] (1901), with Ivan Shishmanov, Milivoj Šrepel and Ivan Prijatelj. Санктпетербургъ: Типографія Императорской Академіи наукъ. (Google Books)
- Исторія славянской филологіи [History of Slavic Philology] (1910). Энциклопедія славянской филологіи. Выпускъ 1. Санктпетербургъ: Типографія Императорской Академіи наукъ. (Национальная электронная библиотека)
- Графика у славянъ [Slavic Scripts] (1911), with Victor Gardthausen (В. Гардтгаузенъ). Энциклопедія славянской филологіи. Выпускъ 3. Санктпетербургъ: Типографія Императорской Академіи наукъ. (Национальная электронная библиотека, Internet Archive)
- Entstehungsgeschichte der kirchenslavischen Sprache [History of the Origin of Church Slavonic Language] (1913) "Neue berichtige und erweiterte Ausgabe". Berlin: Weidmannsche Buchhandlung. (Internet Archive)
- Život i rad Jurja Križanića [Life and Work of Juraj Križanić] (1917). Zagreb: JAZU. (DiZbi.HAZU)
- Спомени мојега живота: I део (1838-1880) / II део (1880-1923) [Memories of My Life, 2 vols.] (1930-1934). Београд: Српска краљевска академија. (Münchener DigitalisierungsZentrum: vol. 1, vol. 2)
- Izabrani kraći spisi [Selected Shorter Works] (1948). Edited and translated by Mihovil Kombol. Zagreb: Matica hrvatska.
- Korespondencija Vatroslava Jagića 1 [Correspondence of Vatroslav Jagić 1] (1953). Edited by Petar Skok. Zagreb: Jugoslavenska akademija znanosti i umjetnosti.
- Djela Vatroslava Jagića IV.: Članci iz „Književnika“ III. (1866). Historija književnosti naroda hrvatskoga ili srbskoga [Works of Vatroslav Jagić IV] (1953). Edited by Slavko Ježić. Zagreb: Jugoslavenska akademija znanosti i umjetnosti.
- Rasprave, članci i sjećanja [Treatises, Articles and Memories] (1963). Edited by Marin Franičević, translated by Mihovil Kombol. Pet stoljeća hrvatske književnosti. Knjiga 43. Zagreb: Matica hrvatska, Zora.
- Письма И. В. Ягича к русским ученым. 1865 – 1886 [Letters of I. V. Jagich to Russian Scholars. 1865 – 1886] (1963). Prepared by Georgy Petrovich Blok and T. I. Lysenko [Т. И. Лысенко], edited by Viktor Vinogradov and G. P. Blok. Москва - Ленинград: Издательство Академии наук СССР. (ЭБ Научное наследие России)
- Korespondencija Vatroslava Jagića 2: Pisma iz Rusije [Correspondence of Vatroslav Jagić 2: Letters from Russia] (1970). Edited by Josip Hamm. Zagreb: JAZU.
- Korespondencija Vatroslava Jagića 3: Pisma iz Rusije [Correspondence of Vatroslav Jagić 3: Letters from Russia] (1983). Edited by Josip Hamm. Zagreb: JAZU.
- with Nikola Andrić: Korespondencija 1890–1918 [Correspondence 1890–1918] (2009). Edited by Ivana Mandić Hekman. Zagreb: Ex libris.

=== Articles and book chapters ===
- Naš pravopis [Our Orthography] (1864). In: Književnik. Godina prva. pp. 1–34, 151–180. (Google Books)
- Trubaduri i najstariji hrvatski lirici [Troubadours and the Oldest Croatian Lyric Poets] (1869). In: "Rad" Jugoslavenske akademije znanosti i umjetnosti, knjiga IX. (Internet Archive)
- Russian Language and Slavic Languages (1899). In: Johnson's Universal Cyclopædia vol. VII, ed. Charles Kendall Adams, pp. 219–221, 560–564. New York: A. J. Johnson and Sons / D. Appleton & Company. (Internet Archive)
- Schmurlo, Evgenij [in Russian]; Jagić, Vatroslav (1911). "Über Caramans Werk Identità oder Considerazioni" [On Caraman's work Identità or Considerazioni]. Archiv für slavische Philologie (in German). 33: 99–110.
- "Tomko Marnavić als Fälscher des angeblich im J. 1222 geschriebenen glagolitischen Psalters" [Tomko Marnavić as the Forger of the Glagolitic Psalter Allegedly Written in 1222]. Archiv für slavische Philologie (in German). 33: 111–134. 1911.
- Hrvatska glagolska književnost [Croatian Glagolitic Literature] (1913). In: Branko Vodnik, Povijest hrvatske književnosti, knjiga 1. [History of Croatian Literature, vol. 1], pp. 9–64. Zagreb: Matica hrvatska. (NSK)
- Conversion of the Slavs (1923). In: The Cambridge Medieval History. Volume IV: The Eastern Roman Empire (717–1453), ed. J. R. Tanner, C. Previté-Orton, Z. N. Brooke, pp. 215–229. New York: The Macmillan Company. (Internet Archive)

=== Edited texts ===
- Quattuor evangeliorum codex glagoliticus olim Zographensis nunc Petropolitanus (1879). Berolini: Weidmann. (Internet Archive)
- Specimena linguae palaeoslovenicae (1882). Санктпетербургъ: Императорская Академія наукъ. (Internet Archive)
- Quattuor Evangeliorum versionis palaeoslovenicae Codex Marianus Glagoliticus (1883). Berlin: Weidmann. (Internet Archive)
- Slavorum carmina epica selecta (1892). Vindobonae: Seminarium slavicum Vindobonensis. (HathiTrust)

=== Complete bibliographies ===
Bibliographies of Jagić's works have been published in:

- Jagić-Festschrift = Zbornik u slavu Vatroslava Jagića (1908). Berlin: Weidmannsche Buchhandlung. Bibliography 1861–1907 by František Pastrnek. (Münchener DigitalisierungsZentrum)
- Spisi V. Jagića v zadnjih desetih letih, in: Časopis za slovenski jezik, književnost in zgodovino: 1. in 2. snopič I. letnika (1918). Ljubljana. Bibliography 1907–1918 by Milan Rešetar and Fran Ramovš. (dLib.si)
- Библиографија Јагићевих радова од 1907 год., in: Јужнословенски филолог: књига III (1922–1923). Београд. Bibliography 1907–1924 by Stepan Kulbakin. (DAIS)
- † Vatroslav Jagič, in: Ljubljanski zvon: XLIII. letnik, 9. številka (1923). Bibliography 1918—1923 by Rajko Nahtigal. (E-knjige Založbe UL)
- Izabrani kraći spisi (1948). Zagreb: Matica hrvatska. Bibliography 1857–1934 by Mihovil Kombol.
- Zbornik o Vatroslavu Jagiću: Knjiga II. (2007). Zagreb: Fakultet hrvatskih studija. Edited by Tihomil Maštrović. Bibliography 1857–1999 by Martina Ćavar, catalogue of Jagić's manuscript collection at National and University Library in Zagreb by Ivan Kosić. (Fakultet hrvatskih studija)
