= Armenia–Croatia relations =

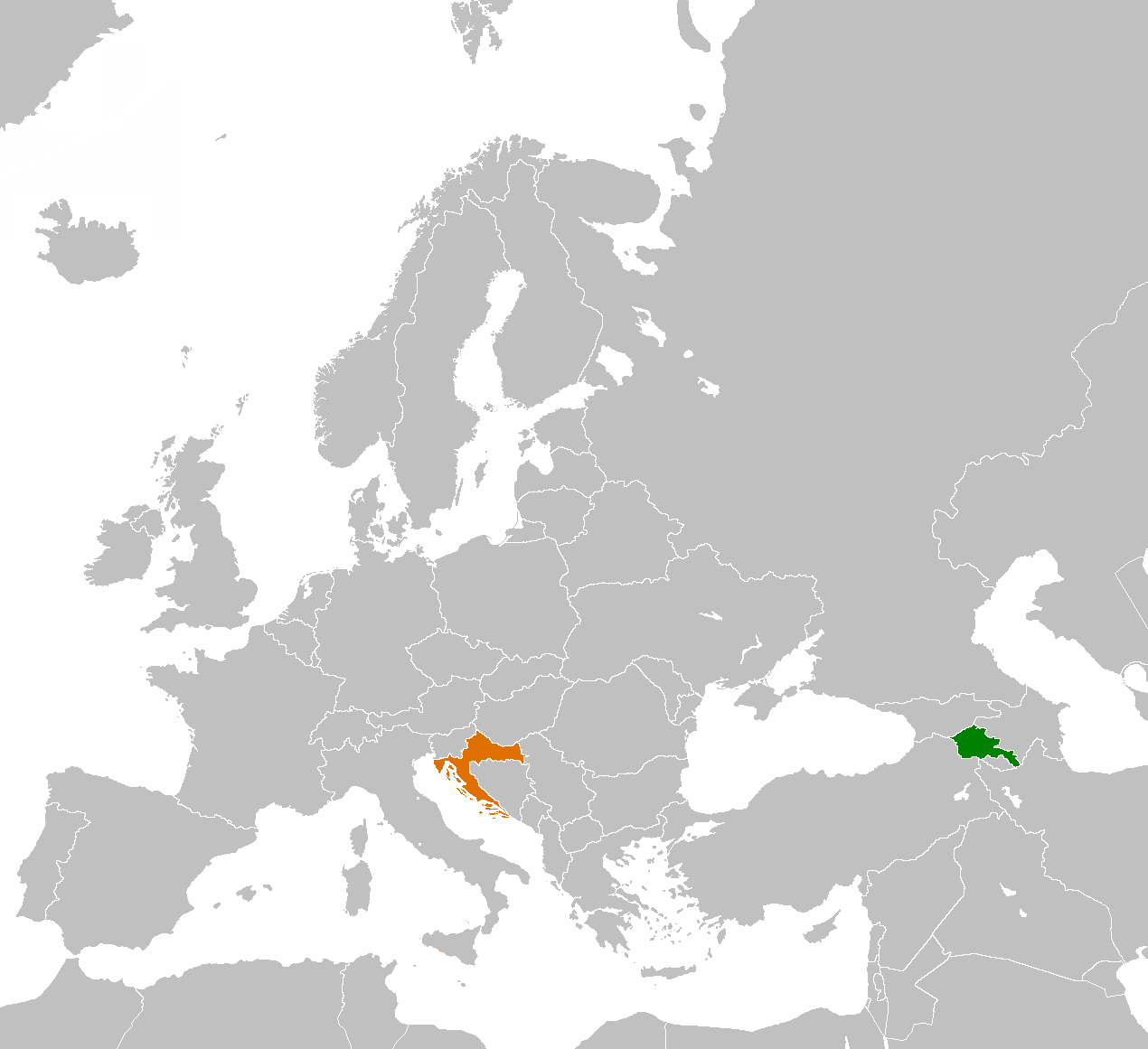

- Armenia: Croatia

Bilateral relations exist between Armenia and Croatia. Diplomatic relations between the countries were established on 8 July 1994. Armenia is represented in Croatia by its embassy in Rome, Italy, while Croatia is represented in Armenia by its embassy in Athens, Greece. In 2011, both countries have established honorary consulates, Armenia's residing in Zagreb, while Croatia's residing in Yerevan, the capitals of the respective countries.

Armenia is a signatory of the European Union Association Agreement. Both countries are members of the Council of Europe and the OSCE.

== History ==
Republic of Ragusa in present-day Dubrovnik was a center of Croatian-Armenian historical connections. Amongst many foreigners that inhabited Dubrovnik was a number of Armenians. Also, Ragusans celebrate Saint Blaise, a fourth century Armenian saint from Sivas as a patron-saint of their city. Also, other two patron saints of Dubrovnik, Zenobios and Zenobia, were Armenian saints from Cilicia, and Ragusans also observe a cult of the Forty Martyrs of Sebaste. Ragusan bishop Raimondo Gallani (Croatian: Rajmund Jelić) was archbishop of Ankara and apostolic Vicar of Istanbul at the beginning of the 18th century. Gallani corresponded with Mkhitar Sebastatsi, the founder of the well-known Mekhitarist Order. The Ragusans cared for Catholics in the Ottoman Empire, including those in Armenia.

A Croatian Jesuit from Perast, Father Josip Marinović, wrote Dissertazione polemico-critica sopra due dubbi di coscienza concernenti gli armeni cattolici, in 1783, at the request of a wealthy Armenian banker, Giovanni de Serpos. In the dissertation, Marinović defends Armenian Catholics in the Ottoman Empire who received the sacraments from the Monophysite Armenian Apostolic Church, which part of the clergy in Rome disapproved. Marinović wrote that Armenians had papal approval for performing rites in monophysite churches, as well as attending an Armenian rite mass, giving to charities, and observing holidays based on the Armenian calendar.

During a theological debate, Marinović wrote a three-volume work with more than 1,600 pages titled Compendino storico di memorie cronologiche concernenti la religione e la morale della nazione Armena, which was to be the first modern history of Armenians written in the West. In his work, Marinović wrote about Armenian geography, a review of the political and church history of Armenia, the history of their catholicoi and synods, and a review of Armenian customs and other political and religious matters.

Marinović's work influenced a final political and ecclesiastical solution to the problem of Armenian Catholics. With help from the Austrian and Russian Empire, the Vatican gained recognition of Armenian Catholics in the Ottoman Empire and founded their Archeparchy in Istanbul in 1830. Marinović's work laid a foundation for modern research of Armenian history.

Mekhitarists in Vienna, present-day Austria, published some 200 books in Croatian in the humanities and natural sciences. They also published a Croatian nationalist political journal Novi pozor between 1867 and 1869. Among notable Croatian authors whose books were published by the Michtarists in Vienna were Vjekoslav Babukić, Dimitrija Demeter, Juraj Haulik, Vjekoslav Klaić, Antun Mažuranić, Matija Mesić, Ilija Okrugić, Josip Juraj Strossmayer, Bogoslav Šulek, Josip Torbar and others.

=== Armenian genocide ===
Croats share deep sympathy with Armenians in the aftermath of the Armenian genocide even when Croatia has not recognized the genocide. It is noted that the genocide is carefully studied and distributed in Croatia.

== Representation ==
Armenia recognised Croatia as an independent country on 21 June 1994, while diplomatic relations between the countries were established on 8 July 1994. Armenia is represented in Croatia by its embassy in Rome, Italy Croatia is represented in Armenia by its embassy in Athens, Greece, Both countries have honorary consulates.

== Agreements ==
Armenia and Croatia have signed three agreements and one protocol:

Agreement	Signatories	Date of conclusion	Date of entry into force	Place
Protocol on cooperation between the Ministry of Foreign Affairs of the Republic of Croatia and the Ministry of Foreign Affairs of the Republic of Armenia	(Armenia) Vahan Papazian, Foreign Minister (Croatia) Mate Granić, Foreign Minister	14 September 1996	14 September 1996	Zagreb, Yerevan
Agreement between the Government of the Republic of Croatia and the Government of the Republic of Armenia on mutual abolishing of visa requirements for holders of diplomatic and service passports	(Armenia) Levon Ter-Petrosyan, President (Croatia) Franjo Tuđman, President	16 June 1997	25 December 1999	Zagreb, Yerevan
Agreement between the Republic of Croatia and the Republic of Armenia for the avoidance of double taxation and the prevention of fiscal evasion with respect to taxes on income	(Armenia) Serzh Sargsyan, President (Croatia) Stjepan Mesić, President	22 May 2009	-	Yerevan
Agreement between the Government of the Republic of Croatia and the Government of the Republic of Armenia on Co-operation in the Fields of Culture, Education and Science	(Armenia) Serzh Sargsyan, President (Croatia) Stjepan Mesić, President	22 May 2009	18 February 2010	Yerevan
Memorandum of Understanding between the Diplomatic Academy of the Ministry of Foreign and European Affairs of the Republic of Croatia and the Diplomatic School of the Ministry of Foreign Affairs of the Republic of Armenia on Cooperation in the Field of Diplomatic Training and Education	(Armenia) Ararat Mirzoyan, Foreign Minister (Croatia) Gordan Grlić-Radman, Foreign Minister	8 February 2023	8 February 2023	Yerevan
References: Ministry of Foreign Affairs of the Republic of Armenia; Ministry of Foreign and European Affairs of the Republic of Croatia

== Trade ==
Year	Armenia's export to Croatia (in thousands of $)	Croatia's export to Armenia (in thousands of $)
2019	254.8	732.5
2020	64.6	662.7
2021	173.6	965.4
2022	387.6	1,009.0
Reference: Ministry of Foreign Affairs of Armenia

== High level visits ==
Visits to Armenia			Visits to Croatia		
Date	Visitor	References	Date	Visitor	References
22 May 2009	Stjepan Mesić, Croatia's President		22–23 October 2003	Vartan Oskanian, Armenia's Foreign Minister	
20–21 March 2011	Luka Bebić, Croatia's Speaker of the Parliament		7–8 September 2009	Serzh Sargsyan, Armenia's President	
7–8 February 2023	Gordan Grlić-Radman, Croatia's Foreign Minister				

== Resident diplomatic missions ==
- Armenia is accredited to Croatia from its embassy in Prague, the Czech Republic.
- Croatia is accredited to Armenia from its embassy in Athens, Greece and an honorary consulate in Yerevan.

== See also ==
- Foreign relations of Armenia
- Foreign relations of Croatia
- Armenia-NATO relations
- Armenia-EU relations
  - Accession of Armenia to the EU
