= Ljudevit Jonke =

Croatian linguist

Ljudevit Jonke

Ljudevit Jonke (29 July 1907 – 15 March 1979) was a Croatian linguist.

== Life and work ==
Jonke was born in Karlovac, where he completed primary school and Karlovac Gymnasium. He graduated at the Faculty of Philosophy at the University of Zagreb the history of Yugoslav literatures, Croatian and Old Church Slavonic language and folk history with Russian and Latin. He spent two years (1930-1932) at the Charles University in Prague. Demonstrating the affiliation to literary and historical topics, he starts to translate from Czech. From 1933 he worked as a professor at the gymnasium in Sušak, and in 1940 he relocated to Zagreb, where professor Stjepan Ivšić chose him as an assistant in 1942. He was married to Nada Marković in 1940 with whom he had a daughter Dubravka and son Mladen (1944).

Simultaneously engaging himself in the topics of Croatian and Czech studies, he received his Ph.D. with a thesis Dikcionar Karlovčanina Adama Patačića (Rad JAZU #274). From autumn 1945 he taught Czech language and literature, and from autumn 1949 modern Croatian at the newly established department which he was a head from 1950, when he acquired the status of docent, up until the retirement in 1973. He became a regular professor in 1960.

In the 1950s, Jonke engaged in systematic study of a completely neglected subject of problems of Croatian from the Illyrian times to the end of 19th century (Borbe oko književnog oblika imeničkog genitiva množine u 19. stoljeću, 1957.; Osnovni problemi hrvatskoga književnog jezika u 19. stoljeću, 1958; Sporovi pri odabiranju govora za zajednički književni jezik Hrvata u 19. stoljeću, 1959). He carefully examined the work of Bogoslav Šulek and Adolfo Veber Tkalčević.

Jonke was a participant of the 1954 Novi Sad agreement, styliser and the editor of common orthography, and one of the editors of the Dictionary of Standard Serbo-Croatian. As soon as the application of Novi Sad conclusions was abandoned, he published a series of polemics with Serb linguists and writers in which he defended the right of the Croatian nation to its own language and the right of that language to achieve equal social status.

He edited two columns of language advice (from 1961 in Telegram and since 1971 in Vjesnik), and edited the journal Jezik for 17 years. From 1970 to 1971, he served as the President of Matica hrvatska. In 1963 he was elected as a member of JAZU.

Due to his alleged "Croat nationalism", having been denounced after signing the 1967 Declaration on the Status and Name of the Croatian Standard Language, and after the Croatian Spring (1971), he was forcibly retired in 1973. Since then he worked on the completion of the JAZU dictionary.

Jonke's main contribution (beside polemical and political discussions) is in revitalising the interest to the contributions of Zagreb philological school and its essential role in the standardisation of Croatian.

He died in Zagreb.

== Selected works ==
- Dikcionar Adama Patačića (Zagreb, 1949),
- Književni jezik u teoriji i praksi (Zagreb, 1st ed. 1964, 2nd ed. 1965),
- Hrvatski književni jezik 19. i 20. stoljeća (Zagreb, 1971),
- Hrvatski književni jezik danas (Zagreb, 1971; forbidden)

Cultural offices
Preceded by Hrvoje Iveković	President of Matica hrvatska 1970–1971	Succeeded by Petar Šegedin
