= Igor Ćutuk =

Croatian journalist

- Born: July 16, 1976 (age 50); Osijek, SR Croatia, SFR Yugoslavia
- Education: Vern University of Applied Sciences (Zagreb); University of Zadar (MA)
- Occupations: Journalism, public relations, corporate communication, linguistics
- Years active: 1996–present
- Notable work: The Language Manual of Coca-Cola HBC Croatia
- Awards: Young Author of the Year; Dr. Ivan Šreter Award

Igor Ćutuk (born July 16, 1976) is a Croatian journalist and certified public relations expert. In addition to a successful career in radio journalism, he is committed to raising the level in business communication with his activities and scientific works, which is evidenced by The Language Manual of Coca-Cola HBC Croatia, which was published in 2011 and which he co-authored. Since mid-July 2015 he is the spokesman and head of the Communications Department of Croatian Radiotelevision.

== Biography ==
Igor Ćutuk was born in Osijek, SFR Yugoslavia (modern-day Croatia). He studied journalism at Vern University of Applied Sciences in Zagreb and obtained a master's degree in journalism and public relations from the Tourism and Communications Department of the University of Zadar. He started working in the media in 1996 as a presenter, journalist and host at Osijek City Radio (Croatian: Gradski radio Osijek). From 1998 to 2004 he was an accredited Croatian correspondent for the American radio station Radio Free Europe and he also wrote for other media. He absolved media training at the National Public Radio in Washington and Boston. Over the years, he gained a lot of experience in communications and public relations, primarily at Coca-Cola HBC Croatia, where he worked from 2008 to 2015. Here he partook from October 2008 to September 2011 within the framework of the Business Communication Culture project together with external collaborators Lana Hudeček and Maja Matković in the development of The Language Manual of Coca-Cola HBC Croatia. Apart from working on the linguistic and lexical content, the project also involved a number of sub-projects aimed at introducing uniform and standardized communication, among other things on a linguistic level. At Coca-Cola HBC Croatia he held the position of public affairs manager from 2011 to 2015 and was responsible for managing external communications, media relations as well as socially responsible projects and practices in accordance with the strategic guidelines of Coca-Cola Hellenic Group. He became a certified public relations specialist in 2018.

He is particularly interested in linguistic issues in business communication and has published a number of scientific papers, both as an author and co-author, in the Croatian scientific journals Medijska istraživanja, Communications Management Review, Jezik and Liburna.

Between 2009 and 2015 he was a member of the Management Board of the Croatian Business Council for Sustainable Development. He has been a member of the Managing Board of the Croatian Association for Public Relations since January 2015, and since July 15 of the same year he has been the spokesman and head of the Communications Department of Croatian Radiotelevision.

== Bibliography ==
- Hudeček, Lana; Matković, Maja; Ćutuk, Igor: Jezični priručnik Coca-Cole HBC Hrvatska, Zagreb: Coca-Cola HBC Hrvatska, 2011^{1}, 2012^{2} ISBN 978-953-55515-2-2 (Electronic editions: www.hrpsor.hr and www.prirucnik.hr)
- Ćutuk, Igor: »Promicanje hrvatskoga jezika u Coca-Coli HBC Hrvatska«, in: Jezik 2012, 59/3, pp. 109–112.
- Ćutuk, Igor; Hudeček, Lana: »Normiranje naziva u poslovnome jeziku«, in: Međunarodni znanstveni časopis za kulturu, turizam i komuniciranje Liburna, 1 (2012), 1; 60–73.
- Hudeček, Lana; Ćutuk, Igor: »Jezik poslovnih časopisa«, in: Rišner, Vlasta (ur.): Jezik medija nekada i sada. Zbornik radova sa znanstvenoga skupa održanoga 6. i 7. lipnja 2014. godine na Filozofskom fakultetu u Osijeku, Zagreb/Osijek: Hrvatska sveučilišna naklada d.o.o./Filozofski fakultet u Osijeku, 2016, pp. 198–216.
- Ćutuk, Igor: »Victor Pickard. America’s Battle for Media Democracy – The Triumph of Corporate Libertarianism and the Future of Media Reform«, Cambridge University Press, 2014 (1 ed.), p. 259. Medijska istraživanja 21/2 (2015), pp. 155–159.

== Awards and recognitions ==
- 1999 – Award Young Author of the Year by the Osijek City Radio for journalistic work during the peaceful reintegration of the Croatian Danube region, as well as the monitoring of privatization and war victims in eastern Croatia.
- 2012 – Dr. Ivan Šreter Award for promotion of Croatian language in business communication (for 2011)

== Notes ==
1. The Language Manual of Coca-Cola HBC Croatia won the European CSR Award for corporate social responsibility in Croatia. Representatives of the project received this award at the European CSR Awards Ceremony in Brussels on June 25, 2013.
