= Adolfo Veber Tkalčević =

Croatian writer and literary critic

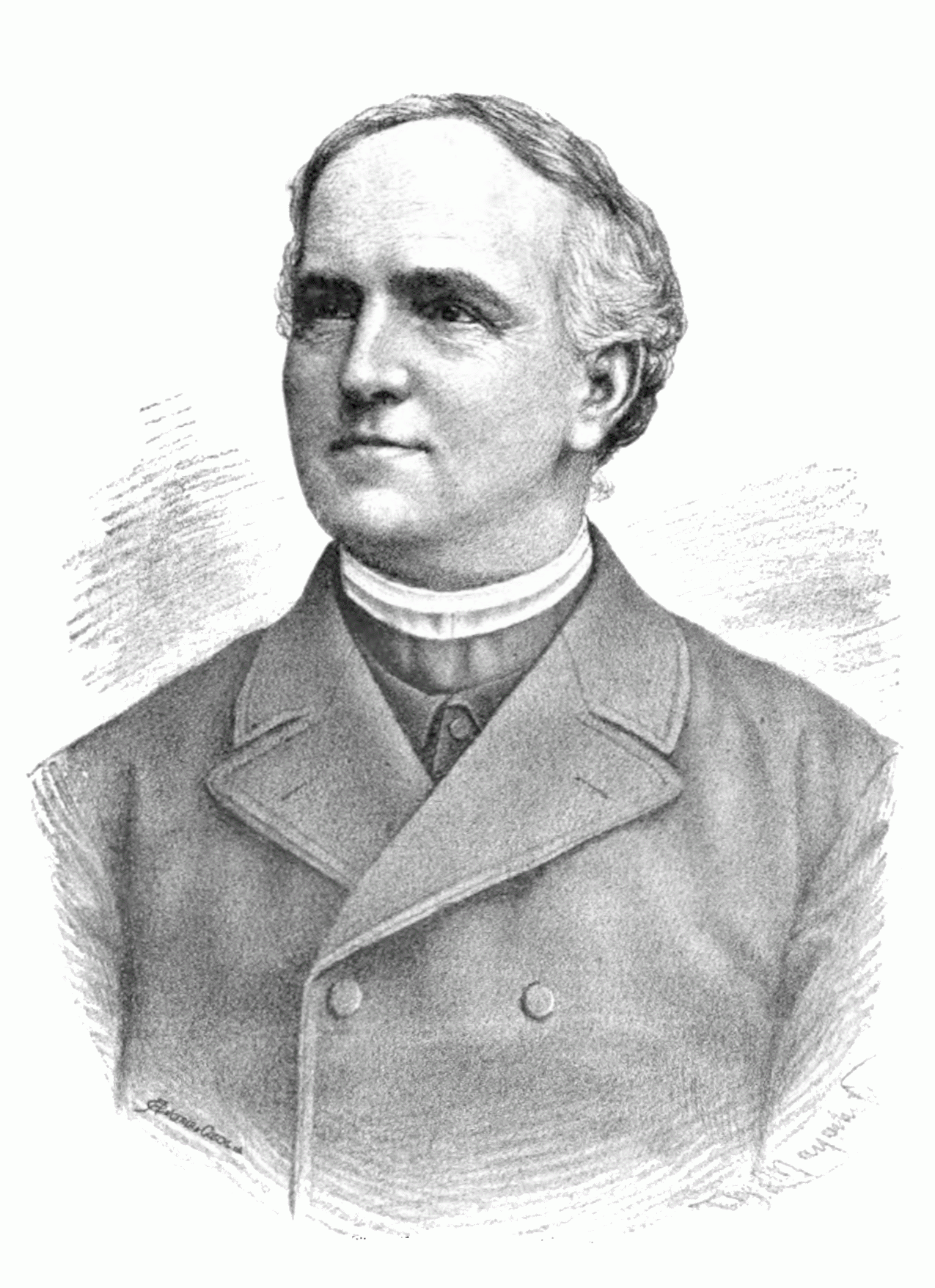
Adolfo Veber Tkalčević

Adolfo Veber Tkalčević (11 May 1825 − 6 August 1889) was a Croatian philologist, writer, literary critic, aesthetician, priest, and politician.

Veber is regarded as one of the most prominent Croatian intellectuals of the 19th century and as the founder of Croatian literary criticism.

== Life ==
Veber was born in Bakar in 1825. His father, Josef Weber, an army officer, was a German immigrant from Moravia.

He received degrees in philosophy in Zagreb, theology in Budapest and Slavistics in Vienna.

He has continued the tradition of the Illyrian movement, as outlined by Vjekoslav Babukić and Antun Mažuranić, but clearly distanced himself from Gaj's attempts of relating to Vuk Karadžić. He was important as one of the storytellers which has, in the middle of the 19th century, broken the practice of Turkish novellas and romantic prose introducing the elements of Realism into Croatian literature. His aesthetic views with a classicistic background influenced his philological works and many of his solutions in norming the Croatian standard language.

He was the author of the first syntax of Croatian literary language, Skladnja ilirskog jezika (Vienna, 1859). He authored several school-level textbooks and wrote grammars of Croatian and Latin language for high schools. His Slovnica hèrvatska, first published in 1871, has been used as standard high-school textbook, and as a norm and codification of standard language of the period.

Veber was a long-time secretary of Matica hrvatska and was one of the inaugural members of the Yugoslav Academy of Sciences and Arts.

Veber served two terms in the Parliament between 1861 and 1867, but retired from politics after the Croatian–Hungarian Settlement of 1868.

His defence of Illyrian views on literary language was published in Vienac in 1884 under the title Brus jezika ili zagrebačka škola. After Vjekoslav Babukić and Antun Mažuranić, he became the leader of Zagreb Philological School, in opposition to Vukovian orthography.

Veber died in Zagreb in 1889, virtually forgotten by his peers.

== Works ==
- Skladnja ilirskoga jezika, Vienna, 1859. (I ed.), 1862. (II ed.), reprint in Zagreb, 2005. (the first work on syntax of Croatian)
- Slovnica za četvrti razred katoličkih glavnih učionah u Carevini austrijanskoj, Vienna, 1862., 1863., 1867., 1868., 1870.
- Slovnica za IV. razred pučkih učionah, 1875.
- Slovnica hrvatska za pučke učione, Vienna, 1876.
- Slovnica hrvatska i pismovnik za pučke učione, Vienna, 1878., 1879.
- Slovnica hèrvatska za srednja učilišta, Zagreb 1871., 1873., 1876.
- Kako bi se imale pisati slovnice za gimnazije, uz nieke protuopazke na opazke gosp. dra. Jovana Turomana , Rad JAZU, Knj. 34(1876)
- Kritika o skladnji Petra Budmana izašloj u Beču g. 1867 : [književna obznana], Rad JAZU, Knj. 4, 1868.
- O glagolju, Rad JAZU, Knj. 22, 1873.
- O naravi hervatske izreke , Rad JAZU, Knj. 28, 1874.
- O pridavniku, Rad JAZU, Knj. 14, 1871.
- Pabirci po slovnici hrvatskoj, Rad JAZU, Knj. 42, 1878.

=== Fiction ===
- Zagrebkinje (1855)
- Avelina Bakranina ljuvezne sgode i nesgode (1855)
- Nadala Bakarka (1870)
- Paskva (1874)
- Dobrotvor djački (1879)
- Božićno zvonce (1886)

== Works about Veber ==
- Radoslav Katičić, Prva gramatika Adolfa Vebera Tkalčevića, Filologija, Knj. 14, 1986.

== Sources ==
- Švoger, Vlasta (December 2009). "Skica za portret Adolfa Vebera Tkalčevića (U povodu sto dvadesete obljetnice smrti)" [A sketch for the portrait of Adolfo Veber Tkalčević (On the occasion of 120th anniversary of death)] (PDF). Croatica Christiana Periodica (in Croatian). 33 (64): 107–136.
