= Vladimir Anić =

Croatian linguist and lexicographer

Vladimir Anić (21 November 1930 – 30 November 2000) was a Croatian linguist and lexicographer. He is the author of Rječnik hrvatskoga jezika (1991), the first modern single-volume dictionary of Croatian.

== Biography ==
Anić was born in the family of noted geologist Dragutin Anić, who had been stationed in Užice, Serbia at the time. Vladimir Anić completed gymnasium in Zagreb, and received a B.A. degree in Yugoslav languages and literature and Russian language and literature at the Faculty of Philosophy in Zagreb in 1956.

He moved to the Faculty of Philosophy in Zadar from 1960. In 1963 he obtained a Ph.D. with the thesis Language of Ante Kovačić, which was also published in Zagreb in 1971.

Anić also taught at universities in Germany in 1966/1967, Sweden in 1976 and in Slovenia.

In 1974, he moved back to the Faculty of Philosophy in Zagreb. He became a full professor in 1976. He served as the head of the Department of Croatian literary language between 1975 and 1992.

Between 1974 and 1979 he was the secretary of the International Committee of Slavists.

He died in Zagreb.

== Works ==
Anić published more than two hundred papers, studies, reviews and assays in subject areas of syntax, phonology, accentuation, morphology, lexicography, lexicology, terminology and stylistics.

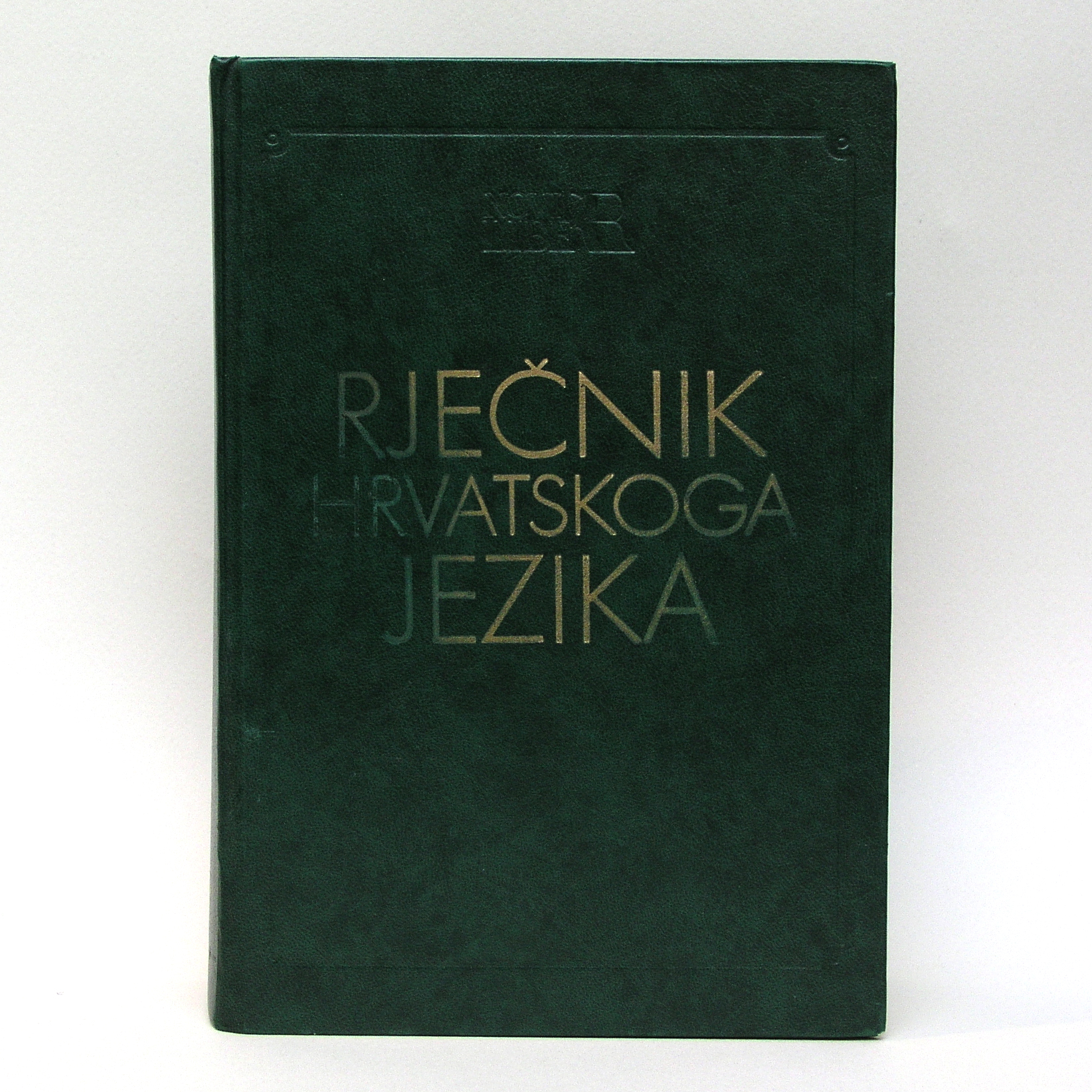
Anić's Dictionary of Croatian

Vladimir Anić's dictionary of Croatian started in 1972 and was published in December 1991, 90 years after the last comparable dictionary by Ivan Broz and Franjo Iveković. Two expanded and revised editions followed in 1994 and 1998, while the fourth edition, complete with a CD-ROM version, was published posthumously in 2003.

Other major works by Anić are Pravopisni priručnik hrvatskoga jezika (first published as Pravopisni priručnik hrvatskoga ili srpskoga jezika in 1986), an orthographic manual coauthored with Josip Silić, and Rječnik stranih riječi (1999), a dictionary of loanwords in Croatian, coauthored with Ivo Goldstein.

As a linguist, Vladimir Anić was a staunch descriptivist; he saw his dictionary as "not a book of best words, but a book of all words", and stressed the need for language creativity and freedom as a counterweight against purism.

== Legacy ==
Anić's work was one of the major underpinnings for the online Croatian dictionary Hrvatski jezični portal in 2006.
