= Zagreb School =

Zagreb school may refer to:

- School of Medicine, University of Zagreb
- Zagreb Philological School, 19th-century philological school that operated in Zagreb
- Zagreb School of Animated Films
- Zagreb School of Economics and Management
