= Miro Kačić =

Croatian linguist

- Born: 7 July 1946; Pučišća, SR Croatia, Yugoslavia (now Croatia)
- Died: February 6, 2001 (aged 54); Zagreb, Croatia
- Occupations: Writer, director
- Years active: 1961–2001

Miro Kačić (7 July 1946 – 6 February 2001) was a Croatian linguist.

After finishing primary school in Pučišća and high school in Zagreb, he enrolled in Faculty of Philosophy at the University of Zagreb where he graduated in Romance studies (French and Italian). After 1977 he worked as a lecturer in Croatian in France, where he received his Ph.D. at the University of Aix-en-Provence with a thesis Le theorie des ensembles et l'analyse linguistique ("Set theory and linguistic analysis") in which he developed his theories of algebraic linguistics and which has been published, due to the scientific prominence, at the expense of French government. After 1988 he worked at the Faculty of Philosophy in Zadar, where he taught general and French syntax, and applied linguistics. In 1992 he relocated to the Department of linguists of the Faculty of Philosophy in Zagreb. After 1996 and up until his death he served as a director of the Institute of Croatian Language and Linguistics and a professor of general linguistics.

His primary interests were theoretical and algebraic linguistics and topics related to Croatian studies, in which he gave sociolinguistic analysis of the influence of politics in the development of Slavic studies and pointed out the critical role of politically motivated linguistics in the creation and maintenance of Serbo-Croatian myth.

== Works ==
- Hrvatski i srpski. Krivotvorine i zablude ("Croatian and Serbian. Falsifications and delusions", Zagreb, 1995; translated to German, English and French)
- Jezikoslovna promišljanja ("Linguistic considerations", Zagreb, 2001)

== Sources ==
- Umro Miro Kačić (in Croatian)
- In memoriam: Miro Kačić (1946. - 2001.) (in Croatian)
