= Ante Kuzmanić =

Croatian physician and journalist

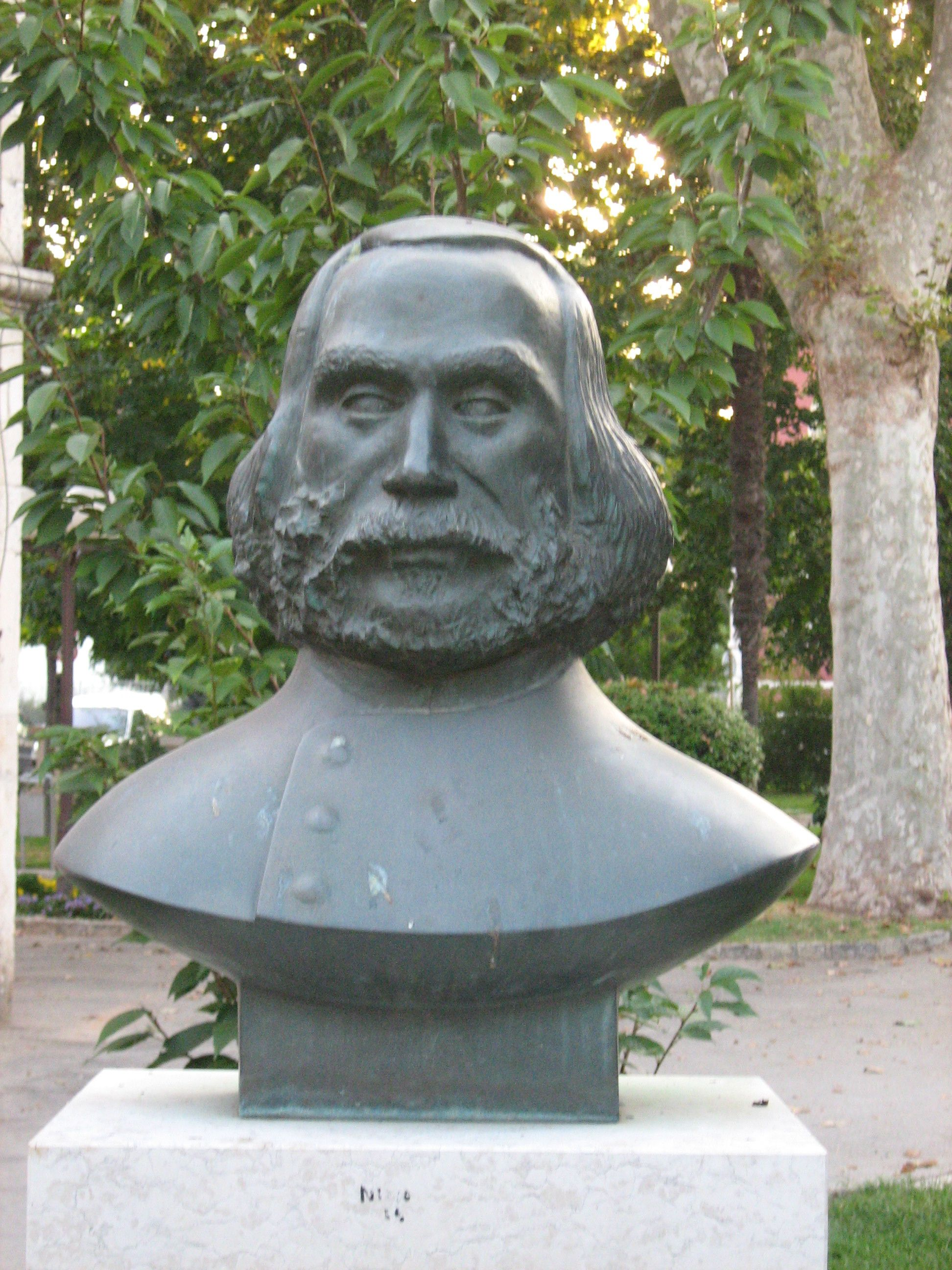
A bust of Ante Kuzmanić in Zadar.

Ante Kuzmanić (June 12, 1807 – December 10, 1879) was a Croatian medical doctor and journalist.

He was born in Split. He studied medicine in Vienna in 1827–1831 and received a master's degree in wound treatment and midwifery. He worked as a doctor in Imotski and Opuzen. In 1834 he was appointed as a professor of midwifery at the Midwifery School in Zadar.

Kuzmanić was at the forefront of the Zadar linguistic and cultural circle, resisting Italianization and Germanization, particularly as the leader of the Zadar Philological School. In 1844 he launched Zora dalmatinska ("The Dawn of Dalmatia") - the first magazine in the Croatian language in Dalmatia & the first literary weekly in Dalmatia. He served as its editor in 1844 and again in 1846–1849, having written a number of editorials and articles in various areas: language, literature, history, morality, agronomy, etc.

He initiated and edited more than fifteen newspapers, modeling them after contemporary European news standards. Particularly prominent was first Croatian legal newspaper Pravdonoša (1851), which is responsible for the creation of much of standard Croatian legal terminology.

He advocated the union of Dalmatia with the rest of Croatia under Croatian name, with Dalmatia being the center of Croatia's cultural life, and the Croatian literary language being standardized on the basis of Ikavian Štokavian dialect. He refused Ijekavian Štokavian dialect for the literary language, along with spelling reforms proposed by Ljudevit Gaj.

His books include Poslanica Dalmatincima (1861), Dobročinci splitski (1871) and others.

He died in Zadar.
