= Institute of Croatian Language =

Croatian linguistic institute and academic publisher

Coordinates: 45°48′42″N 15°57′28″E

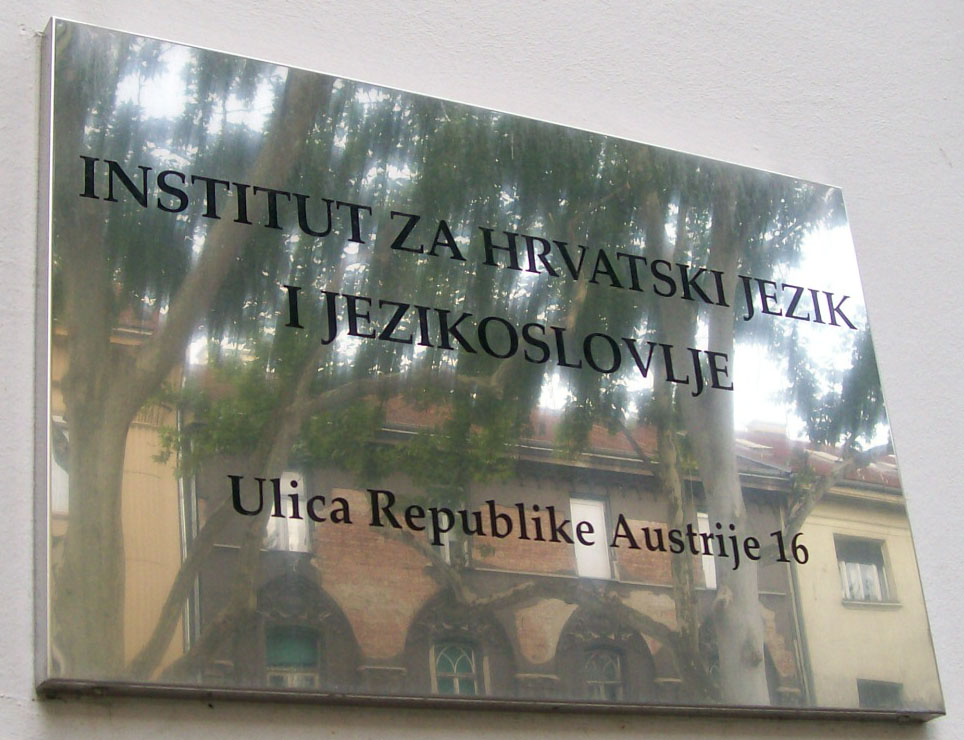
- Institute for the Croatian Language
- Other name: Croatian: Institut za hrvatski jezik
- Established: 1991
- Chair: Željko Jozić
- Formerly called: Institute of Croatian Language and Linguistics
- Address: Republike Austrije 16, 10 000 Zagreb
- Location: Zagreb, Croatia
- Website: http://ihjj.hr

The Institute for the Croatian Language (Croatian: Institut za hrvatski jezik, IHJ), formerly known as the Institute for the Croatian Language and Linguistics until 2023, is a state-run linguistics institute in Croatia whose purpose is to "preserve and foster" the Croatian language.

It traces its history back to 1948, when it was part of the Yugoslav Academy of Sciences and Arts. The modern institute as an independent institution dates back to 1991.

The Institute publishes Rasprave, a biannual journal.

== Directors ==
- Antun Barac
- Stjepan Musulin (1948–1958)
- Mate Hraste (1958–1965)
- Ljudevit Jonke (1965–1973)
- Božidar Finka (1973–1977)
- Antun Šojat (1977–1982)
- Božidar Finka (1982–1987)
- Mijo Lončarić (1987–1996)
- Miro Kačić (1996–2001)
- Marko Samardžija (2001–2002)
- Dunja Brozović-Rončević (2003–2011)
- Željko Jozić (2012–present)

== Departments ==
As of 2024, the Institute consists of 5 departments:

- Department of the history of Croatian language
- Department of general linguistics
- Department of standard Croatian language
- Department of dialectology
- Department of onomastics and etymology
