= Zagreb Philological School =

Zagreb philological school (Croatian: Zagrebačka filoložka škola) was a 19th-century philological school that operated in Zagreb, offering a set of solutions for the issues involved in the standardization of Croatian literary language. It was led by Adolfo Veber Tkalčević. In the 1860s it dominated Croatian cultural life, drawing upon linguistic and ideological conceptions advocated by the members of the Illyrian movement.

Solutions proposed by the Zagreb school were a combination of traditional orthographic practices, as well as amalgamation of various artificial and dialectal features that would satisfy the needs of most native speakers. Among these are:

- morphonological orthography (e.g. sudca "of judge", as opposed to suca)
- genitive plural ending -ah, which earned them a derisive nickname ahavci ("Ahavians")
- old case endings in the dative, locative and instrumental plural (e.g. nožim, nožih, noži)
- usage of the letter ě for the reflexes of Proto-Slavic yat sound (e.g. rěčnik)
- writing er for syllabic /r/ (e.g. perst)

The most important grammarians of the school were Vjekoslav Babukić, Antun Mažuranić and Adolfo Veber Tkalčević. On the area of lexicography the Croatized Slovak Bogoslav Šulek rose to prominence, particularly in the area of purism where he liberally coined neologisms and borrowed replacement from other Slavic languages for non-Slavic loanwords. The young Vatroslav Jagić was a firm supporter of Zagreb school's ideas, but eventually abandoned them.

The Zagreb philological school was dominant over the rival Rijeka Philological School and Zadar Philological School, primarily due to competences of its adherents. It was only with the advent of Croatian Vukovians that Zagreb school started to decline.
