= Aleksandar Bresztyenszky =

Croatian jurist and politician (1843–1904)

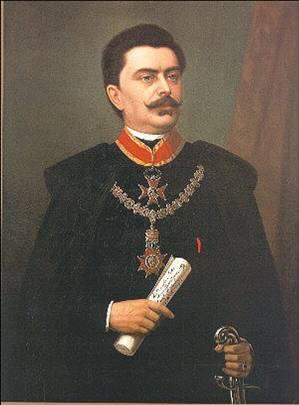
Aleksandar Bresztyenszky, 1881 painting by S. Milanese

Aleksandar Bresztyenszky, also known as Aleksandar Brešćenski and Šandor Brešćenski (September 6, 1843 – May 9, 1904) was a Croatian law writer and politician, professor and rector of the University of Zagreb.

Born in Prečec near Brckovljani, he studied law in Zagreb and Budapest, where he received his Ph.D. in 1868. He was the head of the Cathedra of Hungarian-Croatian Civil Law at the Law Academy, and soon after in 1874 on Law and State Faculty within the newly established Royal University of Franz Joseph I. In the inaugural rectorship ceremony for Stjepan Spevec, he held a welcome speech announcing the ceremony. He served as rector in the academic year 1880/1881, and after his mandate expired he founded Foundation Anke Bresztyenszky b. Štefanić for the best student expert discussion (a precursor to what is today Rector's Award). He served as a prorector in the academic year 1881–82.

After leaving the Unionist Party and the 1894 retirement, he began his publicist activity having joined the opposition as a leader of the Party of Rights. He was a city representative in Zagreb, and a representative in the parliament. He advocated unification of the Western and Eastern Church.

He died in Pleso near Velika Gorica. A street in Zagreb was named after him in 1933.

Academic offices
Preceded by Franjo Iveković	Rector of the University of Zagreb; 1880 – 1881	Succeeded by Franjo Marković
