= Vatroslav Rožić =

Vatroslav Rožić (13 March 1857 – 6 March 1937) was a Croatian linguist and ethnographer.

== Biography ==
He was born in Prodin Dol near Jastrebarsko. In Zagreb he attended classical gymnasium and studied Slavic languages, history and geography. He was a teacher in Zagreb and Zemun, and since 1905 a teacher in a gymnasium in Zagreb. He started out as a dialectologist with an extensive treatise Kajkavački dijalekat u Prigorju ("Kajkavian dialect of Prigorje", 1894). He wrote a number of grammatical and didactic works, but is mainly known for purist "cleansing" of the Croatian literary language, often exaggerating in his zeal.

His main work is a 1904 book Barbarizmi u hrvatskom ili srpskom jeziku ("Barbarisms in Croatian or Serbian language"; ²1908, ³1913). Being a Croatian Vukovian, his ideal language was "a clean Štokavian literary language" without loanwords, Chakavisms, Kajkavisms, neologisms and archaisms.

Rožić also published Prigorje. Narodni život i običaji ("Prigorje. People's lives and customs") in Zbornik za narodni život i običaje Južnih Slavena ("Proceedings for folk life and customs of the South Slavs", 1907–08) - an ethnographic monograph about his homeland, written in the local dialect.
