= Jezik =

Croatian linguistic scientific journal

Jezik (lit. "Language") is a Croatian language literary magazine published in Croatia by the Croatian Philological Society since 1952. Its editors-in-chief have included Ljudevit Jonke and Stjepan Babić.

The magazine is known for its annual Dr. Ivan Šreter Award for the best neologism.

== See also ==
- Croatian linguistic purism
