= Ivan Šreter =

Croatian physician (1951–1991)

Ivan Šreter (1951–1991), a Croatian physician who was persecuted by Yugoslav authorities. He was killed in 1991 by Serbs in the Croatian War of Independence.

== Biography ==
In October 1984 Dr. Šreter examined as a specialist doctor at the Lipik Hospital a patient named Stevo Majstorovic and, when entering the patients' occupation in the medical record, he wrote the Croatian term "umirovljeni časnik" (retired officer) instead of the Serbian equivalent "penzionisani oficir". Because of this he was sentenced to jail time in Communist Yugoslavia in 1987 for choosing to use the distinct Croatian umirovljeni časnik to refer to his patient as a retired officer, rather than using penzionisani oficir. During the Croatian War of Independence he was taken captive by Serb troops and presumably killed, although his remains have not been found as of April 2008.

== Legacy ==
In his honor the Croatian Linguistic Award since 2005 is named Dr. Ivan Šreter Award.

== See also ==
- Linguistic discrimination
- Cultural assimilation
