= Franjo Maixner =

Croatian university professor

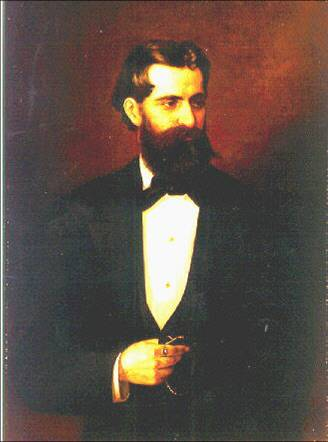
Franjo Maixner, 1880 painting by Ferdo Quiquerez

Franjo Maixner (August 4, 1841 – March 2, 1903) was a Croatian university professor and rector of the University of Zagreb.

Born in Osijek, he graduated philosophy at the Charles University in Prague. In 1886, he founded a Seminar for Classical Philology (today Department for Classical Philology) at the Faculty of Humanities and Social Sciences, University of Zagreb, holding a position of the first professor. In the academic year 1878/1879 he served as a rector of the University of Zagreb, and after his rectorship mandate expired, as a prorector of the Royal University of Franz Joseph in Zagreb. Up until 1888 he alone conducted all the teaching activity at the newly established department, including the courses on Latin language and literature. He became full member of the Yugoslav Academy of Sciences and Arts in 1882.

Maixner wrote works on grammar, Classical literature and archeology. Of the classical authors, he chiefly studied Cicero. He also studied Croatian latinistic literature. He died in Zagreb.

== Works ==
- Prilog tumačenju "dragulja" I and II (1879)

Academic offices
Preceded by Konstantin Vojnović	Rector of the University of Zagreb; 1878 – 1879	Succeeded by Franjo Iveković
