= Zadar Philological School =

19th century philological school

Zadar Philological School (Croatian: Zadarska filološka škola) was a 19th-century philological school that operated in Zadar, offering a set of solutions for the issues involved in the standardization of Croatian literary language. It was led by Ante Kuzmanić.

The schools' members initially published articles in the magazine Zora dalmatinska ("The Dalmatian Dawn") which they started in Zadar, 1844. As the basis of the Croatian standard language they advocated the old Dalmatian orthography, phonological spelling, and the usage of Ikavian Štokavian dialect which was common to Dalmatia, Bosnia and Slavonia and was used in many important literary works during the history. Later they accepted Gaj's orthography, but kept the Ikavian dialect.

Kuzmanić's associates included Šime Starčević from Lika and Ignjat Alojzije Brlić from Slavonia. The second generation of the Zadar Philological School published in the newspaper Narodni list, and saw the future in the ideas that circulated from Zagreb and the literary language of Dubrovnik.

== See also ==
- Zagreb Philological School
- Rijeka Philological School
