= Dr. Ivan Šreter Award =

The Dr. Ivan Šreter Award (Croatian: Nagrada Dr. Ivan Šreter) is an annual Croatian linguistics award for the best Croatian language word coined.

The award is named after Dr. Ivan Šreter (1951–1991), a Croatian physician who was sentenced to jail time in Communist Yugoslavia in 1987 for choosing to use the distinct Croatian umirovljeni časnik to refer to his patient as a retired officer, rather than using penzionisani oficir. During the Croatian War of Independence he was taken captive by Serb troops and presumably killed, although his remains have not been found as of April 2008.

The contest and the award was initially designed by Stjepan Babić, and it has been organized by the literary magazine Jezik since 1993.

== Winners ==
- 1993 - László Bulcsú for suosnik, as a replacement for the term koaksijalni kabel (Eng: coaxial cable)
- 1998 - straničnik as a replacement for bookmark
- 2006 - Nada Arar-Premužić for uspornik, as a replacement for the term ležeći policajac (Eng: speed bump)
- 2007 - Vilim Pantlik for naplatnica as a replacement for naplatna kućica (Eng: tollbooth)
- 2009 - Drago Štambuk for proširnica, as a replacement for žilni potporanj (Eng: stent)
- 2010 - Vinko Vukadin for ispraznica as a replacement for floskula (Eng: platitude)
- 2011 - Šandor Dembitz for zatipak as a replacement for tipfeler (Eng: typo)
- 2018 - Lidija Stević Brtan for zapozorje as a replacement for backstage
- 2020 - Drago Štambuk and Karlo Kulaš for dišnik as a replacement for respirator
- 2023:
  - Tomislav Meštrović and Ognjen Ožegić for prestrujnik as a replacement for adapter or strujni adapter (Eng: power adapter)
  - Leonardo Štrac and Izabela Štrac for Šećerice as a replacement for sugarcane
  - Marko Bukna and Martina Pehar for bakroza as a replacement for Wilson's disease
- 2024: Plovopis (Sailing story – a literary or other work describing a journey by ship or vessel, by Dubravko Merlić), čvornik ( "hub", or central point of connection, by Martina Šarić), uglednina (goodwill (accounting), by Juraj Borić)
- 2025: presudnik ("Video assistant referee", by Josipa Curić), dohvatnica ("widget", - a digital tool used to retrieve and display information such as weather forecasts or news", by Antonio Zandona), narubno (an adverb denoting a way of opening a window "on the edge" or "on the corner", by Majda Joha)
