= Loanwords in Serbian =

Words loaned from other languages

Most Serbian words are of native Slavic lexical stock, tracing back to the Proto-Slavic language. There are many loanwords from different languages, reflecting cultural interaction throughout history. Notable loanwords were borrowed from Greek, Latin, Italian, Persian, Turkish, Hungarian, Russian, English and German.

== Overview ==
It is estimated that there are 900–1,200 Greek, 88–188 German, and an uncertain high number of Turkish and Persian loanwords in modern Serbian.

== History ==
=== Proto-Slavic ===
Ancient Greek words in Proto-Slavic are identified through phonetic features, some related to Greek phonetic history, others possibly Scythian-Sarmatian or Gothic mediations. Ancient Greek, non-mediated words are korablja (ark), koliba (cottage, hut), and supposedly trem (porch); Scythian mediations are luk (onion), haluga (fence), koš (basket), talog (dregs), kurva (whore, slut, skank, hooker); supposedly Gothic mediations are crkva (church) and daska (plank). There exists loanwords in Proto-Slavic from non-Indo-European languages. Among Uralic and Turkic lexemes, estimated to have been adopted between the 3rd and 7th century, surviving into modern Serbian are čaša (cup, mug, glass), knjiga (book), kovčeg (chest), krčag (pitcher), sablja (sabre). Adoptions from Avaric in the 6th–7th centuries are the titles ban and župan, and klobuk (a type of hat). South Slavic was also influenced by Bulgar since their arrival in the eastern Balkans in the 7th century, e.g. beleg (landmark), beočug (shackle), bubreg (kidney), pašenog (co-brother-in-law), tojaga (bludgeon).

=== Old Serbian ===
The South Slavic languages were greatly influenced by Greek beginning in the Early Middle Ages, through translation of Byzantine works, leaving religious, philosophical and psychological terms. Late medieval speech had very few loanwords, rather replacing Greek words with calques for linguistical purity. German linguist Vasmer (1944) recorded 1,000 Greek words in Serbian, most of which were addressed in the Old Serbian form. Today, it is estimated that 900–1,200 Grecisms (grecizmi) exist in Serbian, more than 400 being in the church-religious section. In the economical section, apart from Greek, many words in Old Serbian were Romance. In mining, the majority of words were Germanic, arriving with Saxons.

=== Modern history ===
The Ottoman conquest began a linguistical contact between Ottoman Turkish and South Slavic; Ottoman Turkish influence grew stronger after the 15th century. Besides Turkish loanwords, also many Arabic (such as alat, "tool", sat, "hour, clock") and Persian (čarape, "socks", šećer, "sugar") words entered via Turkish, called "Orientalisms" (orijentalizmi). Also, many Greek words entered via Turkish. Words for hitherto unknown sciences, businesses, industries, technologies and professions were brought by the Ottoman Empire. Christian villagers brought urban vocabulary from their travels to Islamic culture cities. Many Turkish loanwords are no longer considered loanwords.

In the 19th and early 20th century Serbian, unlike the Croatian, version of the Serbo-Croat language continuum was much more open to internationalisms (words from Latin and Classical Greek) used in sciences and arts (cf. Serbian istorija vs. Croatian povijest = history and such).

=== Contemporary situation ===
English influence is seen in recent times, with the common suffixes -er and -ing. Examples are kasting, ketering, konsalting, listing, džoging, šoping, etc. Foreign loanwords are becoming more frequent in sports terminology.

== Comparison with other Serbo-Croatian variants ==
The differences between Serbian and Croatian is mainly reflected in loanwords. Bosnian has the most Ottoman Turkish loanwords of all Serbo-Croatian variants.

=== Purism ===
Serbo-Croatian vocabulary is of mixed origin, with words borrowed from Greek, Latin, Italian, Turkish, Hungarian, and more recently Russian, Czech and German. Most loanwords have entered Serbian without resistance, while on the other hand in Croatian, linguistic purism was adopted as a policy during Austria-Hungary (against presumed Germanization) and later in Yugoslavia (against presumed Serbian domination). In Croatia, the term "Serbisms" is used for characteristically Serbian words, unwanted during World War II and the Yugoslav wars, many of which have been replaced by neologisms.

== Examples ==
- alas, "river fisherman", from Hungarian halász
- alat, "tools", from Arabic آلة via Turkish
- ašov, "shovel, spade", from Hungarian ásó
- avlija, "yard", from Greek via Turkish
- badem, "almond", from Persian bādām via Turkish
- baksuz, "bad luck", from Turkish
- bakšiš, "tip", from Turkish
- barut, "gunpowder", from Turkish
- biber, "pepper", from Greek via Turkish
- bitanga, "bastard, rascal, rogue, scum", from Hungarian bitang
- brak, "marriage", from Russian
- bubreg, "kidney", from Turkish böbrek
- budala, "fool", from Turkish
- bunar, "water well", from Turkish pınar
- bunda, "fur coat", from Hungarian
- burazer, "bro", from Turkish (colloquial)
- burma, "wedding ring", from Turkish burma
- bre, interjection, from Turkish or Greek
- čaj, "tea", from Persian or Turkish çay
- čak, "even" (adv), "albeit", from Turkish çok
- čamac, "small boat", from Turkish
- ćao, greeting, from Italian ciao
- časopis, "magazine", from Czech
- čarapa, "socks", from Arabic جوراب via Turkish
- čaršav, "sheet", from Persian chādorshab via Turkish
- ćelav, "bald", from Turkish kel
- ćevapi, a grilled meat dish similar to sausages, from Turkish kebab
- čelik, "steel", from Turkish çelik
- cipele, "shoes", from Hungarian cipellő
- čizme, "boots", from Turkish çizme
- čoban, "shepherd", from Turkish çoban
- ćorav, "blind, near sighted", from Turkish kör
- čorba, "soup", from Turkish çorba
- crkva, "church", from Greek kyriakón
- čudovište, "monster", from Russian
- ćufta, "meatball", from Persian kufteh via Turkish
- ćuprija, "bridge", from Turkish köprü
- cvekla, "beet", from Greek
- daska, "plank", from Greek
- drum, "road", from Greek drómos
- đak, "student, pupil", from Greek diákos
- đakon, "deacon", from Greek diákonos
- đubre, "garbage, trash, rubbish", from Greek kópros via Turkish
- dugme, "button", from Turkish "düğme"
- dušek, "mattress", from Turkish "döşek"
- duvan, "tobacco", from Persian dokhān via Turkish
- džep, "pocket", from Arabic جَيْب via Turkish
- džigerica, "beef", from Persian jegar via Turkish
- episkop, "bishop", from Greek épískopos
- guma, "rubber", from Greek kómmi
- hartija, "paper", from Greek chartí
- hiljada, "a thousand", from Greek khiliás
- jeftin, "inexpensive, cheap", from Greek
- jok, "no", from Turkish yok (colloquial)
- kada, "bathtub", from Greek kádos
- kamata, "interest", from Greek kámatos
- karanfil, "carnation", from Sanskrit "kaṭuka-phala कटुकफल" via Turkish
- kasarna, "barracks", from French caserne
- kesa, "bag, sack", from Persian kiseh via Turkish
- kesten, "chestnut", from Greek kástana via Turkish
- klisura, "gorge", from Greek kleisoúra
- kobila, "mare, female horse", from unknown, cf. Latin caballus, "horse"
- koliba, "cottage", from Greek
- kočija, "carriage, chariot", from Hungarian kocsi
- koljivo, "wheat", from Greek
- komad, "piece, parcel", from Greek kommátion
- korablja, "ark", from Greek
- koš, "basket", from Greek
- kravata, "necktie", from French cravate
- krevet, "bed", from Greek kreváti via Turkish
- kruna, "crown", from Latin corona
- kum, "godfather", from Latin compare
- kutija, "box", from Greek koutí
- lapsus, "lapse, mistake in a speech", from Latin
- ličnost, "individual, personality", from Russian
- livada, "meadow, field of flowers", from Greek livádi
- lopov, "thief", from Hungarian lopó
- luk, "onion", from Ancient Greek
- majmun, "monkey", from Arabicمايمون via Turkish
- majstor, "master, repairman", from German meister
- miris, "smell, aroma, odour", from Greek mýron
- nafta, "petroleum", from Greek náphtha
- nagrada, "reward, prize", from Russian
- nana, "mint", from Persian na'nā via Turkish
- narandža, "orange", from Persian nāranj via Turkish
- pantalone, "trousers, pants", from Italian
- papuče, "slippers", from Persian pāpush via Turkish
- pasoš, "passport", from Hungarian passzus via German
- patos, "floor", from Greek pátos
- peškir, "towel", from Turkish "peşkir"
- piljan, "godson", from Latin filianus (archaic)
- pita, "pie", from Greek píta
- podrum, "basement", from Turkish "bodrum"
- pop, "priest", from Greek papás
- putir, "chalice", from Greek potḗr
- rovit, "weak, liquid, fluid", from Greek
- rajsferšlus, "zipper", from German
- sanduk, "chest", from Arabic صندوق via Turkish
- šator, "tent", from Persian chādor via Turkish
- šećer, "sugar", from Persian shekar via Turkish
- šiparac, "young boy'", from Turkish şıpar
- šnajder, "tailor", from German
- šnicla, "steak", from German
- šrafciger, "screwdriver", from German
- štrudla, "strudel" (a type of pie), from German
- sidro, "anchor", from Greek sídiros
- simpatičan, "nice", from Italian simpatico
- sirće, "vinegar", from Turkish sirke
- snajper, "marksman shooter", from English (US) sniper
- soba, "room", from Hungarian szoba
- somun, "bread, loaf, bun", from Greek via Turkish
- stanovništvo, "population", from Czech
- sunđer, "sponge", from Greek
- talas, "wind or sea wave", from Greek thálassa
- tašna, "bag", from German tasche via Turkish taşın
- tiganj, "pan, skillet", from Greek tigáni
- top, "cannon" from Turkish top
- trpeza, "dining table", from Greek (archaic)
- usled, "due to", from Russian
- varoš, "town, borough", from Hungarian város

== See also ==
- Arabic-Persian-Greek-Serbian Conversation Textbook

== Sources ==
- Alanović, Milivoj (2014). "Germanismen im Serbischen: von systemeigenen zu abweichenden morphosyntaktischen Eigenschaften" (PDF). Slavic Eurasian Studies. 26.
- Alanović, Milivoj (2006). "Susret sa Zapadnom Evropom: galicizmi u srpskom jeziku". Susret Kultura: 599–608.
- Benson, M. (1967). "English Loanwords in Serbo-Croatian". American Speech. 42 (3): 178–189. doi:10.2307/453347. JSTOR 453347.
- Filipovic, R. (1961). "Morphological adaptation of English loan words in Serbo-Croatian". Studia Romanica et Anglica: 11–100.
- Hadrovics, Làszló (1985). Ungarische Elemente im Serbokroatischen. Böhlau. ISBN 978-3-412-00984-7.
- Ivić, Pavle (1995). "Standard language as an instrument of culture and the product of national history". The history of Serbian Culture. Rastko.
- Klajn, Ivan (2008). "Purizam i antipurizam u današnjem srpskom jeziku". Južnoslovenski Filolog. 64 (64): 153–176. doi:10.2298/JFI0864153K.
- Klajn, Ivan (2001). "Neologisms in present-day Serbian". International Journal of the Sociology of Language: 89–110.
- Klajn, Ivan; Šipka, Milan (2006). Veliki rečnik stranih reči i izraza. Prometej.
- Lečić, Dario (2014). "Remnants of Serbo-Croatian Lexis in Present-day Croatian" (PDF). Slavia Centralis: 49–66.
- Milić, Mira; Sokić, Radmila (1998). "Reči stranog porekla u sportskoj terminologiji u srpskom jeziku". Facta Universitatis. 1 (5).
- Mønnesland, Svein (1973). "Loanwords in the two variants of Serbo-Croatian". Scando-Slavica. 19: 197–205. doi:10.1080/00806767308600639.
- Nomachi, Motoki (2015). ""East" and "West" as Seen in the Structure of Serbian: Language Contact and Its Consequences" (PDF). Slavic Eurasian Studies. 28.
- Vasmer, Max (1944). Die griechischen Lehnwörter im Serbo-Kroatischen. Zentralantiquariat der Deutschen Demokratischen Republik.
- Vlajić-Popović, Jasna (2009). "Грецизми у српском језику: осврт на досадашња и поглед на будућа истраживања". Јужнословенски филолог. LXV: 375–403.
- Vlajić-Popović, Jasna (2015). "Serbian and Greek: A Long History of Lexical Borrowing" (PDF). Slavic Eurasian Studies. 28.
- Herrity, P. (1978). "Puristic Attitudes in Serbia in the second half of the nineteenth century". The Slavonic and East European Review. 56 (2): 202–223.
- Radić, Prvoslav (2015). "On the Oriental Lexicon in the Serbian Language" (PDF). Slavic Eurasian Studies. 28.
- Rajić, Jelena (1995), Хиспанизми у српском језику и њихов третман у "Речнику српскохрватског књижевног језика "Матице српске и "Речнику српскохрватског књижевног и народног језика", SANU, pp. 241–246
- Sipka, D. (2008). "Germanismen Im Serbischen Und Kroatischen". Canadian Slavonic Papers. 50 (3–4): 531–.
- Štasni, Gordana R.; Štrbac, Gordana R. (2015). "Именички англицизми на -ер у српском језику" [Nominal Anglicisms in -er in Serbian]. Јужнословенски филолог. 71 (1–2): 43–67. doi:10.2298/JFI1502043S.
- Štrbac, Gordana R.; Štasni, Gordana R. (2014). "Именички англицизми на -инг у српском језику" [Nominal Anglicisms in -ing in Serbian] (PDF). Зборник Матице српске за филологију и лингвистику. 57 (2): 101–113.
- Recueil de dialectologie serbe. Akademija. 1911.
