= Croatian Vukovians =

Croatian Vukovians (Serbo-Croatian: hrvatski vukovci) refers to a group of Croatian linguists, followers of Vuk Karadžić (hence the name), that were active at the end of the 19th and the beginning of the 20th century. Their work focused on the standardization of the Croatian language. They were led by Tomislav Maretić, and the most prominent members were Franjo Iveković, Ivan Broz, Pero Budmani, Armin Pavić, Vatroslav Rožić and others.

At the period when Vukovians operated, the issue of a dialectal basis for literary Croatian was not yet settled. Vukovians supported the Neoštokavian Ijekavian dialect (Eastern Herzegovinian dialect) as recorded by Vuk Karadžić and described by Đuro Daničić. They advocated the use of phonological orthography. Through their positions at the Yugoslav Academy of Sciences and Arts and the University of Zagreb they exerted influence on the standardization of literary Croatian.

They published three fundamental works:

- Broz, Ivan (1892). Hrvatski pravopis [Croatian Normative Guide]. ISBN 978-953-7967-14-7. CROSBI 747843.
- Maretić, Tomislav (1899). Gramatika i stilistika hrvatskoga ili srpskoga jezika [Grammar and stylistics of Croatian or Serbian language].
- Iveković, Franjo; Broz, Ivan (1901). Rječnik hrvatskoga jezika [Dictionary of Croatian language]. ISBN 978-953-6006-80-9.

Primarily due to political reasons as well as their professional competence, the standardized and orthographic conventions introduced and advocated by Vukovians were dominant at the end of the 19th century, and have shaped the course of the language standardization in Croatia in the first half of the 20th century. In their normative works (Maretić's grammar, Broz's orthography and the Broz–Iveković dictionary) they contributed to the final formation of the Croatian standard on a Neoštokavian dialect basis.
