= Franjo Iveković =

Croatian linguist and lay theologian

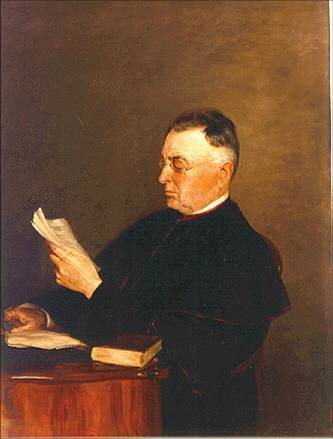
- Franjo Iveković, a painting by Oton Iveković, 1894
- Born: September 19, 1834; Klanjec, Kingdom of Croatia, Austrian Empire (now Klanjec, Croatia)
- Died: March 2, 1914 (aged 79); Zagreb, Kingdom of Croatia-Slavonia, Austria-Hungary (now Zagreb, Croatia)
- Occupations: linguist, writer, lay theologian

Franjo Iveković (September 19, 1834 – March 2, 1914) was a Croatian linguist, writer, theologian, professor, and rector of the University of Zagreb.

Born in Klanjec, he studied theology in Zagreb and Pest, receiving his Ph.D. in theology in Vienna. For a brief period he served as a chaplain of the St. Mark's Church, Zagreb. At the Faculty of Theology in Zagreb he taught Oriental languages and biblical exegesis. In 1875, he served as a docent, becoming a full professor at the Faculty of Theology in 1878. He was rector of the University of Zagreb in the academic year 1879-1880 and, after his mandate expired, he served as a prorector. He also served as the director of the Nobility Boarding School and a canon.

On the basis of the material collected by his deceased nephew Ivan Broz, along with his own research, he published an influential two-volume dictionary of Croatian in 1901. He published his papers in various journals and periodicals, including Vienac, Rad, Književnik, and Katolički list, among others

Iveković died in Zagreb. The stairs on the Zagreb Gornji grad were named after him in 1931.

== Works ==
- Životi svetaca i svetica božjih (1873–1888, ^{2}1892-1908)
- Biblijska povjest starozavjetne objave Božje za srednja učilišta (1879, ^{2}1895, ^{3}1900, ^{4}1907, ^{5}1913., ^{6}1918, ^{7}1921)
- Biblijska povijest novozavjetne objave Božje za srednja učilišta (1879, ^{2}1898, ^{3}1911)
- Rječnik hrvatskoga jezika. Svezak I. A - O. (1901)
- Rječnik hrvatskoga jezika. Svezak II. P - Ž. (1901)

Academic offices
Preceded by Franjo Maixner	Rector of the University of Zagreb; 1879 – 1880	Succeeded by Aleksandar Bresztyenszky
