= Ivan Broz =

Croatian linguist and historian

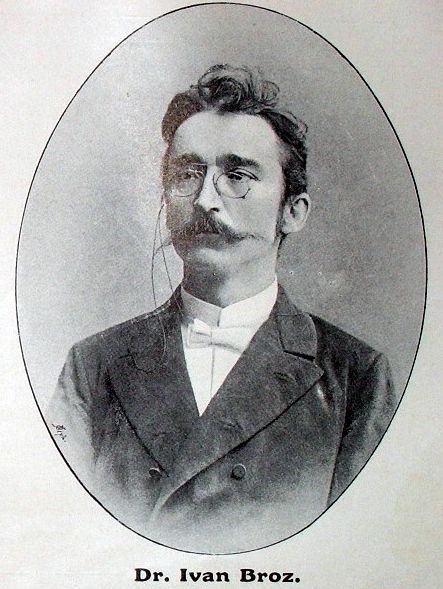
- Born: January 21, 1852; Klanjec, Kingdom of Croatia, Austrian Empire (now Klanjec, Croatia)
- Died: December 25, 1893 (aged 41); Zagreb, Kingdom of Croatia-Slavonia, Austria-Hungary (now Zagreb, Croatia)
- Occupations: linguist, historian
- Known for: Croatian Orthography

Ivan Broz (Croatian pronunciation: [ǐʋan brôːz]; 21 January 1852 – 25 December 1893) was a Croatian linguist and literary historian. He is best known for his book Croatian Orthography (Hrvatski pravopis in Croatian).

== Biography ==
Broz was born in Klanjec, where he attended primary school, before continuing his education in Varaždin. He completed his pre-university education at the Karlovac Gymnasium. In Innsbruck, he began studying theology, but eventually switched to Croatian language, history, and geography at the newly established Croatian university in Zagreb. He worked as a substitute teacher in Zagreb and later as a regular teacher in gymnasiums (upper secondary schools) in Osijek, Požega, and Zagreb. He earned his doctorate in 1888. Later, he attended Vatroslav Jagić’s Slavic studies lectures in Vienna and conducted field research across Bosnia and Herzegovina and southern Croatia. During his fieldwork, Broz became ill and died in Zagreb.

== Work ==
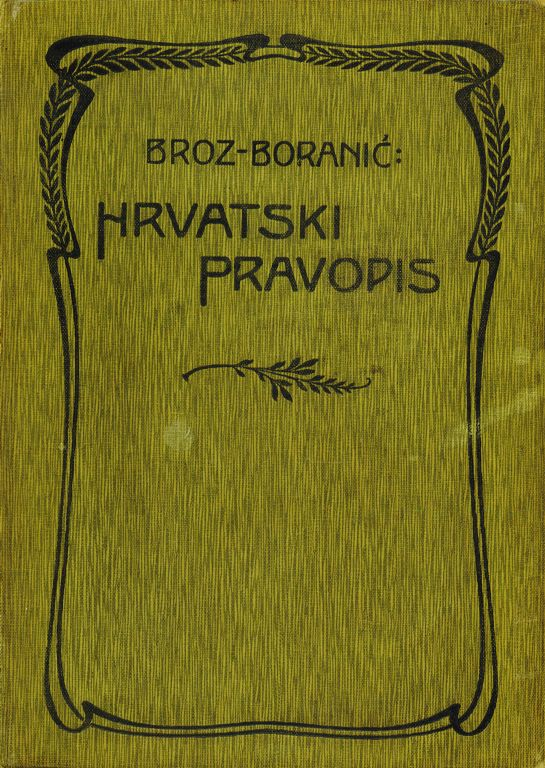
Croatian Orthography (Hrvatski pravopis), 1911 edition

In 1885, in Matica hrvatska, he was appointed the editor of Hrvatske narodne pjesme (Croatian folk songs). In his Crtice iz hrvatske književnosti, a two-volume work, he gave an extensive overview of the oldest Croatian literary monuments. He authored a study on the Croatian imperative and numerous puristic articles (Filologičke sitnice). In 1889, he was appointed to make a normative guide for Croatians.

In 1892, he published his most recognized work, Hrvatski pravopis (Croatian Orthography), which was reprinted under the editorship of Dragutin Boranić until 1916. That normative guide, which was strictly based on Karadžić-Daničić's normative conception but formed chiefly upon the normative role model of the Croatian philologist Marcel Kušar, established the Croatian standard. In fact, many of the later Croatian normative manuals are stylizations of Broz's work.

Broz left a deep mark in the final standardization of Croatian: thanks to him, there was no normative duality, which had been threatened by the introduction of phonologically based spelling in Dalmatia and Bosnia (manual by Frane Vuletić), and by the introduction of some rules from the normative standard of the Zagreb school (separate writing of the future tense, writing foreign names as in the original, avoiding voicing assimilation in most cases [podcijeniti, odčepiti, etc.], morphological forms in several cases [mladac/mladci, etc.]). He established firm ground for continuity with the older (chiefly Dubrovnik) normative tradition and secured a transition to the final normative form, avoiding controversies like those that closely followed the linguistic interventions of his contemporary Tomislav Maretić.

== Sources ==
- "Umro Ivan Broz". hrt.hr (in Croatian). Croatian Radiotelevision. 25 December 2011.
