= Rijeka Philological School =

Croatian philological school

Rijeka Philological School (Croatian: Riječka filološka škola) was a 19th-century philological school that operated in Rijeka, offering a set of solutions for the issues involved in the standardization of Croatian literary language. It was led by Fran Kurelac.

According to Kurelac, standard language should be based on elements shared by most of the Slavic languages. Modern literary language should be based on archaic forms, so archaicity became the main characteristic of the language of school's proponents. Among such features where:

- zero morpheme as the genitive plural ending (jelen, žen, sel)
- usage of dual in nouns and verbs (dvaju rukopisu, uvedosta me u kuću)
- first-person singular present form on -u (raduju se "I rejoice", as opposed to radujem se)
- usage of the demonstrative pronoun s, si, se "this, that" (se jeseni "this autumn")
- usage of infinitives without the final -i (pokazat)
- usage of archaic Croatian words, Church Slavonicisms and words from other Slavic languages (božjački "poorly, miserably", naočnjaci "glasses", paklina "resin", horugva "flag", batog "stick, club", rabota "work" etc.)

Kurelac's enthusiasm for archaic forms provided a basis for his purist views. He was opposed to loanwords and calques from German, Italian and Ottoman Turkish, but a bit more tolerant towards the loanwords from Slavic languages. Because most of his followers were gymnasium students with no trained future philologist among them, Rijeka Philological School soon ceased being a relevant competitor to Zagreb Philological School.

One of the most active followers was Ivan Dežman (1841–1837), who published Rěčnik lěčničkoga nazivlja (Zagreb, 1868).

Other members include Ivan Črnčić (1830–1897), Ivan Fiamin (1833–1890), Fran Pilepić (philologist) (1838–1890) and Bude Budisavljević (1843–1919).

In addition, there were a few who received the attempted reforms of Kurelac positively without implementing many of his suggestions themselves, such as Marijan Derenčin (1836–1908), Lavoslav Vukelić (1840–1879), Tadija Smičiklas (1843–1914), Franjo Marković (1845–1914), Fran Jelačić, and to an extent Vinko Pacel (1825–1869) and Franjo Rački (1828–1894). Of these, the influence was strongest on Vukelić and Pacel.

== See also ==
- Zagreb Philological School
- Zadar Philological School

== Literature ==
- Stolac, Dijana (2019). "Riječka filološka škola". Hrvatska revija (in Croatian). No. 2. Matica hrvatska.
- Turk, Marija (1993-05-01). "Književnojezična koncepcija riječke filološke škole" [Literary-Linguistic Approach of the Rijeka School of Philology]. Croatica: časopis za hrvatski jezik, književnost i kulturu. 23–24 (37–39): 377–386. ISSN 1849-1111.
- Vince, Zlatko (1969-02-01). "Filološke škole 19. stoljeća u razvoju hrvatskoga književnoga jezika" [Philological Schools of the 19th Century in the Development of the Croatian Literary Language]. Jezik: časopis za kulturu hrvatskoga književnog jezika. 16 (3): 65–71. ISSN 0021-6925.
