= Vjekoslav Babukić =

Croatian linguist

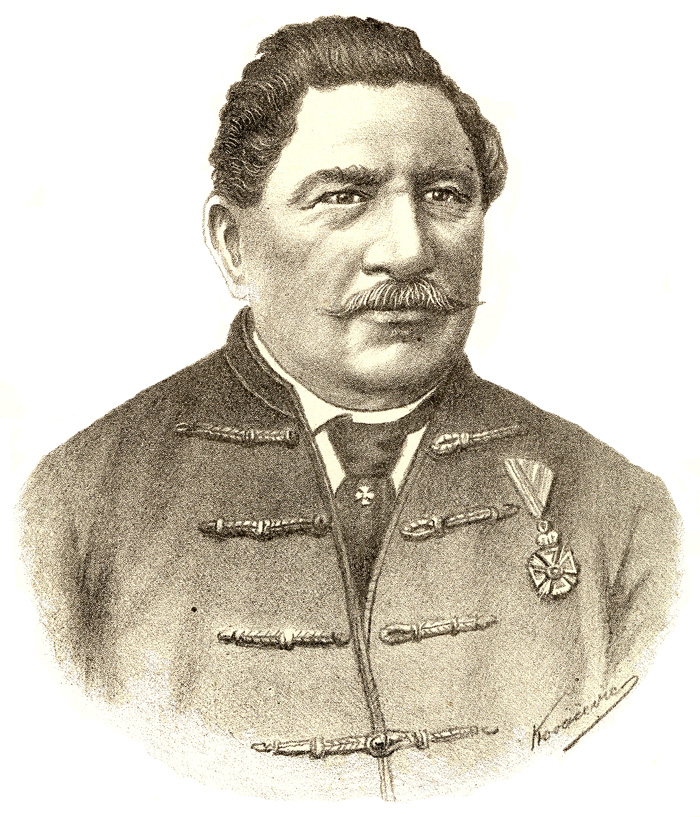
- Born: July 16, 1812; Požega, Kingdom of Slavonia, Austrian Empire
- Died: December 20, 1875 (aged 63); Zagreb, Kingdom of Croatia-Slavonia, Transleithania, Austria-Hungary
- Occupation: Linguist
- Movement: Illyrian movement

Vjekoslav (Alojzije) Babukić (16 July 1812 – 20 December 1875) was a Croatian revivalist and a linguist.

== Biography ==
Babukić was born in Požega. He received a degree in law in 1832 in Zagreb. He was a prominent follower of the Illyrian movement, supporting the programme of cultural unification of South Slavs under Illyrian name. As secretary of the Reading Room (Čitaonica) and Matica ilirska he was connected with prominent individuals in Croatia and other Slavic countries, distributed books and magazines, edited printed editions of older writers (Ivan Gundulić, Andrija Kačić Miošić, Pavao Ritter Vitezović, Junije Palmotić, Ignjat Đurđević, Jerolim Kavanjin) and worked on the establishment of many cultural and scientific institutions. In 1846, he was appointed as the first professor of Croatian at the Zagreb Royal Academy. Following a reorganization of the educational system he taught in a gymnasium since 1850 until his death.

He published several treatises on the Illyrian alphabet and orthography, one poem, and minor contributions and translations in Danica ilirska which he also edited and redacted. In 1836, he published in Danica ilirska his Osnova slovnice slavjanske narěčja ilirskoga ("The Basics of the Slavic Grammar of the Illyrian Dialect"), the first Illyrian grammar which served as a linguistic norm for 50 years and the first Croatian attempt to write a scientific grammar of a language. His second grammar was written in German (Grundzüge der illirischen Sprachlehre), was translated to Italian (Fondamenti della grammatica illirica) and published alongside his Ilirsko-němačko-talianski mali rěčnik ("Illyrian-German-Italian small dictionary"), written by Josip Drobnič. This dictionary Babukić also significantly amended up until the letter O, together with Antun Mažuranić.

The language standardized in Babukić's grammar has a Neoštokavian dialect basis, but also with elements from Čakavian and Kajkavian dialects. He advocated the use of etymological (morphophonological) orthography, as opposed to the strictly phonological orthography advocated by Vuk Karadžić and his followers. Babukić abundantly exploited the existing literary traditions in various dialect for the Illyrian cause. As the first grammarian to realize Illyrian language conceptions, critics such as Vatroslav Jagić have described Babukić as "the first grammarian of the Illyrian dialect".

He died in Zagreb.
