= Božidar Finka =

Croatian linguist (1925–1999)

- Born: 19 December 1925; Sali, Kingdom of Serbs, Croats and Slovenes
- Died: 17 May 1999 (aged 73); Zagreb, Croatia
- Occupation: Linguist
- Scientific career
- Fields: Slavic studies
- Thesis: Dugootočki Čakavski govori (1960)

Božidar Finka (19 December 1925 – 17 May 1999) was a Croatian linguist, lexicographer and member of the Croatian Academy of Sciences and Arts.

== Life and education ==
Božidar Finka was born in Sali on 19 December 1925. In 1947 he finished high school in Split. In 1960, he graduated in Slavic Studies with the dissertation Dugootočki Čakavski govori. Finka spent most of his scientific career working at the Institute of Croatian Language and Linguistics, serving as its director from 1973–77. He was a full member of the Croatian Academy of Sciences and Arts since 1988.

== Works ==
Finka's most significant work was in the fields of Croatian and Slavic dialectology and toponymy. With Stjepan Babić and Milan Moguš, he co-authored Hrvatski pravopis ('Croatian Orthography', 1st ed. 1971).

== Sources ==
- "Božidar Finka (1925–2000)" (PDF). Rasprave (in Croatian). 26 (1). Institute of Croatian Language and Linguistics: 395–403. July 2001.
- Finka, Božidar at enciklopedija.hr (in Croatian)
