= Bogoslav Šulek =

Croatian philologist, historian and lexicographer

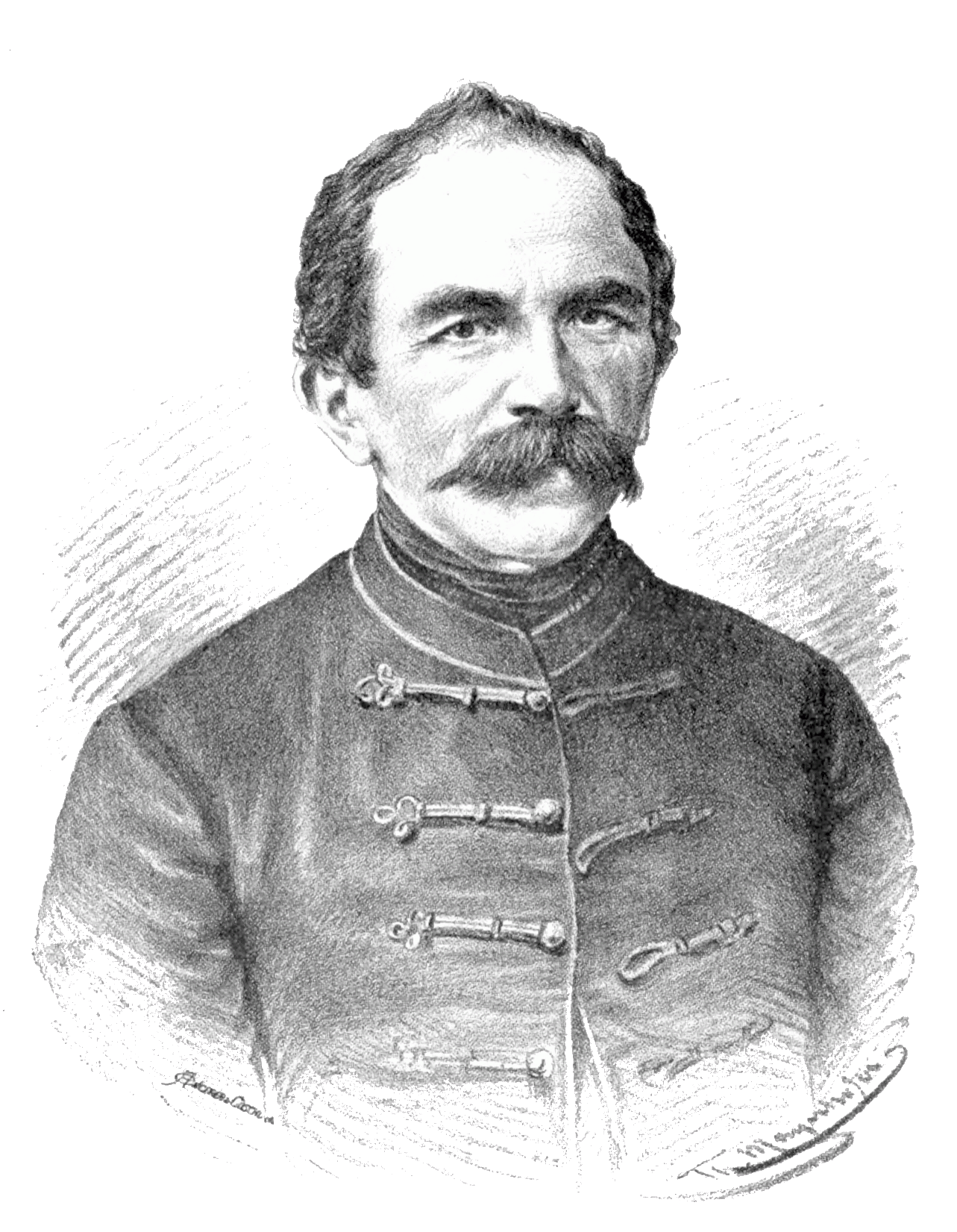
- Šulek, c. 1884
- Born: Bohuslav Šulek; 20 April 1816; Szobotist, Kingdom of Hungary (now Sobotište, Slovakia)
- Died: 30 November 1895 (aged 79); Zagreb, Kingdom of Croatia-Slavonia, Austria-Hungary (now Zagreb, Croatia)
- Resting place: Mirogoj Cemetery, Zagreb, Croatia
- Occupations: philologist, historian, lexicographer
- Known for: Influence on Croatian scientific terminology
- Notable work: Rječnik znanstvenoga nazivlja (Dictionary of Scientific Terminology)

Bogoslav Šulek (born Bohuslav Šulek; April 20, 1816 – November 30, 1895) was a Croatian philologist, historian and lexicographer. He was very influential in creating Croatian terminology in the areas of social and natural sciences, technology and civilization.

== Early career ==
Šulek was born to an ethnic Slovak family. He was born in Sobotište (then known as Szobotist), in the Nyitra County of the Kingdom of Hungary (present-day Slovakia) where he attended primary school. He studied at the evangelical lyceum in Bratislava. He decided not to become a pastor, but was unable to continue his studies in Jena, so he came to his brother in the Croatian town of Brod na Savi in November 1838. Soon thereafter, he made contact with Ljudevit Gaj, the central figure of the Croatian Illyrian movement, and in autumn 1839 started working as a printer for Franjo Župan in Zagreb.

He started writing for Gaj's papers in 1841 and was the editor-in-chief of the illegal paper Branislav, printed in Belgrade, in 1844–45. He was the editor of Gaj's Novine Horvatske, Slavonske i Dalmatinske (Newspaper of Croatia, Slavonia and Dalmatia) from 1846 to 1849, Slavenski jug (Slavic South) in 1849, and Jugoslavenske novine (Yugoslav Newspaper) in 1850. During the 1850s he wrote many textbooks (e.g. Learning to Read, Children's Primer, Natural Sciences for Primary School, Plant Studies for High School etc.). At the same time, he was writing a German-Croatian dictionary. He also wrote against the linguistic policy of the linguist and folklorist Vuk Karadžić. Šulek held pro-Yugoslav views. He died in Zagreb.

Ancestors of Bogoslav Šulek: hu: Schulek család (felvidéki)

== Work ==
From 1858 till 1865, Šulek was the editor of Gospodarski list. He was one of the initiators of Pozor magazine (1867). He was an exceptionally prolific journalist and scientific propagator. In 1868 he issued his most famous political work, Naše pravice. Izbor zakonah, poveljah i spisah, znamenitih za državno pravo kraljevine dalmatinsko-hrvatsko-slavonske od god. 1202 - 1868 (Our Rights. A Selection of Laws, Charters and Documents Important for the State Right of the Kingdom of Dalmatia, Croatia and Slavonia, 1202–1868). He was a member of the Yugoslav Academy of Sciences and Arts and its secretary from 1871 till his death. He was promoted into a doctor of sciences in 1867 on the basis of his study of Ruđer Bošković.

== Influence on Croatian terminology ==
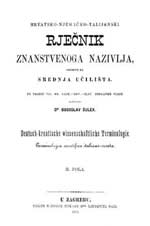
Šulek's Dictionary of Scientific Terminology (1874)

Šulek supported linguistic principles of the Zagreb Philological School and promoted Croatian linguistic purism. For his work he has been described as the "father of Croatian scientific terminology". He liberally coined neologisms and borrowed words from other Slavic languages to serve as replacements for non-Slavic loanwords. When a Shtokavian word for a loanword was not available, he drew upon Chakavian and Kajkavian lexical stock, and when those were insufficient he borrowed words from other Slavic languages such as Czech, Slovak, Russian and Slovene, or proposed his own neologisms. His activities often drew him to conflict with Croatian Vukovians who advocated pure folk language and derisively called his neologisms and borrowings šulekizmi ("Šulekisms").

Despite their initial unpopularity, most of Šulek's new vocabulary slowly entered into common parlance of Croatian upper classes throughout the 20th century; many of these words are nowadays considered standard Croatian expressions for various concepts.

Most of his coinages used in modern Croatian include words in chemistry (kisik "oxygen", vodik "hydrogen", dušik "nitrogen") and other technical fields (plin "gas", plinomjer "gas meter", narječje "dialect", glazba "music", skladba "composition", obrazac "template; form", sustav "system", tlak "pressure", tlakomjer "barometer", zemljovid "map", uzor "role model", pojam "concept", tvrtka "company", uradak "piece of work", zdravstvo "healthcare").

== Works ==
- "Deutsch-kroatisches Worterbuch - Njemačko-ilirski rječnik", I. - II. (Zagreb, 1860) - German-Croatian Dictionary
- "Hrvatsko-njemačko-talijanski rječnik znanstvenoga nazivlja", I. - II. (Zagreb, 1874/75; reprint: Zagreb, 1995) - Croatian-German-Italian Dictionary of Scientific Terms
- "Jugoslavenski imenik bilja", (Zagreb, 1879.) - Yugoslavian Plant Lexicon

== Sources ==
- Bičanić, Ante; Frančić, Anđela; Hudeček, Lana; Mihaljević, Milica (2013), Pregled povijesti, gramatike i pravopisa hrvatskog jezika (in Croatian), Croatica
- "Bogoslav Šulek (Subotište u Slovačkoj, 20. IV.1816 - Zagreb, 30. XI. 1895)" (in Croatian). Archived from the original on 7 August 2011.
- Milčetić, Ivan (1907). "Šulekova pisma I. Trnskom" [Šulek's Letters to I. Trnski]. Građa za povijest književnosti hrvatske (in Serbo-Croatian). 5: 278–292.
