= Tomislav Maretić =

Croatian linguist (1854–1938)

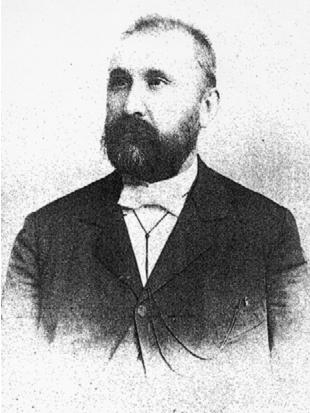
- Born: 13 October 1854; Virovitica, Kingdom of Slavonia, Austrian Empire
- Died: 15 January 1938 (aged 83); Zagreb, Kingdom of Yugoslavia
- Scientific career
- Fields: Linguistics, lexicography
- Institutions: University of Zagreb, Yugoslav Academy of Sciences and Arts

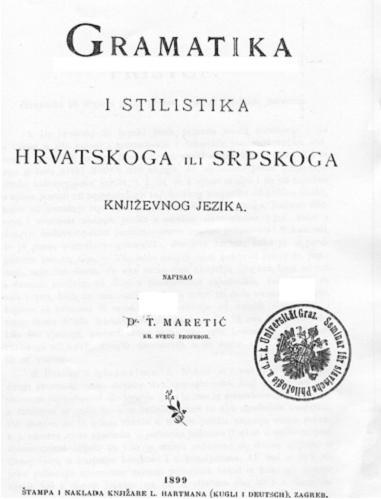
Tomo Maretić: Gramatika i stilistika hrvatskoga ili srpskoga književnog jezika

Tomislav Maretić (13 October 1854 – 15 January 1938) was a Croatian linguist and lexicographer.

== Biography ==
He was born in Virovitica, where he attended primary school and the gymnasium in Varaždin, Požega and Zagreb. He graduated in 1878, receiving a diploma in classical and Slavic philology at the Faculty of Philosophy in Zagreb.

He worked as a high school teacher in Požega from 1879 to 1881 and in Zagreb from 1881 to 1885. He received his doctorate in 1883, and from 1886 taught Slavic philology at the Faculty of Philosophy in Zagreb. That same year, he went on a one-year study stay in Leipzig and Prague. He retired in 1914, but returned to the faculty to teach Indo-European Studies between 1919 and 1924.

In 1890 he became a full member of the Croatian Academy of Sciences and Arts, and served as its president from 1915 to 1918. He was a member of parliament of the Unionist Party twice for five years.

Maretić was a polyglot with a wide education, a prolific linguist, the main representative of the so-called Croatian Vukovars, responsible for the consistent codification of Novoštokavian as a literary language and for the introduction of phonological orthography, advocating for the linguistic unity of Croatian and Serbian.

Maretić's grammar was for most of the 20th century the foundation of the Croatian language norm and the main language manual for generations of pupils and students. Criticized immediately after its publication because it was not based on Croatian literature but mainly on folk songs and works by Vuk Stefanović Karadžić and Đura Daničić, this grammar was, for its time, the most comprehensive description of classical Novoštokavian language.

He died in Zagreb.

== Selected works ==
- Lekcionarij Bernarda Spljećanina, JAZU, 208 pp., Zagreb, 1885
- Nov prilog za istoriju akcentuacije hrvatske ili srpske, JAZU, 225 pp., Zagreb, 1885
- O narodnim imenima i prezimenima u Hrvata i Srba, JAZU, 150 pp., Zagreb, 1886
- Veznici u slovenskijem jezicima, JAZU, 299 pp., Zagreb, 1887
- Slaveni u davnini, Matica hrvatska, 256 pp., Zagreb, 1889
- Kosovski junaci i događaji u narodnoj epici, JAZU, 115 pp., Zagreb, 1889
- Istorija hrvatskoga pravopisa latinskijem slovima, JAZU, 406 pp., Zagreb, 1889
- Slavenski nominalni akcenat s obzirom na litavski, grčki i staroindijski, JAZU, 64 pp., Zagreb,1890
- Život i književni rad Franje Miklošića, JAZU, 113 pp., Zagreb, 1892
- Gramatika hrvatskoga jezika za niže razrede srednjih škola, Kugli, 270 pp., Zagreb, 1899
- Gramatika i stilistika hrvatskoga ili srpskoga književnog jezika, Kugli, 700 pp., Zagreb, 1899
- I. S. Turgenjev u hrvatskim i srpskim prijevodima, JAZU, 113 pp., Zagreb, 1904
- Rječnik hrvatskoga ili srpskoga jezika: edited in multiple occasions more than 5 300 pages
- Metrika narodnih naših pjesama, JAZU, 200 pp., Zagreb, 1907
- Naša narodna epika, JAZU, 263 pp., Zagreb, 1909
- Jezik slavonskijeh pisaca, JAZU, 88 pp., 1910
- Jezik dalmatinskijeh pisaca XVIII. vijeka, JAZU, 92 pp., Zagreb, 1916
- Hrvatski ili srpski «jezični savjetnik», Jugoslavenska njiva, 509 pp., Zagreb, 1923
- Metrika muslimanske narodne epike, JAZU, 138 pp., Zagreb, 1936

Academic offices
Preceded by Tadija Smičiklas	Chairman of the Yugoslav Academy of Sciences and Arts; 1915–1918	Succeeded by Vladimir Mažuranić
