= Antun Mažuranić =

Croatian linguist (1805–1888)

Antun Mažuranić (Novi Vinodolski, 13 June 1805 – 18 December 1888, Zagreb) was a Croatian writer and linguist, brother of Croatian Ban Ivan Mažuranić and writer Matija Mažuranić.

He was an active participant of the Illyrian movement and one of the founders of Matica ilirska. He edited the journal Danica ilirska. Among his works as a grammarian and lexicographer, the most important is the critical edition of the Law codex of Vinodol.

== Selected works ==
- Temelji ilirskoga i latinskoga jezika za početnike (1839)
- Ilirsko-němačko-talianski mali rěčnik, I–III (1846–1849)
- Slovnica Hèrvatska (1859, ^{2}1861, ^{3}1866, ^{4}1869)
- O važnosti accenta hérvatskogo za historiu Slavjanah (1860)
