= Croatian language =

Standard variety of Serbo-Croatian

Croatian
- hrvatski
- Pronunciation: [xř̩ʋaːtskiː]
- Native to: Croatia, Bosnia and Herzegovina, Hungary (Bácska), Montenegro (Bay of Kotor), Romania (Caraș-Severin County), Serbia (Vojvodina)
- Region: Southeast Europe
- Ethnicity: Croats
- Speakers: L1: 5.1 million (2021–2023); L2: 1.3 million (2012)
- Language family: Indo-European: Balto-Slavic; Slavic; South; Western; Serbo-Croatian; Croatian
- Writing system: Latin (Gaj's alphabet); Yugoslav Braille; Glagolitic (historical); Bosnian Cyrillic (historical)

Official status
- Official language in: Croatia; Bosnia and Herzegovina (Note: Although Bosnia and Herzegovina does not have an official language at the state level, Croatian has been designated as an official language in its entities: the Federation of Bosnia and Herzegovina and Republika Srpska.); Montenegro (co-official); Serbia (in Vojvodina); Austria (in Burgenland); European Union
- Recognised minority language in: Slovakia; Czech Republic; Hungary (in Baranya County); Italy
- Regulated by: Institute of Croatian Language and Linguistics

Language codes
- ISO 639-1: hr
- ISO 639-2: hrv
- ISO 639-3: hrv
- Glottolog: croa1245
- Linguasphere: part of 53-AAA-g
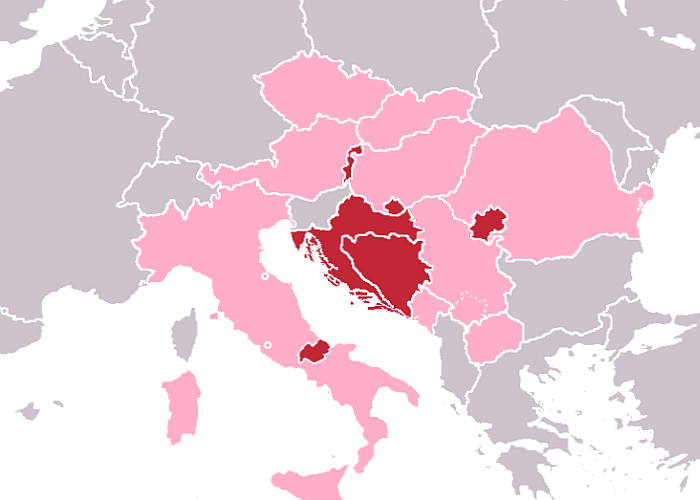
- States and regions which recognize Croatian as (co-)official (dark red) or minority language (light red)

- Croatian is not endangered according to the classification system of the UNESCO Atlas of the World's Languages in Danger

Croatian (Note: /kroʊˈeɪʃən/; hrvatski [xř̩ʋaːtskiː]) is the standard variety of the Serbo-Croatian language mainly used by Croats. It is the national official language and literary standard of Croatia, one of the official languages of Bosnia and Herzegovina, Montenegro, the Serbian province of Vojvodina, the European Union and a recognized minority language elsewhere in Serbia and other neighbouring countries.

In the mid-18th century, the first attempts to provide a Croatian literary standard began on the basis of the Neo-Shtokavian dialect that served as a supraregional lingua franca – pushing back regional Chakavian, Kajkavian, and Shtokavian vernaculars. The decisive role was played by Croatian Vukovians, who cemented the usage of Ijekavian Neo-Shtokavian as the literary standard in the late 19th and the beginning of the 20th century, in addition to designing a phonological orthography. Croatian is written in Gaj's Latin alphabet.

Besides the Shtokavian dialect, on which Standard Croatian is based, there are two other main supradialects spoken in Croatia, Chakavian and Kajkavian. These supradialects, and the four national standards – Bosnian, Croatian, Montenegrin and Serbian – are usually subsumed under the term "Serbo-Croatian" in English; this term is controversial for native speakers, and names such as "Bosnian-Croatian-Montenegrin-Serbian" (BCMS) are used by linguists and philologists in the 21st century.

== History ==
=== Modern language and standardization ===
In the late medieval period up to the 17th century, the majority of semi-autonomous Croatia was ruled by two domestic dynasties of princes (banovi), the Zrinski and the Frankopan, which were linked by inter-marriage. Toward the 17th century, both of them attempted to unify Croatia both culturally and linguistically, writing in a mixture of all three principal dialects (Chakavian, Kajkavian and Shtokavian), and calling it "Croatian", "Dalmatian", or "Slavonian". Historically, several other names were used as synonyms for Croatian, in addition to Dalmatian and Slavonian, and these were Illyrian (ilirski) and Slavic (slovinski). It is still used now in parts of Istria, which became a crossroads of various mixtures of Chakavian with Ekavian, Ijekavian and Ikavian isoglosses.

The most standardised form (Kajkavian–Ikavian) became the cultivated language of administration and intellectuals from the Istrian peninsula along the Croatian coast, across central Croatia up into the northern valleys of the Drava and the Mura. The cultural apex of this 17th century idiom is represented by the editions of "Adrianskoga mora sirena" ("The Siren of the Adriatic Sea") by Petar Zrinski and "Putni tovaruš" ("Traveling escort") by Katarina Zrinska.

However, this first linguistic renaissance in Croatia was halted by the political execution of Petar Zrinski and Fran Krsto Frankopan by the Holy Roman Emperor Leopold I in Vienna in 1671. Subsequently, the Croatian elite in the 18th century gradually abandoned this combined Croatian standard.

=== Illyrian period ===
The Illyrian movement was a 19th-century pan-South Slavic political and cultural movement in Croatia that had the goal to standardise the regionally differentiated and orthographically inconsistent literary languages in Croatia, and finally merge them into a common South Slavic literary language. Specifically, three major groups of dialects were spoken on Croatian territory, and there had been several literary languages over four centuries. The leader of the Illyrian movement Ljudevit Gaj standardized the Latin alphabet in 1830–1850 and worked to bring about a standardized orthography. Although based in Kajkavian-speaking Zagreb, Gaj supported using the more populous Neo-Shtokavian – a version of Shtokavian that eventually became the predominant dialectal basis of both Croatian and Serbian literary language from the 19th century on. Supported by various South Slavic proponents, Neo-Shtokavian was adopted after an Austrian initiative at the Vienna Literary Agreement of 1850, laying the foundation for the unified Serbo-Croatian literary language. The uniform Neo-Shtokavian then became common in the Croatian elite.

In the 1860s, the Zagreb Philological School dominated the Croatian cultural life, drawing upon linguistic and ideological conceptions advocated by the members of the Illyrian movement. While it was dominant over the rival Rijeka Philological School and Zadar Philological Schools, its influence waned with the rise of the Croatian Vukovians (at the end of the 19th century).

== Distinguishing features and differences between standards ==
Croatian is commonly characterized by the ijekavian pronunciation (see an explanation of yat reflexes), the sole use of the Latin alphabet, and a number of lexical differences in common words that set it apart from standard Serbian. Some differences are absolute, while some appear mainly in the frequency of use. However, as professor John F. Bailyn states, "an examination of all the major 'levels' of language shows that BCS is clearly a single language with a single grammatical system."

== Sociopolitical standpoints ==
Croatian, although technically a form of Serbo-Croatian, is sometimes considered a distinct language by itself. This is at odds with purely linguistic classifications of languages based on mutual intelligibility (abstand and ausbau languages), which do not allow varieties that are mutually intelligible to be considered separate languages. "There is no doubt of the near 100% mutual intelligibility of (standard) Croatian and (standard) Serbian, as is obvious from the ability of all groups to enjoy each others' films, TV and sports broadcasts, newspapers, rock lyrics etc.", writes Bailyn. Differences between various standard forms of Serbo-Croatian are often exaggerated for political reasons. Most Croatian linguists regard Croatian as a separate language that is considered key to national identity, in the sense that the term Croatian language includes all language forms from the earliest times to the present, in all areas where Croats live, as realized in the speeches of Croatian dialects, in city speeches and jargons, and in the Croatian standard language. The issue is sensitive in Croatia as the notion of a separate language being the most important characteristic of a nation is widely accepted, stemming from the 19th-century history of Europe. The 1967 Declaration on the Status and Name of the Croatian Literary Language, in which a group of Croatian authors and linguists demanded greater autonomy for Croatian, is viewed in Croatia as a linguistic policy milestone that was also a general milestone in national politics.

On the 50th anniversary of the Declaration, at the beginning of 2017, a two-day meeting of linguists, writers, journalists and artists from Croatia, Bosnia-Herzegovina, Serbia and Montenegro was organized in Zagreb, at which the text of the Declaration on the Common Language of Croats, Bosniaks, Serbs and Montenegrins was drafted. The new Declaration has received more than ten thousand signatures (not only of intellectuals, but also commonpeople). It stated that in Croatia, Serbia, Bosnia-Herzegovina and Montenegro a common polycentric standard language is used, consisting of several standard varieties, similar to the existing varieties of German, English or Spanish. The aim of the new Declaration was to "stimulate discussion on language without the nationalistic baggage" and to "counter nationalistic divisions".

The terms "Serbo-Croatian", "Serbo-Croat", or "Croato-Serbian", are still used as a cover term for all these forms by foreign scholars, even though the speakers themselves largely do not use it. Within Southeastern Europe, the term has largely been replaced by the ethnopolitical terms Bosnian, Croatian, Montenegrin, and Serbian.

The use of the name "Croatian" for a language has historically been attested to, though not always distinctively. The first printed Croatian literary work is a vernacular Chakavian poem written in 1501 by Marko Marulić, titled "The History of the Holy Widow Judith Composed in Croatian Verses". The Croatian–Hungarian Agreement designated Croatian as one of its official languages. Croatian became an official EU language upon accession of Croatia to the European Union on 1 July 2013. In 2013, the EU started publishing a Croatian-language version of its official gazette.

== Official status ==
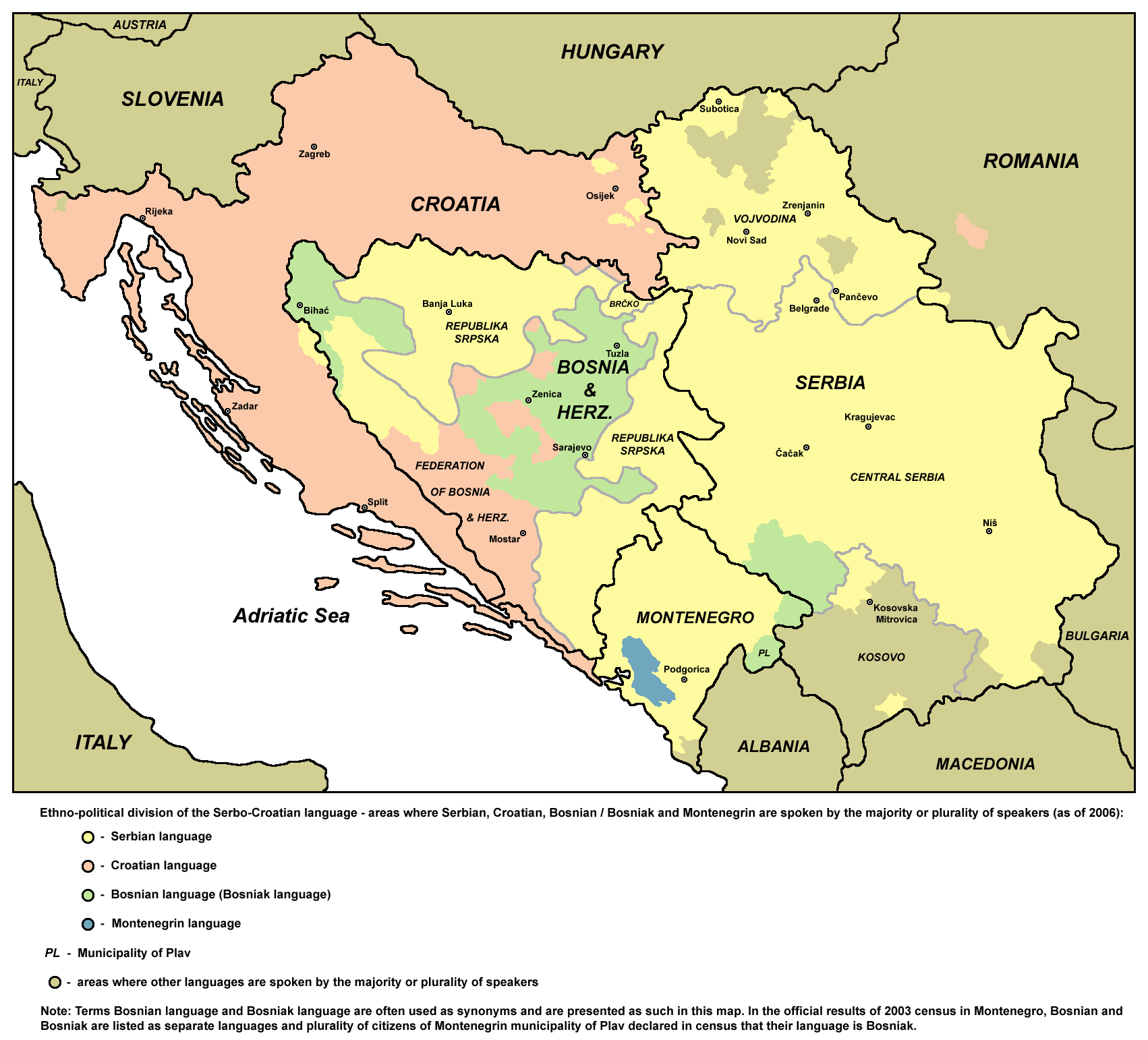
Areas with an ethnic Croatian majority (as of 2006)

Standard Croatian is the official language of the Republic of Croatia and, along with Standard Bosnian and Standard Serbian, one of three official languages of Bosnia and Herzegovina. It is also official in the regions of Burgenland (Austria), Molise (Italy) and Vojvodina (Serbia). Additionally, it has co-official status alongside Romanian in the communes of Carașova and Lupac, Romania. In these localities, Croats or Krashovani make up the majority of the population, and education, signage and access to public administration and the justice system are provided in Croatian, alongside Romanian.

=== Higher education ===
Croatian is officially used and taught at all universities in Croatia and at the University of Mostar in Bosnia and Herzegovina. Studies of Croatian language are held in Hungary (Institute of Philosophy at the ELTE Faculty of Humanities in Budapest), Slovakia (Faculty of Philosophy of the Comenius University in Bratislava), Poland (University of Warsaw, Jagiellonian University, University of Silesia in Katowice, University of Wroclaw, Adam Mickiewicz University in Poznan), Germany (University of Regensburg), Australia (Center for Croatian Studies at the Macquarie University), New Zealand (University of Auckland), North Macedonia (Faculty of Philology in Skopje) etc.

==== Language tutoring ====
The procedure for selecting Croatian language tutors (lektori), in accordance with signed interstate agreements, is carried out by the Ministry of Science, Education and Youth; In addition to teaching, lecturers of the Croatian language and literature also organize lectures by guest lecturers, professors from Croatian universities, writers, directors and other cultural and public figures, and for the purpose of promoting the Croatian language and culture, they organize theatrical performances, Croatian film evenings, cultural days, literary meetings, translation, publishing magazines and other activities that stimulate students' interest in learning the Croatian language. The Ministry is responsible for 34 official exchange teaching centers for Croatian language and literature and three centers for Croatian studies in Australia, Canada and the United Kingdom, which it co-finances. In addition to the aforementioned teaching centers and centers, which include more than 2,000 students in 25 countries, the Ministry fully or partially supports another 40 independent teaching centers that are not under its jurisdiction. The Ministry awards one-semester scholarships to students of the teaching staff for improving their Croatian language skills at Croaticum of the Faculty of Philosophy in Zagreb, the Center for Croatian Studies in the World at the Faculty of Philosophy in Split, and the same faculty in Rijeka. In addition to one-semester scholarships, the Ministry also awards scholarships for shorter scientific stays for the purpose of studying literature, researching, or consulting with professors related to the preparation of scientific papers in the field of Croatian studies.

Croatian embassies hold courses for learning Croatian in Poland, United Kingdom and a few other countries. Extracurricular education of Croatian is held in Germany in Baden-Württemberg, Berlin, Hamburg and Saarland, as well as in North Macedonia in Skopje, Bitola, Štip and Kumanovo. Some Croatian Catholic Missions also hold Croatian language courses (e.g., CCM in Buenos Aires).

=== Language regulation ===
There is no regulatory body that determines the proper usage of Croatian. However, in January 2023, the Croatian Parliament passed a law that prescribes the official use of the Croatian language, regulates the establishment of the Council for the Croatian language as a coordinating advisory body whose work will be focused on the protection and development of the Croatian language. State authorities, local and regional self-government entities are obliged to use the Croatian language.

The current standard language is generally laid out in the grammar books and dictionaries used in education, such as the school curriculum prescribed by the Ministry of Education and the university programmes of the Faculty of Philosophy at the four main universities. In 2013, a Hrvatski pravopis by the Institute of Croatian Language and Linguistics received an official sole seal of approval from the Ministry of Education.

The most prominent recent editions describing the Croatian standard language are:

- Hrvatski pravopis by the Institute of Croatian Language and Linguistics, available online
- Hrvatski jezični portal by University Computing Centre (Srce) and Znanje, available online.
- Rječnik hrvatskoga jezika by Vladimir Anić
- Rječnik hrvatskoga jezika by Jure Šonje et al.
- Hrvatski enciklopedijski rječnik, by a group of authors
- Hrvatska gramatika by Eugenija Barić et al.

Also notable are the recommendations of Matica hrvatska, the national publisher and promoter of Croatian heritage, and the Miroslav Krleža Institute of Lexicography, as well as the Croatian Academy of Sciences and Arts.

Numerous representative Croatian linguistic works were published since the independence of Croatia, among them three voluminous monolingual dictionaries of contemporary Croatian.

In 2021, Croatia introduced a new model of linguistic categorisation of the Bunjevac dialect (as part of New-Shtokavian Ikavian dialects of the Shtokavian dialect of the Croatian language) in three sub-branches: Dalmatian (also called Bosnian-Dalmatian), Danubian (also called Bunjevac), and Littoral-Lika. Its speakers largely use the Latin alphabet and are living in parts of Bosnia and Herzegovina, different parts of Croatia, southern parts (inc. Budapest) of Hungary as well in the autonomous province Vojvodina of Serbia. The Institute of Croatian Language and Linguistics added the Bunjevac dialect to the List of Protected Intangible Cultural Heritage of the Republic of Croatia on 8 October 2021.

=== Online resources ===
The Central State Office for Croats Abroad and the Zagreb Faculty of Philosophy have developed web and mobile application LearnCro for learning the Croatian language, available in English and Spanish which includes 80 interactive teaching units, gamification, cultural content, the ability to work offline and professional support, available via the Google Play and Apple App Store.

Central State Office also organizes online language courses, developed by Croaticum, language centre of the Faculty of Philosophy in Zagreb. The A1 level course was attended by almost 37,000 students from 130 countries in eight years (2018-2025); the most participants came from the United States, Brazil, Argentina, Canada and Australia, all countries with historical Croatian diaspora. The A2 level course was attended by 3,000 students from 96 countries over seven years (2019-2025).

== Sample text ==
Article 1 of the Universal Declaration of Human Rights in Croatian (2009 Croatian government official translation):

Sva ljudska bića rađaju se slobodna i jednaka u dostojanstvu i pravima. Ona su obdarena razumom i sviješću te trebaju jedna prema drugima postupati u duhu bratstva.

Article 1 of the Universal Declaration of Human Rights in English:

All human beings are born free and equal in dignity and rights. They are endowed with reason and conscience and should act towards one another in a spirit of brotherhood.

== See also ==
- Bunjevac dialect
- Croatian Language Corpus
- Croatian Language Days
- Declaration on the Common Language
- Dialects of Serbo-Croatian
- Gaj's Latin alphabet
- Language secessionism in Serbo-Croatian
- Mutual intelligibility
- Pluricentric Serbo-Croatian language

== Sources ==
- Bičanić, Ante; Frančić, Anđela; Hudeček, Lana; Mihaljević, Milica (2013), Pregled povijesti, gramatike i pravopisa hrvatskog jezika (in Croatian), Croatica
- Corbett, Greville; Browne, Wayles (2009). "Serbo-Croat – Bosnian, Croatian, Montenegrin, Serbian". In Comrie, Bernard (ed.). The World's Major Languages. Routledge. ISBN 9781134261567.
- Stokes, Gale (2008). Yugoslavia: Oblique Insights and Observations. University of Pittsburgh Pre. ISBN 9780822973492.
- Šute, Ivica (April 1999). "Deklaracija o nazivu i položaju hrvatskog književnog jezika – Građa za povijest Deklaracije, Zagreb, 1997, str. 225" [Declaration on the Status and Name of the Croatian Standard Language – Declaration History Articles, Zagreb, 1997, p. 225]. Radovi Zavoda Za Hrvatsku Povijest (in Croatian). 31 (1): 317–318. ISSN 0353-295X.
- "SOS ili tek alibi za nasilje nad jezikom" [SOS, or nothing but an alibi for violence against language] (in Croatian). Zagreb: Forum. 16 March 2012. pp. 38–39. ISSN 1848-204X. CROSBI 578565. Archived from the original on 21 December 2012.
