= List of Croatian grammar books =

This article lists Croatian-language grammar books. The enumerated grammar books give a description and prescription of Croatian as it evolved throughout history.

== Croatian grammars before the 20th century ==
Year	Author	Work	Notes
1604	Bartol Kašić	Institutionum linguae illyricae libri duo	The first complete Croatian grammar describing 'Illyrian', a supradialectal form of Ikavian Štokavian with Čakavian admixture. Published in Rome in 2 volumes, written in Latin. Served as a basis for later grammarians up to Appendini.
1639	Rajmund Zamanja	Nauk za dobro pisati latinskijem slovima riječi jezika slovinskoga (How to spell slavic words in Latin characters)	(complicated spelling solutions)
1649	Jakov Mikalja	Grammatika talianska ukratko illi kratak nauk za naucitti latinski (A short Italian grammar or short instructions on how to master Latin)	Loreto – Ancona 1649–1651. An Italian grammar, written in the language which is the ancestor of Croatian (also containing a dictionary). Has some bits and pieces on Croatian too.
1665	Juraj Križanić	Gramatíčno iskazánje ob rúskom jezíku (A grammatical outline of the Russian language)	MS., Tobolsk, 1665. Published: Moscow 1848, Zagreb 1984.. An attempt to write Pan-Slavic grammar based on the data of all the Slavic languages which were known to the author. Characteristics of one of the Croatian literary languages (the so-called ozaljaski književni krug, Ozalj literary circle) were marked, that was characterised by the mixture of Čakavian, Kajkavian and Štokavian traits, so this grammar can be considered a codification of that literary idiom.
1713	Lovro Šitović	Grammatica Latino-Illyrica	Venice 1713^{1}, 1742^{2}, 1782^{3}. Republished: Ljubuški – Zagreb – Sarajevo 2003.
1728	Ardelio della Bella	Instruzioni grammaticali della lingua illirica	In his Dizionario italiano, latino, ilirico, written in Italian, published in Venice, 1728^{1}, Dubrovnik, 1785^{2}; as a standalone work: Principi elemetari della grammatica illirica, Dubrovnik, 1837^{3}; republished in Zagreb, 2006. Grammar is generally based on Kašić's, but has introduced several improvements. The distinction is made between the definite and indefinite adjectives, as well as the declension of adjectives and the pronouns and numerals. Della Bella tries to achieve a unified orthography, and provides marks of three types of accents (acute, grave and circumflex), and rules governing their distribution.
1761	Blaž Tadijanović	Svašta po malo iliti kratko složenje imena i riči u ilirski i njemački jezik (Miscellany, or a short Illyrian and German grammar)	
1767	Matija Antun Relković	Nova slavonska i nimačka gramatika (A new Slavonian and German grammar)	
1778	Marijan Lanosović	Neue Einleitung zur slavonischen Sprache (A new Introduction to the Slavonic Language)	Published in Osijek. With a "Slavonian Dictionary" at the end.
1779	Unknown author	Kratki navuk za pravopiszanye horvatzko	Published in Buda, offers Kajkavian dialect of Croatian as a standard language.
1793	Josip Jurin	Grammatica Illyricae iuventuti Latino Italoque sermone instruendae accomodata (English title needed)	Published in Venice.
1803	Josip Voltiggi Istranin	Grammatica illirica (Illyrian Grammar)	In Ricoslovnik illiricskoga, italianskoga i nimacskoga jezika s’ jednom pridpostavljenomm grammatikom illi pismenstvom: sve ovo sabrano i sloxeno (A dictionary of the Illyrian, Italian and German languages with a grammar and orthography), published in Vienna
1808	Francesco Maria Appendini	Grammatica della lingua Illirica (Grammar of the Illyrian language)	The grammar points to the supra-regional character of the neo—Štokavian dialect which replaced the former Čakavian and Štokavian literary idioms in southern provinces. Published in Dubrovnik.
1812	Šime Starčević	Nova ričoslovnica ilirička (A new Illyrian grammar)	An attempt to come closer to the vernacular by describing the language of folk proverbs; the four—accent system of the Ikavian accent of the Štokavian dialect was described for the first time; published in Triest.
1833	Ignjat Alojzije Brlić	Grammatik der illyrischen Sprache (Grammar of the Illyrian language)	Published in Buda.
1836	Vjekoslav Babukić	Osnova slovnice slavjanske narječja ilirskoga (Foundations of the Slavic grammar of the Illyrian dialect)	First published in Danica ilirska.
1839	Antun Mažuranić	Temelji ilirskoga i latinskoga jezika za početnike (Foundations of the Illyrian and Latin languages)	Published in Zagreb.
1843	Ilija Rukavina Ljubački	Abanderungs — und Abwandlungs: Formen nebst den Regeln der Aussprache und Rechtschreibung (Changes and modifications. Forms, together with the rules of the discussion and orthography.)	Published in Trieste.
1847	Lavoslav Furholzer	Horvatsko-slavonska slovnica za početnike (A Croatian-Slavonian grammar for beginners)	Published in Varaždin.
1850	Rudolf Froehlich	Theoretische-praktische Taschen-Grammatik der illirischen Sprache (Theoretical-practical Pocket Grammar of the Illyrian Language)	Published in Vienna.
1850	Andrija Stazić	Grammatica della lingua illirica ad uso degli amatori nazionali e stranieri che bramano d’impararla (Grammar of the Illirian language for the use of nationals and foreign amateurs who wish to speak it)	Published in Zadar.
1850	Jerolim Sutina / Girolamo Suttina	Principi di grammatica illirica esposti da Girolamo Suttina (Principles of Illyrian grammar, espoused by Girolamo Suttina)	In Vocaboli di prima necessita (English translation needed) published in Zadar.
1851	Andrija Stazić	Slovnica serbsko—ilirskoga jezika za decu u Dalmaciji i u druzih deržavah jugoslavjanskih (A grammar of the Serbian—Illyrian language for children in Dalmatia and other Southern Slavic countries)	Published in Split .
1852	Fran Kurelac	Kako da sklanjamo imena ili greške hrvatskih pisaca glede sklonovanja 2—A padeža množine (How to decline nouns, or mistakes of Croatian writers with respect to the second case plural)	
1854	Andrija Torkvat Brlić	Grammatik der illyrischen Sprache (Grammar of the Illyrian language)	Published in Vienna.
1854	Fran Volarić	Ilirska slovnica / sastavi Věkoslav Babukić	Printed in Zagreb, in a printing press of Ljudevit Gaj.
1836	Vjekoslav Babukić	Osnova slovnice slavjanske narječja ilirskoga (Foundations of the Slavic grammar of the Illyrian dialect)	First published in Danica ilirska.
1855	Ivan Danilo	Grammatica della lingua illirica (Grammar of the Illyrian language)	Published in Zadar.
1855	Andrija Stazić	Grammatica illirica pratica secondo il metodo di Ahne di Ollendorff (Practical Illyrian grammar according to the method of Ahne di Ollendorff)	Published in Split.
1859	Antun Mažuranić	Slovnica hervatska (A Croatian grammar)	
1859	Adolfo Veber Tkalčević	Skladnja ilirskoga jezika za niže gimnazije (Syntax of the Illyrian language for secondary schools)	Published in Vienna.
1860	Vinko Pacel	Slovnica jezika Hrvatskoga ili Srbskoga (A grammar of the Croatian or Serbian language)	Published in Zagreb.
1862	Adolfo Veber Tkalčević	Slovnica za četvrti razred katoličkih glavnih učionah u Carevini austrijanskoj (A grammar for the fourth class of Catholic schools in the Austrian Empire)	Published in Vienna.
1864	Vatroslav Jagić	Gramatika jezika hervackoga (A Grammar of Croatian)	Published in Zagreb.
1865	Vinko Pacel	Oblici književne hrvaštine (Forms of the Croatian literary heritage)	Published in Karlovac.
1867	Pero Budmani	Grammatica della lingua serbo—croata (Grammar of Serbo-Croatian)	First use of the term "Serbo—Croatian" in a title of a grammar book.
1869	Paul Pierre	Abrege de grammaire francaise—croate et de dictionnaire francais—croate Summary of French-Croatian Grammar and French-Croatian Dictionary	Published in Zagreb.
1871	Adolfo Veber Tkalčević	Slovnica hervatska za srednja učilišta (A Croatian grammar for secondary schools)	Published in Zagreb.
1873	Ivan Danilo	Slovnica za srednja učilišta nižega reda (A grammar for lower secondary schools)	Published in Zadar.
1873	Dragutin Parčić	Grammatica della lingua slava (illirica) (Grammar of the Slavic (Illyrian) Language)	"Compiled by P. Carlo A. Parčić." Published in Zadar.
1879	Mirko Divković	Hrvatske gramatike I. dio. Oblici. (Croatian grammar. Part I. Forms)	
1880	Mirko Divković	Nauka o izreci (Sentence grammar)	
1880	Josip Vitanović	Gramatika hrvatskoga jezika (Grammar of Croatian)	
1881	Mirko Divković	Hrvatske gramatike II. dio. Sintaksa za školu (Croatian grammar. Part II. Syntax for schools)	
1893	Rudolf Strohal	Hrvatska slovnica (Croatian grammar)	
1899	Tomislav Maretić	Gramatika i stilistika hrvatskoga ili srpskog jezika (Grammar and stylistics of the Croatian or Serbian language)	

== Croatian grammars in the 20th century ==
Year	Author	Work	Notes
1903	Mirko Divković	Oblici i sintaksa hrvatskoga jezika za srednje škole (Forms and Syntax of Croatian for Schools)	2nd ed 1908
1905	Josip Florschütz	Gramatika hrvatskog jezika za ženski licej, preparandije i više pučke škole (Grammar of Croatian ...)	editions 1907, 1916, 1921, 1940, 1941, 1943, 1950, reprint 2002.
1916	Milan Rešetar	Elementar-Grammatik der kroatischen (serbischen) Sprache (Basic Grammar of Croatian (Serbian))	
1944	Blaž Jurišić	Nacrt hrvatske slovnice. I. Glasovi i oblici u poviestnom razvoju	
1952	Ivan Brabec - Mate Hraste - Sreten Živković	Gramatika hrvatskoga ili srpskoga jezika (Grammar of Croatian or Serbian language)	
1956	Vilim Frančić	Gramatyka opisowa języka serbochorwackiego (Descriptive grammar of Serbocroatian language)	2nd edition 1963
1966	Stjepko Težak - Stjepan Babić	Pregled gramatike hrvatskosrpskog jezika (Overview of grammar of Croatoserbian language)	same book reprinted in 2003. as Gramatika hrvatskoga jezika - priručnik za osnovno jezično obrazovanje - (Grammar of Croatian: Handbook for Elementary Language Education)
1967	Josip Hamm	Kratka gramatika hrvatskosrpskog književnog jezika za strance	translated in German in 1967 as Grammatik der serbokroatischen Sprache
1971	Slavko Pavešić - Zlatko Vince	Gramatika, u: Jezični savjetnik s gramatikom	
1979	Eugenija Barić - Mijo Lončarić - Dragica Malić - Slavko Pavešić - Mirko Peti - Vesna Zečević - Marija Znika	Priručna gramatika hrvatskoga književnog jezika	reprinted as Gramatika hrvatskoga književnog jezika 1990, and Hrvatska gramatika 1995, 1997, 2003, 2005
1986	Stjepan Babić	Tvorba riječi u hrvatskom književnom jeziku. Nacrt za gramatiku (Word Formation in Standard Croatian. Design for Grammar)	2nd edition 1991, 3rd edition 2002
1986	Radoslav Katičić	Sintaksa hrvatskoga književnog jezika. Nacrt za gramatiku	2nd edition 1991, 3rd edition 2002
1991	Stjepan Babić - Dalibor Brozović - Milan Moguš - Slavko Pavešić - Ivo Škarić - Stjepan Težak	Povijesni pregled, glasovi i oblici hrvatskoga književnog jezika. Nacrti za gramatiku	
1997	Dragutin Raguž	Praktična hrvatska gramatika (Practical Croatian Grammar)	2nd edition 2010 as Gramatika hrvatskoga jezika
1997	Snježana Kordić	Kroatisch-Serbisch (Croatian-Serbian)	2nd edition 2004; same grammar translated in English in 1997 (see Contents), 2nd English edition 2006
2002	Sanda Ham	Školska gramatika hrvatskoga jezika School Grammar of Croatian Language	
2005	Josip Silić – Ivo Pranjković	Gramatika hrvatskoga jezika Grammar of Croatian Language	2nd edition 2007
2007	Stjepan Vukušić – Ivan Zoričić – Marija Grasselli-Vukušić	Naglasak u hrvatskome književnom jeziku Accent in Literary Croatian Language	
2017	Lana Hudeček – Milica Mihaljević	Hrvatska školska gramatika School Grammar of Croatian Language	
