= Grammar book =

Reference book on grammar

A grammar book is a book or treatise describing the grammar of one or more languages. In linguistics, such a book is itself frequently referred to as a grammar.

== Etymology ==
Ancient Greek had the term τέκνή γραμματική (téchnē grammatikḗ, 'skill in the use of letters'), which was adapted into Latin as ars grammatica. This term was used in the title of works about writing and language, which came to be known in English as grammar-books or grammars.

== Definition ==
Although the style and content of grammar-books varies enormously, they generally aim for a fairly systematic and comprehensive survey of one language's phonetics, morphology, syntax and word-formation. Since languages vary across time, space, social groups, genres, and so forth, grammars inevitably cannot represent every single aspect of a language, but usually select a particular variety with a view to a particular readership.

The readerships of grammars and their needs vary widely. Grammars may be intended for native-speakers of a language or for learners. Many grammars are written for use by children learning a language in a school environment. Many grammars are reference grammars, intended not to be read from beginning to end like a textbook, but to enable readers to check particular details as the need arises. Some grammars are prescriptive, aiming to tell readers how they ought to use language; others are descriptive, aiming to tell readers how language is used in reality. In either case, popular grammars can be enormously influential on language-use.

== History ==
The earliest known descriptive linguistic writing, leading to early grammar-books, took place in a Sanskrit community in northern India; the best known scholar of that linguistic tradition was Pāṇini, whose works are commonly dated to around the 5th century BCE. The earliest known grammar of a Western language is the second-century BCE Art of Grammar attributed to Dionysius Thrax, a grammar of Greek.

Key stages in the history of English grammars include Ælfric of Eynsham's composition around 995 CE of a grammar in Old English based on a compilation of two Latin grammars, Aelius Donatus's Ars maior and Priscian's Institutiones grammaticae. This was intended for use by English-speaking students of Latin, and is the first known grammar of Latin written in a vernacular language, but was arguably also intended to use Latin as a basis for explaining English grammar. A key step in the development of English grammars was the 1586 publication of William Bullokar's published his Pamphlet for Grammar, which used a framework derived from Latin grammars to show how English too had grammatical structures and rules. Numerous grammars aimed at foreign learners of English, sometimes written in Latin, were published in the seventeenth century, while the eighteenth saw the emergence of English-language grammars aiming to instruct their Anglophone audiences in what the authors viewed as correct grammar, including an increasingly literate audience of women and children; this trend continued into the early twentieth century. A key shift in grammar-writing is represented by Charles Carpenter Fries' 1952 The Structure of English, which aimed to give up-to-date, descriptive rather than prescriptive, information on English grammar, and drew on recordings of live speech to inform its claims.

== List of first printed grammars (1450–1800) ==
Year	Language	Author	Notes
1451	Latin	Aelius Donatus	Donatus' Ars Minor was the first printed book by Johannes Gutenberg.
1471	Ancient Greek	Manuel Chrysoloras	Chrysoloras' Erotemata was the first printed book in greek language.
1489	Hebrew	Moses Kimhi	
1492	Spanish	Antonio de Nebrija	Nebrija's Gramática de la lengua castellana is the first printed grammar of a vernacular language.
1505	Andalusi Arabic	Pedro de Alcalá	
1516	Italian	Giovanni Francesco Fortunio	
1527	Biblical Aramaic	Sebastian Münster	
1530	French	John Palsgrave	
1533	Czech	Beneš Optát	
1534	German	Valentin Ickelsamer	
1536	Portuguese	Fernão de Oliveira	
1539	Hungarian	János Sylvester	
1539	Classical Arabic	Guillaume Postel	
1539	Syriac	Teseo Ambrogio	written in collaboration with the Maronite monk Elias ibn Ibrahim.
1543	Sicilian	Claudio Mario d'Arezzo	
1552	Geʽez	Mariano Vittorio	written in collaboration with the Ethiopian monk Täsfa Ṣǝyon.
1558	Purépecha	Maturino Gilberti	Gilberti's Arte de la lengua de Michoacán is first printed grammar of an American indigenous language.
1560	Quechua	Domingo de Santo Tomás	
1567	Welsh	Gruffydd Robert	
1568	Polish	Pierre Statorius	
1571	Nahuatl	Alonso de Molina	
1578	Zapotec	Juan de Córdova	
1584	Dutch	Hendrik Laurenszoon Spiegel	
1584	Slovene	Adam Bohorič	
1586	Church Slavonic	anonymous	
1586	English	William Bullokar	
1593	Mixtec	Antonio de los Reyes	
1595	Tupi	José de Anchieta	known by the title Arte de gramática da língua mais usada na costa do Brasil
1603	Aymara	Ludovico Bertonio	
1604	Japanese	João Rodrigues Tçuzu	known by the title Arte da Lingoa de Iapam
1604	Croatian	Bartol Kašić	
1606	Mapuche	Luis de Valdivia	Valdivia also published in 1607 two other grammars for Allentiac and Millcayac languages.
1610	Tagalog	Francisco Blancas de San José	
1612	Malay	Albert Cornelius Ruyl	
1612	Turkish	Hieronymus Megiser	based on manuscript written by Hector von Ernau.
1614	Timucua	Francisco Pareja	
1618	Hiligaynon	Alonso de Méntrida	
1619	Chibcha	Bernardo de Lugo	
1620	Yucatec Maya	Juan Coronel	
1622	Modern Greek	Girolamo Germano	
1624	Armenian	Francesco Rivola	
1627	Ilocano	Francisco Lopez	
1636	Coptic	Athanasius Kircher	Kircher's Prodromus Coptus was based on manuscript written by Yuhanna al-Samannudi.
1637	Estonian	Heinrich Stahl	
1637	Mazahua	Diego de Nágera Yanguas	
1638	Basque	Arnauld de Oihenart	
1639	Persian	Louis de Dieu	
1640	Guarani	Antonio Ruiz de Montoya	
1640	Konkani	Thomas Stephens	Stephens' Arte da Lingoa Canarim is the first printed grammar of any Indian language.
1643	Georgian	Francesco Maria Maggio	
1643	Old English	Abraham Wheelocke	A summary of the Old English grammar was included in Wheelocke's edition of Bede's Historia ecclesiastica gentis Anglorum
1644	Mam	Diego de Reynoso	
1644	Mochica	Fernando de la Carrera	
1644	Latvian	Johans Georgs Rēhehūzens	
1647	Bikol	Andrés de San Agustin	
1649	Finnish	Eskil Petraeus	
1651	Vietnamese	Alexandre de Rhodes	
1651	Icelandic	Runolf Jonsson	
1653	Lithuanian	Daniel Klein	
1659	Kongo	Giacinto Brusciotto	
1659	Breton	Julien Maunoir	
1663	Waray	Domingo Ezguerra	
1666	Massachusett	John Eliot	
1667	Kalinago	Raymond Breton	
1668	Danish	Erik Pontoppidan	
1672	Tamil	Philippus Baldaeus	
1677	Irish	Froinsias Ó Maolmhuaidh	
1679	Sorbian	Xaver Jakub Ticin	
1680	Cumanagoto	Francisco de Tauste	
1681	Frisian	Simon Abbes Gabbema	A grammar of Frisian was included in the Gabbema's edition of Gysbert Japiks's Friesche Rymlerye
1683	Tarahumara	Tomas de Guadalajara	
1686	Manchu	Ferdinand Verbiest	reprinted by Melchisédech Thévenot in 1696, with Martino Martini's Chinese Grammar
1689	Gothic	George Hickes	
1690	Pangasinan	Andrés Lopez	
1696	Swedish	Nils Tiällmann	
1696	Russian	Heinrich Wilhelm Ludolf	
1696	Chinese	Martino Martini	published by Melchisédech Thévenot in his Relations de divers voyages curieux
1697	Kimbundu	Pedro Dias	
1698	Amharic	Hiob Ludolf	written in collaboration with Abba Gorgoryos.
1699	Kipeá	Luigi Vincenzo Mamiani	Mamiani published the only grammar of a non-Tupi language from colonial Brazil; known by the title Arte de grammatica da lingua brasilica da naçam kiriri.
1699	Morocosi	anonymous	
1702	Opata	Natal Lombardo	
1707	Cornish	Edward Lhuyd	A grammar of cornish language was included in Lhuyd's Archæologia Britannica.
1707	Sinhala	Johannes Ruell	
1716	Albanian	Francesco Maria da Lecce	
1729	Romansh	Flaminio da Sale	
1729	Kapampangan	Diego Bergaño	
1729	Mixe	Agustín de Quintana	
1731	Otomi	Francisco Haedo	
1732	Lule	Antonio Machoni	
1737	Cahita	Tomás Basilio	
1738	Sámi	Pehr Fjellström	
1743	Hindi	David Mills	based on manuscript written by Joan Josua Kettler.
1743	Bengali	Manuel da Assumpção	
1743	Tepehuan	Benito Rinaldini	
1747	Huastec	Carlos de Tapia Zenteno	
1750	Maltese	Agius de Soldanis	
1752	Totonac	José Zambrano Bonilla	
1753	Kaqchikel	Ildefonso Joseph Flores	
1760	Greenlandic	Paul Egede	
1769	Chuvash	anonymous	
1770	Negerhollands	Joachim Melchior Magens	
1775	Mari	anonymous	
1775	Udmurt	anonymous	
1778	Scottish Gaelic	William Shaw	
1778	Marathi	anonymous	
1779	Neapolitan	Ferdinando Galiani	
1780	Romanian	Samuil Micu-Klein	
1782	Sardinian	Matteo Madao	
1783	Piedmontese	Maurizio Pipino	
1787	Kurdish	Maurizio Garzoni	
1790	Sanskrit	Paulinus of St. Bartholomew	based on manuscript written by Johann Ernst Hanxleden.
1790	Slovak	Anton Bernolák	
1794	Slavo-Serbian	Avram Mrazović	
1799	Malayalam	Robert Drummond	

== See also ==
- Dictionaries
- Glossaries
- Language documentation
- List of Croatian grammar books
