= Council for Standard Croatian Language Norm =

Council for Standard Croatian Language Norm (Croatian: Vijeće za normu hrvatskoga standardnoga jezika) was a linguistic council established for the purpose of providing orthographical and orthoepical norm for the Croatian standard language that existed between 2005 and 2012.

It has been appointed by Dragan Primorac, the Minister of Science Education and Sports at the April 14, 2005, with academic Radoslav Katičić as its head. According to the appointing document, the purpose of the Council was:

- to provide systematic professional care of Croatian standard language
- to discuss current issues and open questions of Croatian standard language
- to point out examples of ignoring constitutional decree of Croatian as an official language
- to promote the culture of Croatian standard language in written and spoken communication
- to take care on place and role of Croatian standard language with respect to the process of integration of the Republic of Croatia into the European Union
- to bring solutions regarding the further norming of the Croatian standard language
- to monitor general language issues and set out principles in orthographical norm

Members of the Council were: Ivo Pranjković, Dunja Pavličević-Franić, Mirko Peti, Ljiljaka Kolenić, Dunja Brozović-Rončević, Marija Turk, Branka Tafra, Tomislav Ladan, Mile Mamić, Ivan Zoričić, Joško Božanić and Marko Samardžija.

It was abolished on May 8, 2012, by the incumbent Minister of Science, Education and Sports, Željko Jovanović, its function being superseded by the Institute of Croatian Language and Linguistics.

== See also ==
- Institute of Croatian Language and Linguistics
