= Lovro Šitović =

Croatian grammarian and writer (c. 1682 – 1729)

The Reverend Lovro Šitović OFM
- Born: Hasan Šitović c. 1682; Ljubuški, Herzegovina, Ottoman Empire
- Died: 28 February 1729 (aged 46–47); Sebenico, Dalmatia, Republic of Venice
- Years active: Early modern period
- Known for: Authored Latin grammar for Croat students

Academic background
- Influences: Manuel Álvares, Jakov Mikalja

Academic work
- Discipline: Grammar
- Main interests: Latin; grammar; poetry; theology
- Notable works: Grammatica Latino-Illyrica (1713)
- Influenced: Toma Babić, Marijan Lanosović, Matija Antun Reljković, Blaž Tadijanović

Signature
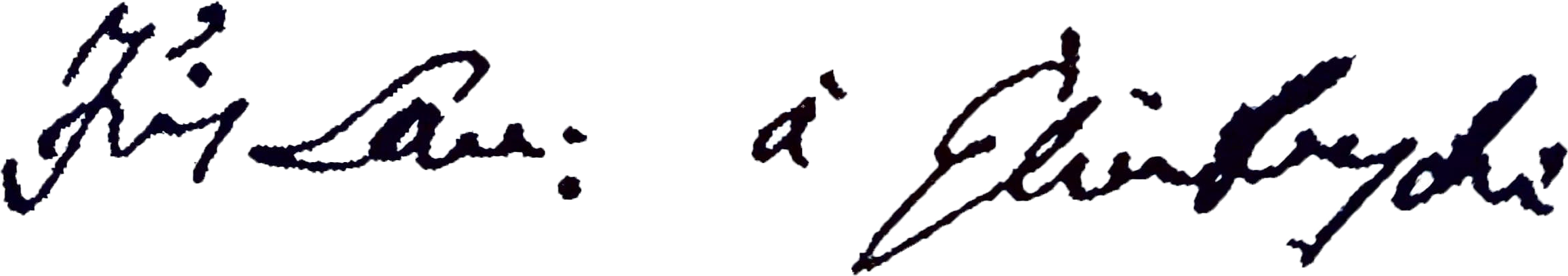

Lovro Šitović OFM (c. 1682 – 28 February 1729) was a Croatian Franciscan friar, grammarian, preacher, and Baroque writer whose works significantly influenced Croatian literature and education in the early 18th century. Born Hasan Šitović in Ljubuški, Ottoman Bosnia and Herzegovina, to a Muslim family, he was kidnapped as a child during the Morean War by Catholic hajduks from Venetian Dalmatia. This exposed him to Catholicism, and in 1699, he converted, taking the name Stipan upon his baptism. He joined the Franciscans in 1701, adopting the religious name Lovro, and began a career that blended scholarly pursuits with pastoral service.

He was sent for education in Italy and was ordained a priest there in 1707. Upon returning home in 1708, Šitović taught philosophy and theology at friaries in Makarska, Šibenik, and Split. During the Ottoman–Venetian and Austro-Turkish wars, he risked his life ministering to soldiers and burying the dead. He has been evaluated, alongside Jesuit Ardelio Della Bella, as one of southern Croatia's greatest preachers. Šitović died in Šibenik in 1729 while preaching a Lenten sermon, cementing his legacy in Croatian history.

Šitović’s most notable contribution is his 1713 publication, Grammatica Latino-Illyrica, a Latin grammar text written in the Younger Ikavian dialect. Designed for Croat schoolchildren, it influenced several subsequent Croat grammarians and was widely used by Franciscan educators for over a century. Beyond grammar, Šitović authored popular religious works, including Pisna od pakla (1727), a poetic critique of secular folk songs and other devotional texts that resonated with Catholic readers, particularly in Ottoman Bosnia and Herzegovina. His writings, rooted in the Baroque style, reflected his mission to promote Christian values and education in a region marked by cultural and religious diversity.

== Early life ==
Šitović was born in Ljubuški in the Ottoman Bosnia and Herzegovina. He was born into a Muslim family and was named Hasan. At the time, the Morean War between the neighbouring Republic of Venice and the Ottoman Empire, was in its early stages. During the war, Christian hajduks from the Venetian Dalmatia intruded into and plundered the adjacent Herzegovinian and Bosnian areas. During one of these intrusions, in either 1690 or 1694, the hajduk harambaša Šimun Talajić Delija kidnapped Šitović's father. His father left Šitović to the hajduks as a pledge while he collected the demanded ransom. While a hostage, Šitović learned how to read and write, and developed sympathies for Christianity. He was taken home when his father paid the ransom, but shortly after, Šitović left his home to return to his former captor, Delija. Delija took Šitović to the Franciscan friary in Zaostrog, where Šitović was allowed to remain and learn about Christianity. On 2 February 1699, at the age of 17, Šitović was christened by Fiar Ilija Mamić as Stipan.

== Franciscan Order ==
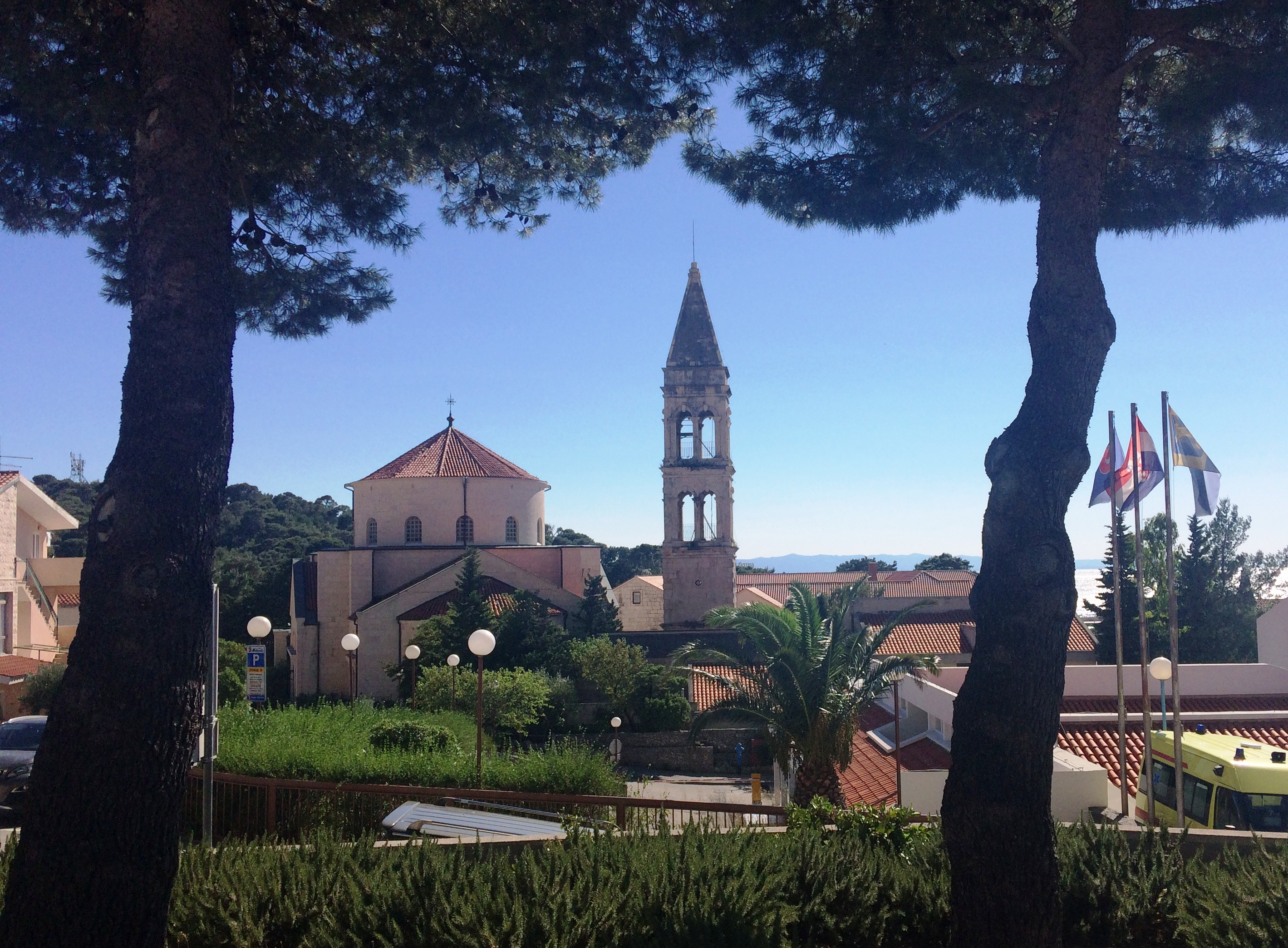
Friary church in Makarska where Šitović taught philosophy from 1708 to 1715 and from 1724 to his death

Šitović became interested in living a consecrated life. He was sent to a novitiate in Našice, in Slavonia, where on 10 April 1701, he put on the Franciscan habit and chose Lovro as his religious name. Šitović was then sent for education in Italy, where he stayed until 1708. While in Italy, he was ordained to the priesthood in 1707. After completing his education, in 1708, Šitović became a philosophy professor and educator for the seminarians at the Makarska friary. When the philosophy studies in Makarska were discontinued in 1715, Šitović was transferred to the Šibenik friary to teach theology. In 1718, Archbishop Stefano Cupilli of Split invited him to teach theology at the archdiocesan seminary in Split, Croatia. In 1720, Šitović was awarded the title of general lector and honorary definitor (assistant) of the Franciscan Province of Bosnia. After philosophy studies were reintroduced in Makarska in 1724, Šitović returned to teach there. During these years, Šitović risked his life during the Ottoman–Venetian War (1714–1718) and the Austro-Turkish War (1716–1718) by hearing soldiers' confessions, giving last rites to the dying, and burying the dead—especially during the defence of Sinj and liberation of Imotski. To reward him, Sebastiano Mocenigo, the provveditore general of Dalmatia, gave land near Sinj to Šitović's brother's wife and nephew, who had converted to Christianity.

From 1723, Šitović served as an examiner of candidates for a professorship in philosophy, and from 1726, as an examiner of theology seminarians before their ordination to the priesthood. In 1727, he was appointed the administrator of a Franciscan inn in Dorbo near Split. Šitović died in Šibenik while preaching there during Lent. Franciscan historians Stipan Zlatović (1831 – 1891) and Josip Grbavac (born 1952) considered Šitović to be one of the greatest preachers in southern Croatia, alongside Ardelio Della Bella. Another Franciscan historian, Ante Crnica (1892 – 1969), considered him one of the greatest Croat preachers.

== Works ==
Šitović was a Baroque author, and wrote in the Shtokavian Ikavian dialect, becoming one of the most popular authors of the older period of Croatian literature. His works were widely read in Ottoman Bosnia and Herzegovina.

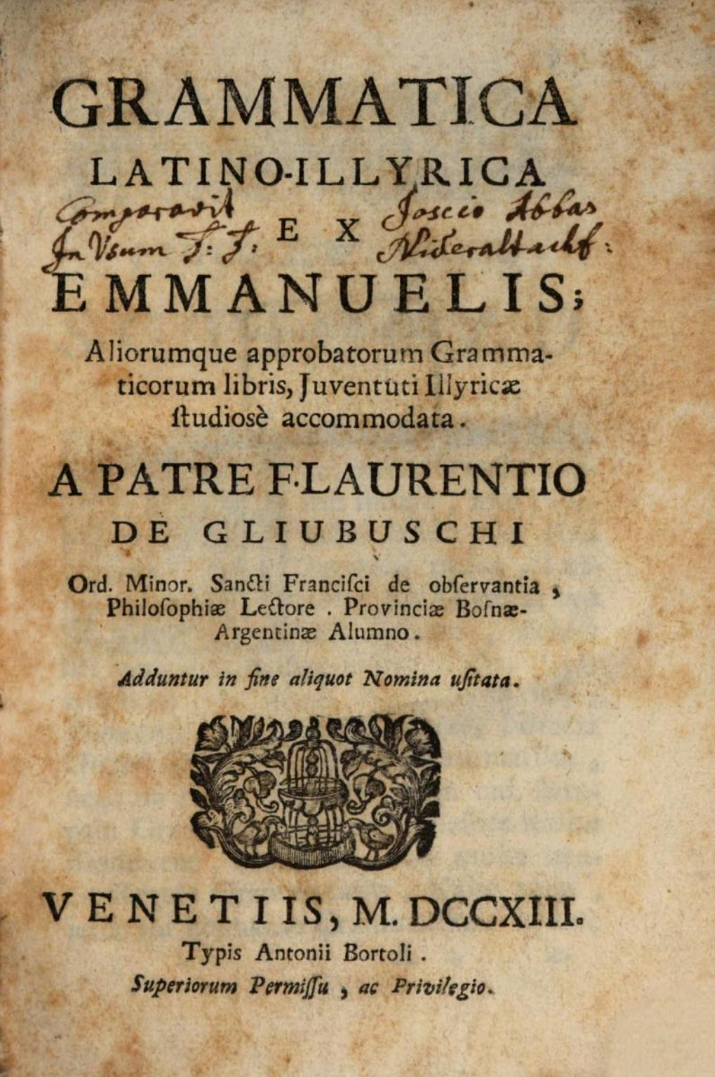
Cover page of the first edition of Grammatica Latino-Illyrica, 1713

In Venice in 1713, Šitović published a Latin grammar text called Grammatica Latino-Illyrica, which was written for Illyrian schoolchildren using the Shtokavian dialect, which he referred to as Illyrian. Šitović's grammar follows the tradition of Manuel Álvares. The influence of Jakov Mikalja is noticeable in Šitović's use of terms and his model for creating new ones. Toma Babić had published his work Prima grammaticae institutio pro tyronibus Illiricis accomodata the previous year, and its incompleteness was noted in educational practice. Šitović, being unsatisfied with it, published his grammar text the following year. His text is more extensive and became widely accepted. Compared to Babić's, Šitović's grammar text is richer in syntactic rules. When publishing the second edition of his grammar in 1745, Babić used a lot of material from Šitović's work. Šitović and Babić used Croatian as a metalanguage for the grammatical narrative when adapting Latin grammar into other languages; this is recognised as a significant innovation.

Explaining his motivation for writing the grammar, Šitović wrote:

My dear and lovely reader, do not be surprised at this effort of mine, even if it is a small one, because when you understand the reason: ... It is already evident to you that many nations, that is, the French, the Spanish, the Italians, the Germans, the Hungarians, etc., learn grammar more easily than we Croats ... because they print grammars translated into their language ... because we do not have grammars translated into our language. Even though some grammar teachers [referring to Babić] have translated the declensions of names and conjugations of Croatian verbs ...

Grammatica Latino-Illyrica had two more editions published in 1742 and 1781. Šitović's grammar text was still in use more than a century after its publication by many generations of Franciscans, young adults, adolescents and children who were educated at Franciscan friaries and parishes outside his own Franciscan Bosnian Province. His work influenced Croat grammarians from Slavonia, including Marijan Lanosović, Matija Antun Reljković, and Blaž Tadijanović.

Šitović's other work Pisna od pakla ('A song of hell'), a song in five cantos, was published in 1727 in Venice. It was also written in Shtokavian dialect, in "Croatian language and singing", and was dedicated to "people who speak Croatian". Šitović used ten-syllable verse, a model that would dominate folk and artistic literature in the following decades. In this poem, Šitović decries folk songs, their un-Christian heroes, and their praise of love and wine. He urges the clergy to eradicate such songs and to promote those calling for devotion and penitence. Slobodan Prosperov Novak characterised Pisna od pakla as a "vulgarised Divine Comedy" that was easily accessible to people "in Bosnian backwoods". Ivo Andrić wrote of it as Šitović's "most interesting work", however "frequently irregular and quite devoid of any beauty". Another edition of Pisna od pakla titled Pisma od pakla was published in the mid-18th century; this second edition has confused historians because it gives 1727 as its publication date and it was long assumed the work only had one edition.

Šitović's other works include Doctrina christiana et piae aliquot cantilenae ('Christian doctrine and some pious hymns'), which was published in 1713 in Venice; Promišljanja i molitve ('Reflections and prayers'), which was published in 1734 in Buda; and List nauka krstjanskog ('A paper of the Christian teaching'), which was published in 1752 in Venice.
