= History of swimming =

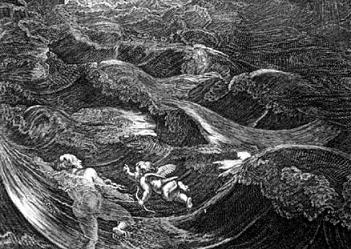
Leander swimming across the Hellespont. Detail from a painting by Bernard Picart.

Swimming has been recorded since prehistoric times; the earliest recording of swimming dates back to Stone Age paintings from around 7,000 years ago. In 1578 (or 1538, see Swimming (sport)) , Nikolaus Wynmann, a German professor of languages, wrote the first swimming book. Swimming was part of the first modern Olympic games which was held in 1896 in Athens. In 1908, the world swimming association, Fédération Internationale de Natation (FINA), was formed. In January 2023, the name was changed from FINA to World Aquatics.

Swimming has been used in political contexts as well as in times of war as a way to defend a country from ancient times to the present. Swimming in the Victorian and Edwardian eras has also been connected to children's activities such as Boy Scouts, in which many scouts had to prove themselves competent in the water, leading to the growth of swimming competitions for young people. In the modern era, swimming has played an important role in the lives of children by helping to break gender norms and by leading to calls for safety regulations around water. The addition of swimming to activities like summer camp has, advocates argue, increased youth self esteem and allowed many kids to express themselves and have fun. Swimming has also been impacted by equal rights movements, with the inclusion of women in the sport, and the inclusion of activities once considered men's events in women's swimming.

== Ancient times ==
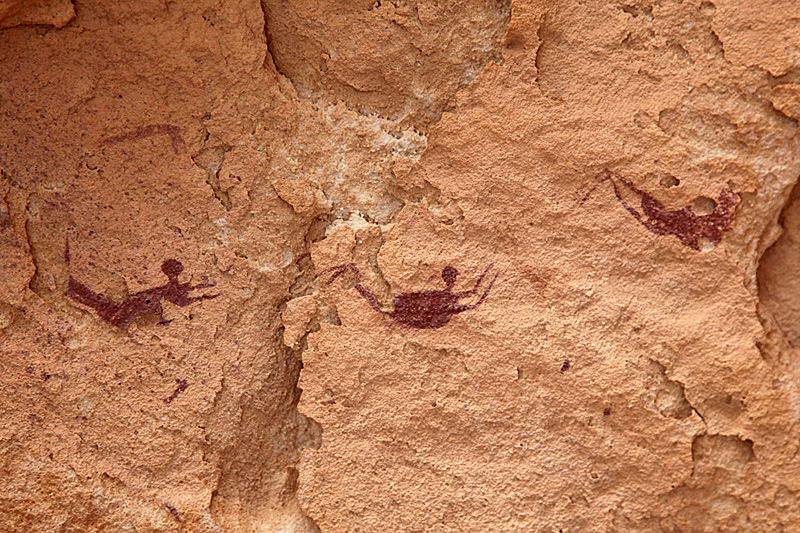
Rock paintings from the Cave of Swimmers

Rock paintings of people with their arms and legs contorted in a swimming position were found by explorer László Almásy in a remote cave in Wadi Sura, in the south of the Gilf Kebir Plateau, Egypt. Almásy believed the figures to illustrate swimming, and therefore named the cave "The Cave of Swimmers". Despite this, modern researchers such as Andras Zboray argue that the paintings are "clearly symbolic, ...with an unknown meaning.". Rock paintings are hard to date, but most researchers believe they were created between 6000–9000 years ago.

More references to swimming are found in the Babylonian and Assyrian wall drawings, depicting a variant of the breaststroke. The most famous drawings were found in the Kebir desert and are estimated to be from around 4000 BC. The Nagoda bas-relief also shows swimmers inside of men dating back from 3000 BC. The Indian palace Mohenjo Daro from 2800 BC contains a swimming pool sized 12 m by 7 m. The Minoan palace of Knossos in Crete also featured baths. An Egyptian tomb from 2000 BC shows a variant of front crawl. The Egyptian nomarch Kheti carved into the walls how he took swimming lessons with the king's children. Swimming was also seen as an important skill in war efforts, as Julius Caesar was deemed a very good swimmer, and encouraged swimming lessons to be taken by his military, which include crossing rivers while on horse and simulating naval battles. Depictions of swimmers have also been found from the Hittites, Minoans and other Middle Eastern civilizations, in the Tepantitla compound at Teotihuacan, and in mosaics in Pompeii.

Written references date back to ancient times, with the earliest as early as 2000 BC. Such references occur in works like Gilgamesh, the Iliad, the Odyssey, the Bible (Ezekiel 47:5, Acts 27:42, Isaiah 25:11), Beowulf, and other sagas, although the style is never described. There are also many mentions of swimmers in the Vatican, Borgian and Bourbon codices. A series of reliefs from 850 BC in the Nimrud Gallery of the British Museum shows swimmers, mostly in a military context, often using swimming aids.

The Talmud, a compendium of Jewish law written compiled c. 500 CE, requires fathers to teach their sons how to swim.

== Early modern era ==
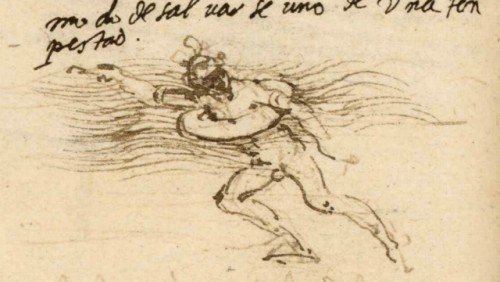
Lifebelt sketch by Leonardo da Vinci (circa 1488–90).

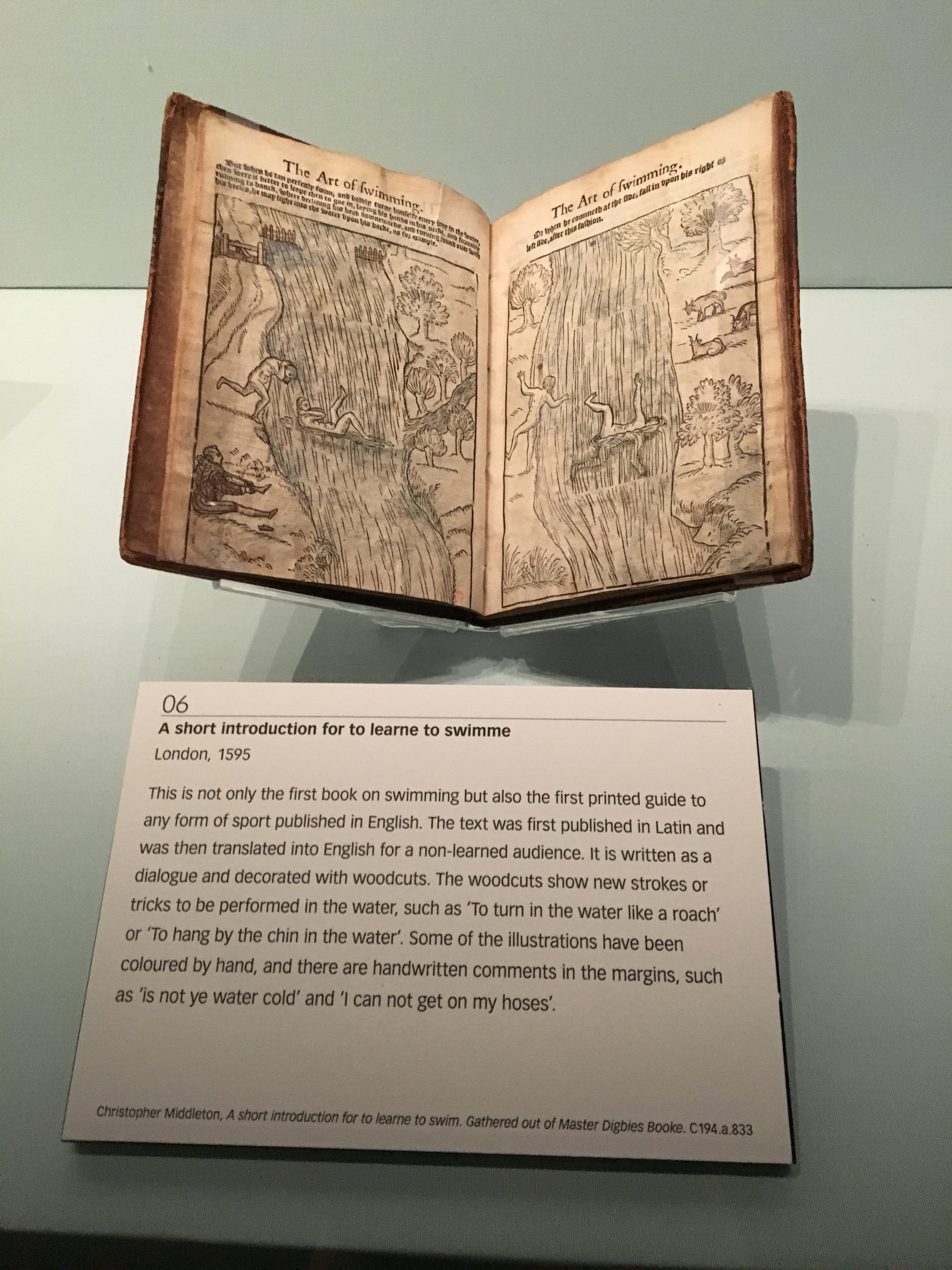
The book "A short introduction for to learn to swim" - British Library

Since swimming was done in a state of undress, it became less popular as society became more conservative in the Early Modern period.

In 1538, Nikolaus Wynmann, a Swiss–German professor of languages, wrote the earliest known complete book about swimming, Colymbetes, sive de arte natandi dialogus et festivus et iucundus lectu (The Swimmer, or A Dialogue on the Art of Swimming and Joyful and Pleasant to Read). His purpose was to reduce the dangers of drowning. The book contained a good methodical approach to learning breaststroke, and mentioned swimming aids such as air-filled cow bladders, reed bundles, and cork belts.

In 1587, Everard Digby also wrote a swimming book, claiming that humans could swim better than fish. Digby was a Senior Fellow at St. John's College, Cambridge, and was interested in the scientific method. His short treatise, De arte natandi, was written in Latin and contained over 40 woodcut illustrations depicting various methods of swimming, including the breaststroke, backstroke and crawl. Digby regarded the breaststroke as the most useful form of swimming. In 1603, Emperor Go-Yozei of Japan declared that schoolchildren should swim.

In 1595, Christopher Middleton wrote "A short introduction for to learn to swim", that was the first published guide recording drawings and examples of different swimming styles.

During colonial periods, many westerners could only swim well enough to survive, using what we call now breastroke, while Atlantic Africans used variations of freestyle for fishing and spear hunting. Many travelers noted that the African locals were very talented swimmers. One story comes from a US Navy Officer who detailed that five Europeans and five Kru people from Liberia were on the same boat that started to sink. All five Europeans on the boat drowned, while the Kru people were able to swim until they were saved.

From 1600 to 1867, during the Edo period in Japan, swimming increased in popularity and saw the development of swim schools. Many shōguns encouraged and promoted swimming. The first Tokugawa shōgun, Tokugawa lesyasu, was believed to have swum until he was 69 years old. Swimming was especially encouraged during the third and eighth shōgun. Nearing the end of the Edo period, increasing threats by foreign powers led to building up the coastlines of Japan and swimming served as a way to defend against enemies.

In 1696, the French author Melchisédech Thévenot wrote The Art of Swimming, describing a breaststroke very similar to the modern breaststroke. This book was translated into English and became the standard reference of swimming for many years to come.

In 1798, GutsMuths wrote another book Kleines Lehrbuch der Schwimmkunst zum Selbstunterricht (Small study book of the art of swimming for self-study), recommending the use of a "fishing rod" device to aid in the learning of swimming. His books describe a three-step approach to learning to swim that is still used today. First, get the student used to the water; second, practice the swimming movements out of the water; and third, practice the swimming movements in the water. He believed that swimming is an essential part of every education.

== Modern era ==
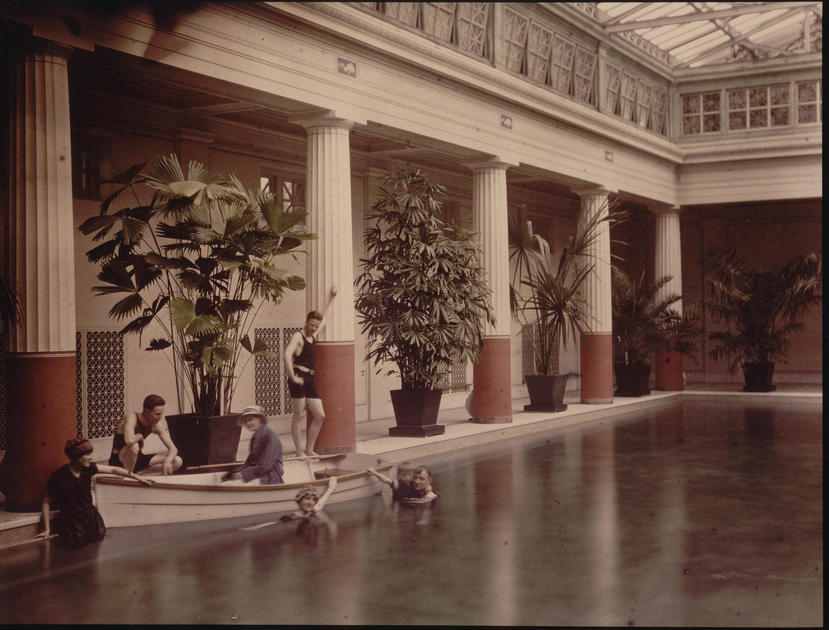
Swimming pool at Lyndhurst estate in Tarrytown, New York, United States, constructed in 1911 (photo c. 1920). Known as "Helen's Bath," it was built by the estate owner, prominent philanthropist Helen Miller Shepard (in the boat), who opened it to the public. The pool had full-time lifeguards (shown in the photo); swimming instructions were provided to local boys and girls. Helen's decision to build a publicly accessible pool was prompted by the 1904 General Slocum tragedy.

Boy Scouts become a very important part of the lives of Victorian and Edwardian children in Great Britain. Swimming was implemented as a requirement to earn certain titles and badges. As of 1911, in order for a Boy Scout to earn the title of First Class Scout, they had to swim 50 yards. There were three scout badges that required swimming ability during this period: the Coast Guard Badge, which required a knowledge of swimming and the ability to resuscitate a drowning victim; the Seaman Badge, which required swimming 50 yards while fully clothed; and the Swimmer and Life Saver Badge, which required diving, swimming 50 yards fully clothed, throwing a lifeline onto a buoy, and performing two methods of rescue for drowning victims. Boy Scouts kept a focus on swimming as both a life-saving skill, and something that everyone should learn how to do. These requirements changed in 1912, where in order to accommodate those with health problems, the swimming portion was removed from the First Class Scout title. Despite requirements being removed, Boy Scouts were still eligible for and encouraged to compete in swimming competitions, like the Otter Swimming Club Challenge Shield, the Boy Scout Team Swimming Championship of London, and the Darnell Challenge Cup for Swimming and Life Saving.

Swimming as a rescue procedure in the United States had its start in the early 1900s, after the 1904 General Slocum disaster, when a fire started onboard an excursion boat and more than 1,000 people (most of them women and children, unable to swim) drowned. This tragedy caught the attention of Wilbert E. Longfellow, who in 1914, contacted the American Red Cross and helped create their first water safety trainings. As World War 1 started, and the United States entered the war, the Red Cross entered army camps to educate those who could not swim, and those who could, in how to save lives. By 1922, national aquatic schools were added to the program to train in first aid instructors and water safety officials. In order to educate children, the Red Cross created a series of cartoons called Longfellow's WHALE tales, which stood for Water Habits Are Learned Early.

On July 16, 1966, the leader of China, 73-year-old Mao Zedong, swam in the Yangtze River as a way to encourage support for his authority, and encouraged others to practice Maoism. This event was the 11th Cross-Yangtze Swimming Contest, where 5,000 children were enrolled. Many Chinese people and foreign guests were in attendance, and none were told prior that Mao would be swimming. He swam 15 kilometers in 65 minutes, which helped dispel any doubts about his physical age and ability to lead. However, The Times noted that Mao did not swim, but was carried downstream by the current. This swim reaffirmed people's belief in his leadership, which prepared him for war against counter-revolutionaries. As a result, Mao's Communist government officials issued efforts to encourage youth and children to learn how to swim.

As of the modern era, swimming has also been credited to have many health benefits. In cases of fibromyalgia, swimming can help decrease anxiety. Doctor Brian J. Krabak mentions that swimming can improve the heart and allow it to get stronger, and make the lungs more efficient in using oxygen.

== Swimming as a competitive sport ==
The Birdman cult of Rapa Nui held an annual ritual competition to determine the Tangata manu, in which men swam one kilometer to and from an islet to collect the first sooty tern egg of the season. The ceremony was suppressed by Christian missionaries in the 1860s.

Swimming emerged as a competitive sport in the early 1800s in England. In 1828, the first indoor swimming pool, St George's Baths, was opened to the public. By 1837, the National Swimming Society was holding regular swimming competitions in six artificial swimming pools, built around London. The sport grew in popularity and by 1880, when the first national governing body, the Amateur Swimming Association, was formed, there were already over 300 regional clubs in operation across the country.

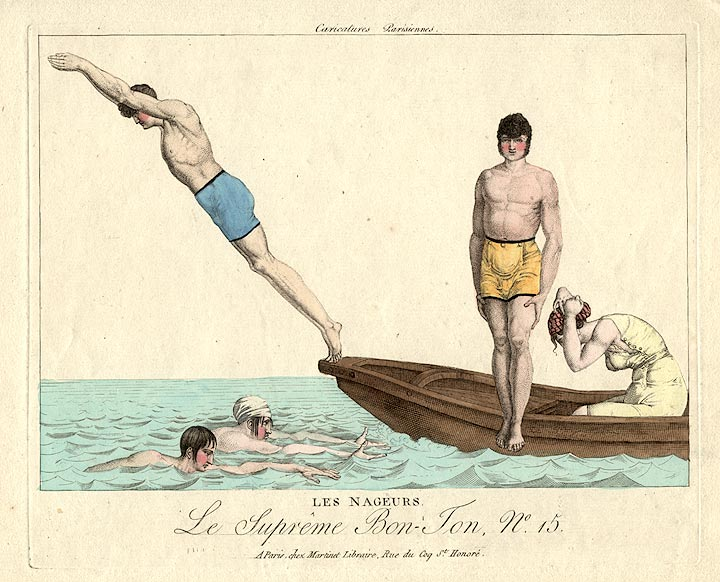
Les Nageurs (The Swimmers), from the series Le Supreme Bon Ton, c. 1810–1815.

In 1844 a swimming competition was held in London with the participation of two Native Americans. The British competitor used the traditional breaststroke, while the Native Americans swam a variant of the front crawl, which had been used by people in the Americas for generations, but was not known to the British. The winning medal went to 'Flying Gull' who swam the 130-foot length in 30 seconds – the Native American swimming method proved to be a much faster style than the British breaststroke. The Times of London reported disapprovingly that the Native American stroke was an unrefined motion with the arms "like a windmill" and the chaotic and unregulated kicking of the legs. The considerable splashing that the stroke caused was deemed to be barbaric and "un-European" to the British gentlemen, who preferred to keep their heads over the water. Subsequently, the British continued to swim only breaststroke until 1873. The British did, however, adapt the breaststroke into the speedier sidestroke, where the swimmer lies to one side; this became the more popular choice by the late 1840s. In 1895, J. H. Thayers of England swam 100 yards (91 m) in a record-breaking 1:02.50 using a sidestroke.

Sir John Arthur Trudgen picked up the hand-over stroke from South American natives he observed swimming on a trip to Buenos Aires. On his return to England in 1868, he successfully debuted the new stroke in 1873 and won a local competition in 1875. Although the new stroke was really the reintroduction of a more intuitive method for swimming, one that had been in evidence in ancient cultures such as Ancient Assyria, his method revolutionized the state of competitive swimming – his stroke is still regarded as the most powerful to use today. In his stroke, the arms were brought forward, alternating, while the body rolled from side to side. The kick was a scissors kick such as that familiarly used in breaststroke, with one kick for two arm strokes, although it is believed that the Native Americans had indeed used a flutter kick. Front crawl variants used different ratios of scissor kicks to arm strokes, or alternated with a flutter (up-and-down) kick. The speed of the new stroke was demonstrated by F.V.C. Lane in 1901, swimming 100 yards (91 m) in 1:00.0, an improvement of about ten seconds compared to the breaststroke record. Due to its speed the Trudgen became very quickly popular around the world, despite all the ungentleman-like splashing.

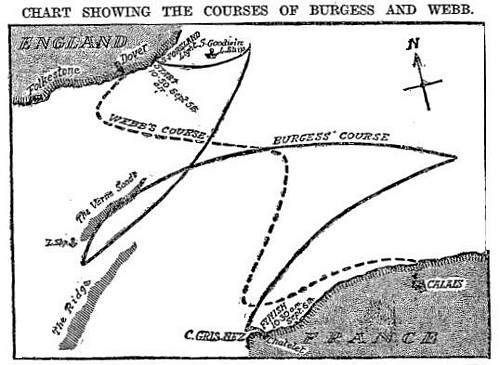
The routes taken by Webb and Bill Burgess across the English Channel, in 1875 and 1911, respectively.

Captain Matthew Webb was the first man to swim the English Channel (between England and France), in 1875. He used breaststroke, swimming 21.26 miles (34.21 km) in 21 hours and 45 minutes. His feat was not replicated or surpassed for the next 36 years, until Bill Burgess made the crossing in 1911. Other European countries also established swimming federations; Germany in 1882, France in 1890 and Hungary in 1896. The first European amateur swimming competitions were in 1889 in Vienna. The world's first women's swimming championship was held in Scotland in 1892.

Nancy Edberg popularized women's swimming in Stockholm from 1847. She made swimming lessons accessible for both sexes and later introduced swimming lessons for women in Denmark and Norway. Her public swimming exhibitions from 1856 with her students were likely among the first public exhibitions of women swimming in Europe.

Title IX, signed into law in June 1972 by President Richard Nixon, ensured equal protections against discrimination in sports based upon sex in programs that received federal funding. Some of these protections included equality of opportunity in equipment, scheduling games and practices, locker rooms, and access to medical and training facilities provided for athletes. Despite this, the NCAA did not host its first Women's Swimming Championship until 1982.

== Olympic era ==
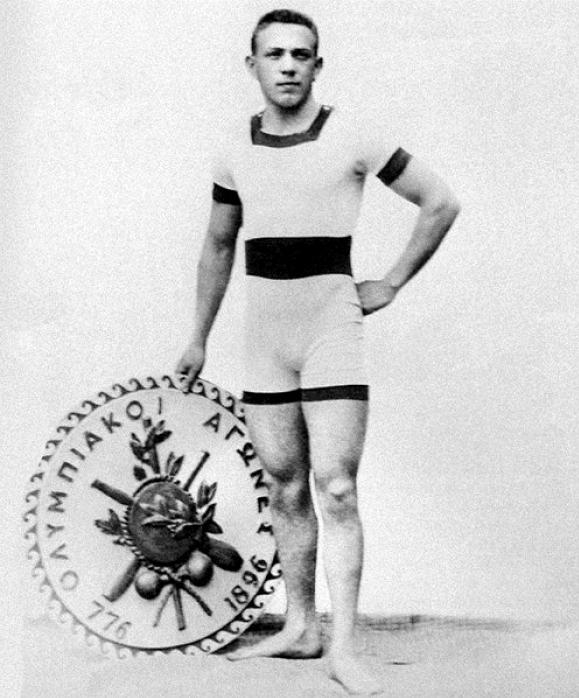
Alfréd Hajós, swimmer who won the first Olympic Gold medal.

Swimming was held at the first Olympic Games, held in 1896 in Athens however, due to a lack of funds, the event was moved to a nearby bay of Piraeus.

The Trudgen stroke was improved by Australian-born Richmond Cavill. Cavill, whose father Frederick Cavill narrowly failed to swim the English Channel, is credited with developing the stroke after observing a young boy from the Solomon Islands. Cavill and his brothers spread the Australian crawl to England, New Zealand and America. Richmond used this stroke in 1902 at an International Championships in England to set a new world record by out swimming all Trudgen swimmers over the 100 yards (91 m) in 0:58.4.

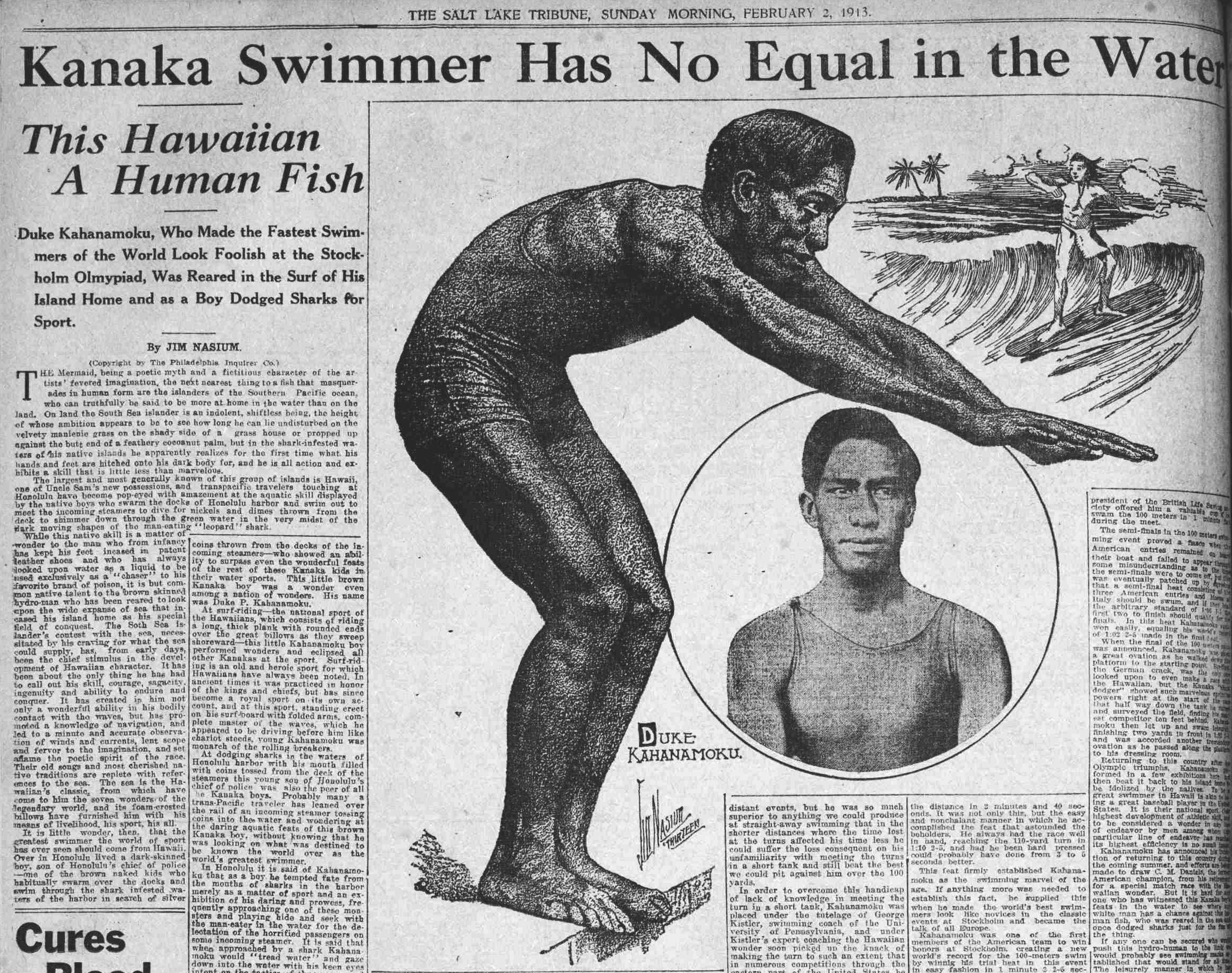
The Salt Lake Tribune featuring Duke Kahanamoku in 1913.

In both America and England, women in the 1910s and 1920 pushed back against restrictions on what women swimmers could wear. These swimming suffragettes changed public opinion on women's involvement in swimming, including the admission of women in the 1912 Summer Olympics in Stockholm, competing in freestyle races.

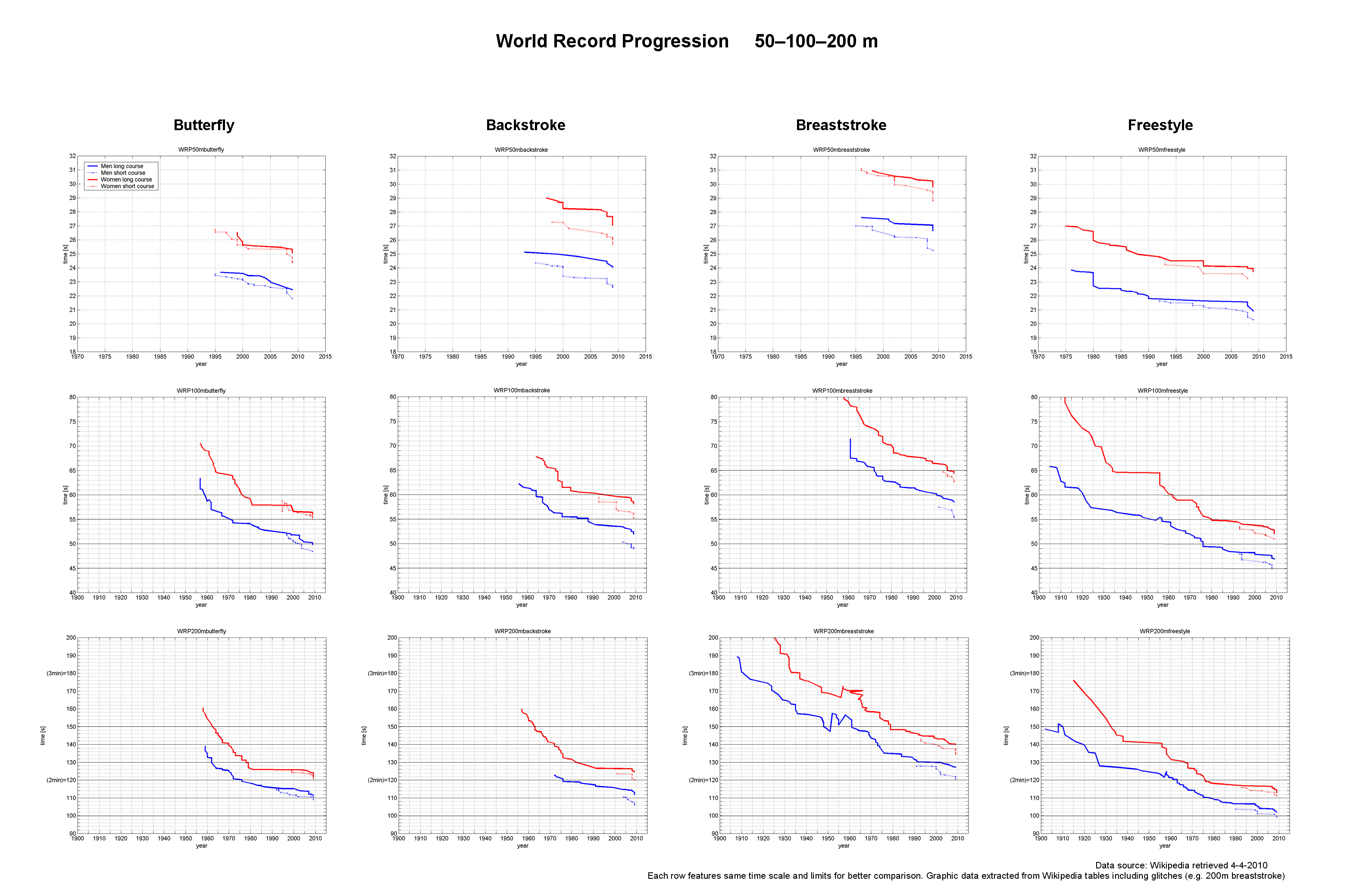
Graphic data for World Record Progression in Men and Women Swimming 50m-100m-200m Long and Short Course Butterfly-Backstroke-Breaststroke-Freestyle

Prior to the 2020 Tokyo Olympics, the 1,500m freestyle was not a Women's event, despite the event being in circulation since 2001 World Championships. Instead, women swam the 800m freestyle as their longest distance. In 2021, the women's 1,500m freestyle and the men's 800m freestyle was added to the lineup of events. Starting in 2021, the events swam in the Olympics included, for both men and women: 50, 100, 200, 400, 800, and 1,500 meters of freestyle, 100 and 200 meters of backstroke, breaststroke, and butterfly, 200 and 400 meters of Individual Medley, which is a combination of the four strokes, and relays that include the 4x100m freestyle, 4x100m Medley, 4x200m freestyle, and the mixed 4x100m Medley relay, which consists of teams of four, with two women and two men competing on the same team.

== See also ==
- History of Swimwear
- Aquatic ape hypothesis
- History of water supply and sanitation
- List of swimming competitions
- Swimming at the Summer Olympics
