= Jean de Thévenot =

French traveller in the East, linguist and botanist (1633–1667)

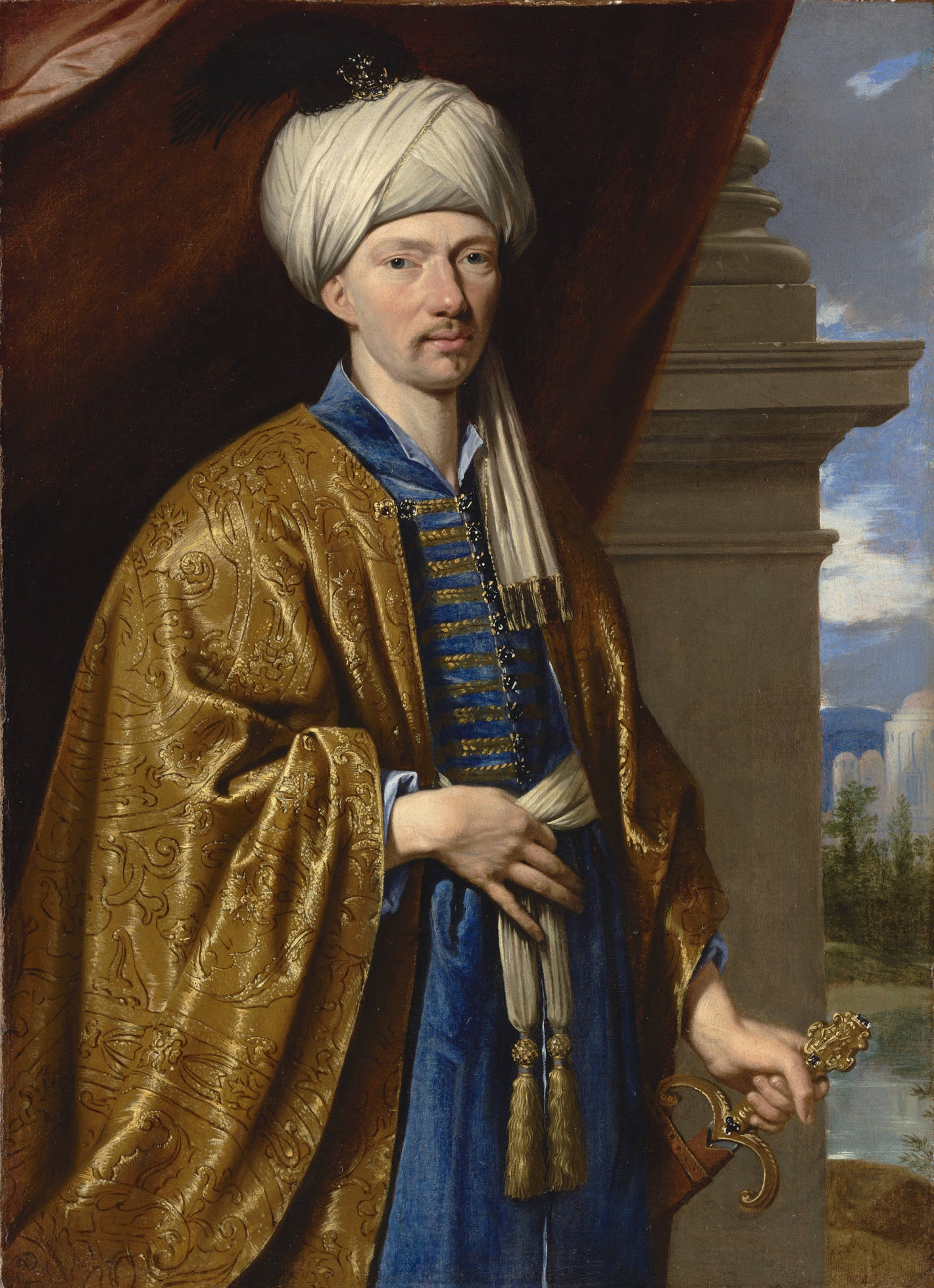
- Jean de Thévenot c. 1660's
- Born: 16 June 1633; Paris
- Died: 28 November 1667 (aged 34); Mianeh
- Occupation: Traveller

Jean de Thévenot (English: /ˈtɛvənoʊ/ TE-və-noh, French: [ʒɑ̃ də tevəno]; 16 June 1633 – 28 November 1667) was a French traveller in Asia, who wrote extensively about his journeys. He was also a linguist, natural scientist and botanist.

== Education ==
He was born in Paris and received his education in the Collège de Navarre. He was a nephew of Melchisédech Thévenot, with whom he is often confused.

== Early European travels (1652–1655) ==
Thévenot conceived a desire to travel from reading other travel writing, and his wealth allowed him to fulfill this desire. Leaving France in 1652, he first visited England, the Netherlands, Germany and Italy. At Rome he fell in with D'Herbelot, who invited him to be his companion in a projected voyage to the Levant. D'Herbelot was detained by private affairs, but Thévenot sailed from Rome in May 1655, and, after vainly waiting five months at Malta, took passage for Constantinople alone.

== Travels to the Ottoman Empire (1655–1663) ==
He remained in Istanbul until the following August, and then proceeded to Smyrna, the Greek islands, and finally to Egypt, landing at Alexandria on New Year's Day, 1657. He stayed for a year in Egypt, then visited Sinai, and, upon returning to Cairo, joined the Lent pilgrim caravan to Jerusalem. He visited the chief places of pilgrimage in Palestine, and, after being twice taken by corsairs, got back to Damietta by sea, and was again in Cairo in time to view the opening of the canal on the rise of the Nile (14 August 1658).

In January 1659 he sailed from Alexandria in an English ship, visiting Goletta and Tunis (in what is today Tunisia) on the way, and, after a sharp engagement with Spanish corsairs, one of which fell a prize to the English merchantman, reached Livorno, Grand Duchy of Tuscany on 12 April. He now spent four years at home in studies useful to a traveller.

== Further travels (1663–1667) ==
In November 1663 again sailed for the East, calling at Alexandria and landing at Sidon, whence he proceeded by land to Damascus, Aleppo, and then through Mesopotamia to Mosul, Baghdad and Mendeli.

Here he entered Persia (27 August 1664), proceeding by Kermanshah and Hamadan to Isfahan, where he spent five months (October 1664 - February 1665), and then joining company with the merchant Tavernier, proceeded by Shiraz and Lar to Bander-Abbasi, in the hope of finding a passage to India. This was difficult, because of the opposition of the Dutch, and though Tavernier was able to proceed, Thévenot found it prudent to return to Shiraz. Having visited the ruins of Persepolis, he made his way to Basra and sailed for India on 6 November 1665, in the ship "Hopewell," arriving at the port of Surat on 10 January 1666.

He was in Mughal Empire of India for thirteen months, and crossed the country by Golconda to Masulipatam, returning overland to Surat, from which he sailed to Bandar-Abbas and went up to Shiraz. He passed the summer of 1667 at Isfahan, disabled and nursing a wound by an earlier accidental pistol-shot; and in October started for Tabriz, but died on the way at Mianeh on 28 November 1667.

== Linguistic skills and natural sciences ==
Thévenot was an accomplished polyglot, skilled in Turkish, Arabic and Persian, and a curious and diligent observer. He was also well skilled in natural sciences, especially in botany, for which he made large collections in India.

== Travel writing ==
The account of his first journey was published at Paris in 1665, under the title Relation d’un voyage fait au Levant. It forms the first part of his collected Voyages. The licence is dated December 1663, and the preface shows that Thévenot himself arranged it for publication before leaving on his second voyage. Among other things, he was one of the European travellers to include a story about the origins of the medieval Arabic document, the Achtiname of Muhammad, which claims that the Islamic prophet, Muhammad, had personally confirmed a grant of protection and other privileges to the monks of Saint Catherine's Monastery in Egypt.

The second and third parts of Thévenot's Voyages were posthumously published from his journals in 1674 and 1684 (all quarto). A collected edition appeared at Paris in 1689, duodecimos the same year and at Amsterdam in 1727 (5 vols.). There is an early English translation by A. Lovell (folio, London, 1687).

== See also ==
- Orientalism in early modern France

== Primary sources ==
- Thévenot, Jean de. Relation d’un voyage fait au Levant. Paris: L. Billaine, 1665.
- Thévenot's Voyages on Gallica
