= Jakov Mikalja =

Italian linguist and lexicographer

- Born: March 31, 1601
- Died: December 1, 1654 (aged 53)
- Other names: Jacobus Micalia, Jakov Mikalja
- Occupations: linguist and lexicographer

Jakov Mikalja (Latin: Jacobus Micalia) (March 31, 1601 – December 1, 1654), was a Croatian linguist and lexicographer. He was born in the town of Peschici (Apulia), at that time under the Kingdom of Naples. He said about himself to be "an Italian of Slavic language".

== Life ==
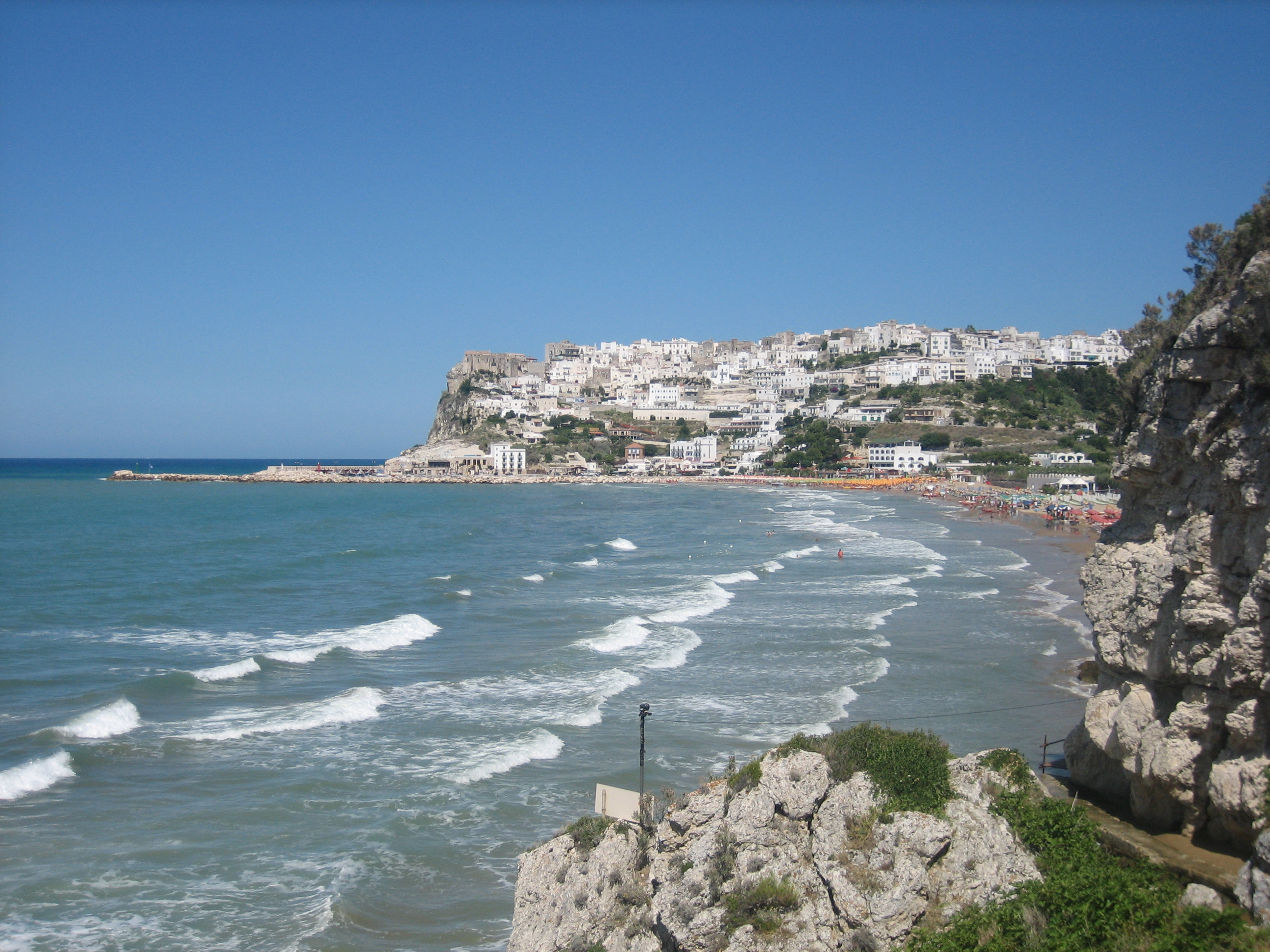
View of Peschici in the Italian Province of Foggia, the hometown of Giacomo Micaglia

Micaglia was born in Peschici, a small town on the Gargano peninsula that six centuries before (about 970) was a settlement of Croat refugees and that in those years entertained fruitful trade with Venice and the city-states on the Dalmatian coast (like the Republic of Ragusa).

He was the great-uncle of Pietro Giannone (1676–1748), the historian born in Ischitella, few kilometers by Peschici. About it Giannone writes that «Scipio Giannone (his father) had married in Ischitella in 1677 Lucretia Micaglia, daughter of Matteo Micaglia from Peschici and Isabella Sabatello.»

Because of his knowledge of Croatian, Micaglia was dispatched to the Republic of Ragusa by the Jesuit order. It was the time of Counter-Reformation and the Catholic Church wished to restore its power in the Balkans as well. For four years (1630–1633) he taught grammar at the Jesuit College in Ragusa (Dubrovnik). There he wrote "Latin grammar for Illyrian students" after Emanuel Alvares (De institutione grammatica pro Illyricis accommodata, 1637).

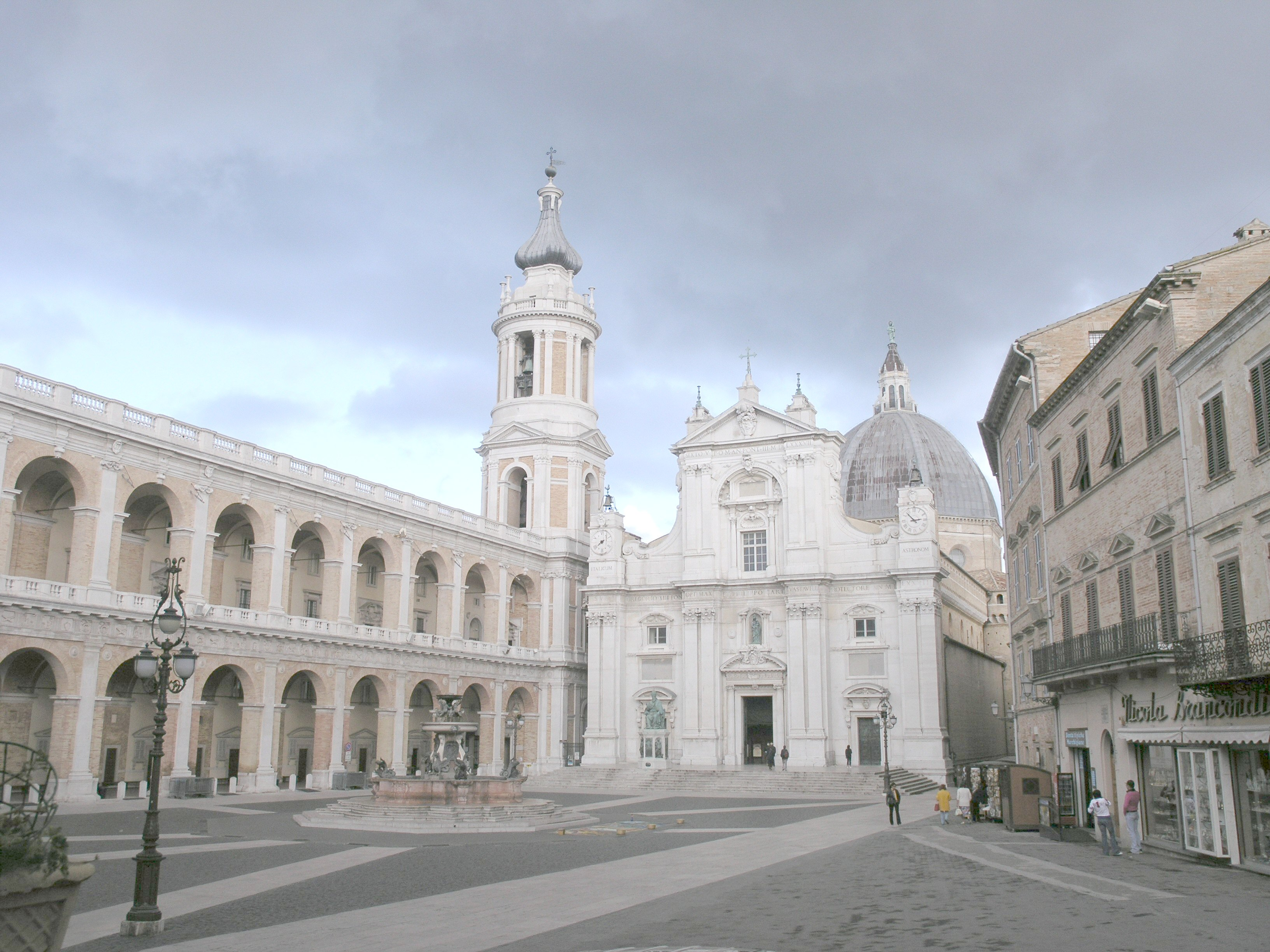
View of the Loreto Basilica, where Micaglia spent his last years.

A few years later, in 1636, Micaglia sent a letter to the Sacred Congregation for the Propagation of the Faith, proposing a reform of the Latin alphabet for the needs of Croatian. He discussed the same issue in the chapter "On Slavic Orthography" of his work in Croatian "God-Loving Thoughts on the Lord's Prayer Taken from the Books of St. Thomas Aquinas, the Angelic Doctor" (Bratislava, 1642).

From 1637 to 1645 he was a missionary among the Catholics in Timișoara in the Banat (present day Romania). He came back to Italy, where he was confessor in Slavic languages at the Basilica della Santa Casa in Loreto, from 1645 till his death in that town.

== Dictionary ==
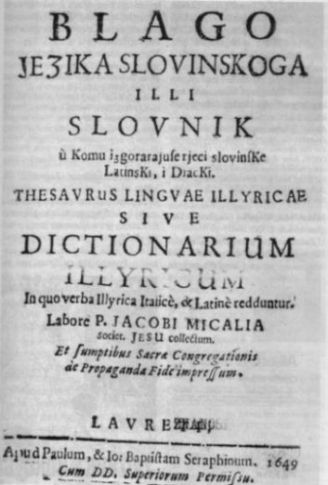
Micaglia's dictionary

Micaglia's greatest work is Thesaurus of Slovinian Language and Slovinian Dictionary. It was first printed in Loreto in 1649, but a better printing press was needed, so it was completed in Ancona in 1651. The dictionary was a Jesuit project, an instrument to fight the Protestant Reformation and even more the progression of the Muslim faith in the Balkans.

It was the first Croatian dictionary, with Croatian (under name of "Illyric" or "Slovinian") as the starting language (in the very same dictionary, he treats the terms Croatian, Slovinian and Illyric as synonyms). An important thing to note is that in his dictionary Micaglia names Croatian as "Illyric" or "Slovinian", and Italian as "Latin", which he names as the "students' language" (diacki). The introduction to the dictionary has a "Latin" dedication, a note to the reader in Italian (Al benigno lettore), a presentation of the alphabet and orthography in Latin and Croatian (Od ortographie jezika slovinskoga ili načina od pisanja), and an Italian grammar in Croatian (Grammatika Talianska).

Micaglia explains in the foreword that he chose the Bosnian dialect because "everyone says that the Bosnian language is the most beautiful one" ("Ogn'un dice che la lingua Bosnese sia la piu bella"). Bosnian is identified as the Shtokavian dialect of the local South Slavic languages. The dictionary, intended primarily to teach students and young Jesuits, has around 25,000 words. It belongs to the corpse of dictionaries in the Shtokavian dialect, with some Chakavian parts, and even the Kaykavian lexic as an entry or synonym. Mikalja's dictionary is regarded as a Croatian dictionary by mainstream lexicographers and linguists.

Micaglia's thesaurus is a trilingual dictionary in which the entry column is, though, organised as a monolingual dictionary: with a sequence of synonyms founded on dialectical contrasts, as well as definitions, and hyperonims as explanations. Thus, Štokavian-Čakavian terms are accompanied by Bosnian Franciscan words, turcisms, Raguseisms and Croatian words. It has thus been said to illustrate the lexical wealth of the "Illyrian regions".

From the cultural point of view, Micaglia's work was influenced by earlier works of Fausto Veranzio and Bartolomeo Cassio. It influenced the Croatian circle of lexicographers (among them Franciscans Divković, Toma Babić and Lovro Šitović), both in Croatia and in Bosnia and Herzegovina. His work is integral to development and standardization of Croatian modern language.

== Works ==
- Thesaurus linguae Illyricae sive Dictionarium Illyricum. In quo verba Illyrica Italice, et Latine redduntur, Romae: et sumptibus Sacrae congregationis de propaganda fide impressum, Loreto, apud Paulum et Io. Baptistam Seraphinum, 1649 (Thesaurus of Croatian or a Croatian Dictionary, in Which Croatian Words Are Translated into Italian and Latin) (Ancona, 1651). Blago jezika slovinskoga ili Slovnik u Komu izgovarajuse rjeci slovinske Latinski, i Diacki.
- Bogoljubno razmiscgljanje od ocenascja Pokupgljeno iz kgniga Svetoga Tomme od Aquina Nauciteglja Anghjelskoga (God-Loving Thoughts on the Lord's Prayer Taken from the Books of St Thomas Aquinas, the Angelic Doctor, Bratislava, 1642)

Printing of the "Thesaurus" was started by Serafini brothers in Loreto in 1649, and completed by O. Beltrano in Ancona in 1651.

== Bibliography ==
- Max L. Baeumer, The Emergence of national languages Vol 11 Longo, 1984 (in English)
- Croatian Academy of America, Journal of Croatian studies, p. 286 Volumes 36-37, 1997 (in Croatian and English)
- Sylvain Auroux, History of the language sciences: an international handbook on the evolution of the study of language from the beginnings to the present Volume 1, Walter de Gruyter, 2000, ISBN 978-3-11-011103-3 (in English and German)
- Wiener slavistisches Jahrbuch, Volume 36 Verlag der Österreichischen Akademie der Wissenschaften, 1990 (in English and German)
- A. Tamaro, La Vénétie Julienne et la Dalmatie: histoire de la nation italienne sur ses frontières orientales, Page 233 Volume 3, Imprimerie du Sénat, 1919 (in French)
- Ivo Banac, Hrvatsko jezično pitanje Vol. 6, p. 43, of Mladost, 1991, ISBN 978-86-7649-003-5 (in Croatian)
- Edward L. Keenan, Josef Dobrovský and the origins of the Igor' tale Harvard University Press ISBN 978-0-916458-96-6
