= Swimming suffragists =

Effort to promote women's rights

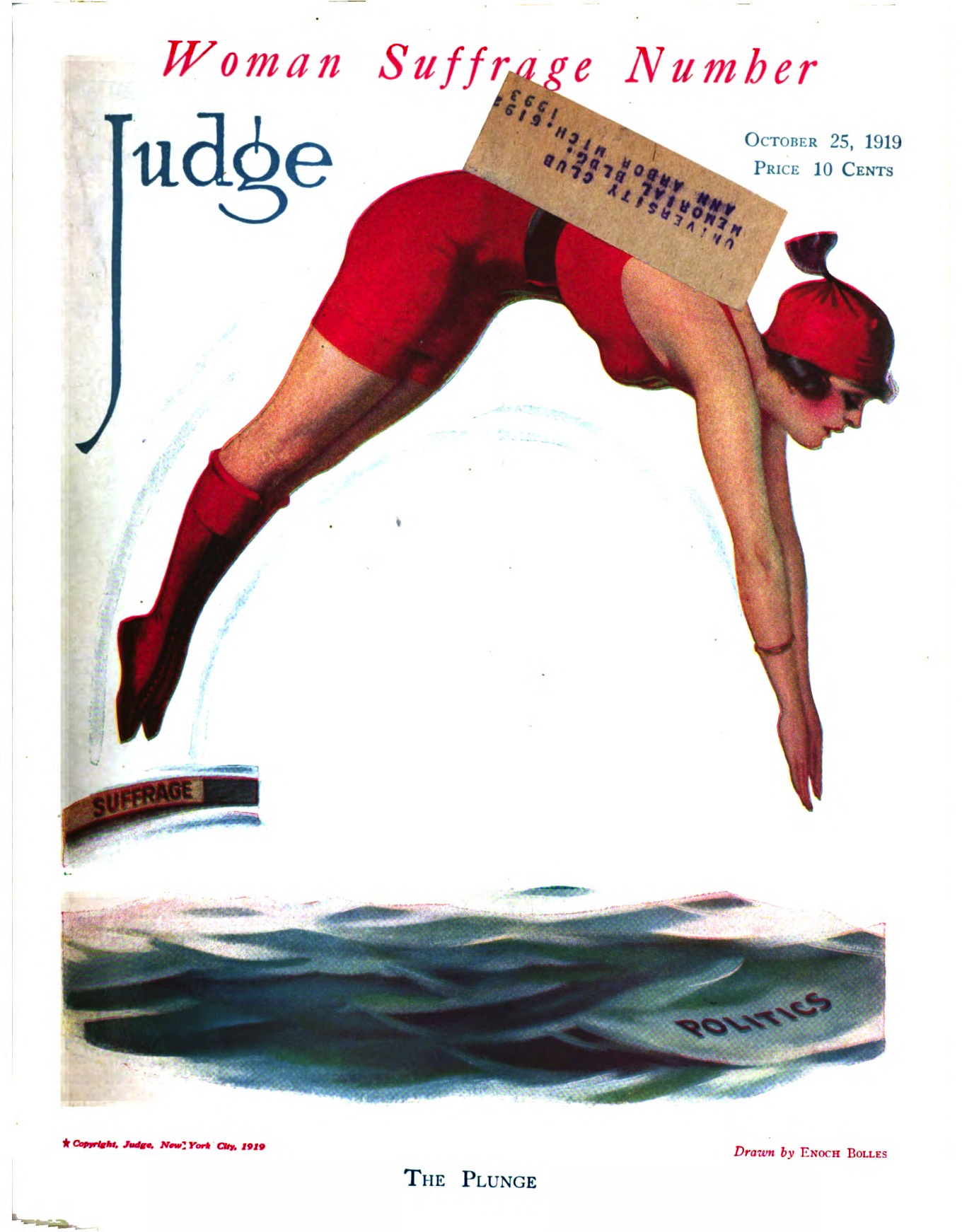
1919 magazine cover illustrating a woman's 'plunge' into suffrage politics

Swimming suffragists (or swimming suffragettes) was the name for women who opposed the social norms that enforced restrictions on both what a woman could wear for public swimming as well as a woman's right to vote. They were active in the 1910s and 1920s across both America and England, culminating in a greater ability of women to wear bathing suits in public and achieving the right to vote with the passing of the Nineteenth Amendment in the United States and reforms passed in the United Kingdom in both 1918 and 1928.

== History ==
In the early 1900s, public pools and beaches required women to wear a full-body "swimming costume". Public opinion at the time expected women to be covered "from head to toe" in swimwear that was made of heavy wool and included shoes. In 1906, professional swimmer Annette Kellerman was arrested in the city of Boston for "showing too much of her arms and legs while wearing a one-piece bathing suit". In 1911, swimming coach Charlotte Epstein established the National Women's Life Saving League (NWLSL) in an effort to improve safety for girls and women in the water. She argued strongly against the push for women to wear stockings that covered their legs, as it would hamper a woman's ability to swim and impede their safety in the water.

1914 saw a suffrage protest in Hyde Park, London, where a group of women wore robes spelling out the word 'suffrage'. They removed the robes to reveal their bathing suits, and were arrested by police. Epstein and the NWLSL staged a similar protest a year later at Manhattan Beach in New York City. A group of swimmers wore sashes reading "Votes For Women" and they competed in a swim race to rescue a mannequin wearing an "Anti-Suffrage" sash. Epstein went on to found the Women's Swimming Association (WSA) in 1917, an organization dedicated to teaching swimming skills to women. Epstein also convinced the Amateur Athletic Union to recognize women's sports and allow women's swimming in the Olympics.

The overlap between women fighting for freedom to swim at the same time as they fought for the right to vote earned them the nickname "swimming suffragists". Author Jenny Landreth stated: "There is a direct link between suffrage and other rights for women, a correlation between our participation in voting and our fight for swimming equality." Olympic gold-medalist Tiffany Cohen described swimmers like Kellerman as "pioneers". The Nineteenth Amendment was ratified in August 1920, recognizing the right of women in the United States to vote. The United Kingdom granted voting rights to women over the age of 30 with the passage of the Representation of the People Act 1918 followed by granting voting rights to women over the age of 21 with the passage of the Representation of the People Act 1928.

== See also ==
- History of swimming
- History of swimwear
- Women's suffrage in the United Kingdom
- Women's suffrage in the United States
