= Melchisédech Thévenot =

French author, scientist, traveller, cartographer, inventor, and diplomat (1620-1692)

- Born: Nicolas Thévenot; About 1620
- Died: 29 October 1692; Issy-les-Moulineaux, Hauts-de-Seine
- Other name: Melchisédec Thévenot
- Known for: The Art of Swimming (1696)
- Relatives: Jean de Thévenot, nephew
- Scientific career
- Fields: Scientist, traveller, cartographer, orientalist, inventor, diplomat
- Workplaces: Royal Librarian to Louis XIV

Melchisédech or Melchisédec Thévenot (English: /ˈtɛvənoʊ/ TE-və-noh, French: [mɛlkizedɛk tevəno]; c. 1620 – 29 October 1692) was a French writer, scientist, traveller, cartographer, orientalist, inventor, and diplomat. He was the inventor of the spirit level and is also famous for his popular posthumously published 1696 book The Art of Swimming, one of the first books on the subject and widely read during the 18th century. Benjamin Franklin, an avid swimmer in his youth, is known to have read it. The book popularized the breaststroke (see History of swimming); he was inducted into the International Swimming Hall of Fame in 1990. He also influenced the founding of the Académie Royale des Sciences (the French Academy of Sciences).

== Life ==
Thévenot came from a family of royal office holders (nobles of the robe), which partly explains his wealth. He was reputed to speak English, Greek, Latin, Hebrew, and several oriental languages, including Arabic and Turkish. Thévenot's baptismal name was Nicolas, Melchisédech being added as the second (confirmation) name, almost certainly in honour of his maternal grandfather, Melchisédech Garnier (d. 1637), an avocat at the Parlement of Paris, and probably a Huguenot, given the Old Testament, Genesis 14:18 name.

Thévenot was an amateur scientist and a patron of many scientists and mathematicians, maintaining correspondence with figures like Jan Swammerdam, who he encouraged to tackle the origin of organisms. He was wealthy and well-connected, in 1684 becoming the Royal Librarian to King Louis XIV. He served as ambassador to Genoa in 1647 and then to Rome in the 1650s. After the death of Pope Innocent X, he participated in the subsequent conclave. He died at Issy.

== Scientific studies ==
Thévenot studied astronomy, physics, medicine, and magnetism, and demonstrated in the 1660s the possibility that atmospheric pulsations had something to do with human and animal respiration. Between 1658 and 1661 Thévenot conducted experiments on capillarity and the siphon. He proposed the use of lemon juice as a cure for various maladies, as well as syrup of ipecac as a remedy for dysentery.

Thévenot can be credited in sponsoring a scientific study that contributed to the discovery of the nature and mechanism of fertilization both in humans and in animals in general. In April 1665, he wrote to his friend Christiaan Huygens (1629–95), a Dutch mathematician and astronomer:

We took the opportunity provided by the cold of recent months and applied ourselves to dissections and to investigating the generation of animals (Thévenot 1665).

The "we" referred to two of Thévenot's protégés, the Dutchman Jan Swammerdam (1637–1680) and the Dane Niels Stensen ("Steno") (1638–86).

Thévenot invented the spirit level (or bubble level) some time before 2 February 1661, which he filled with alcohol and mounted on a stone ruler fitted with a viewing lens. This date can be established from Thévenot's correspondence with scientist Christiaan Huygens. Within a year of this date, the inventor circulated details of his invention to others, including Robert Hooke in London and Vincenzo Viviani in Florence. It is occasionally argued that these bubble levels did not come into widespread use until the beginning of the 18th century—the earliest surviving examples being from that time—but Adrien Auzout had recommended that the Académie Royale des Sciences take "levels of the Thévenot type" on its expedition to Madagascar in 1666. It is very likely that these levels were in use in France and elsewhere long before the beginning of the 18th century.

== Other works ==
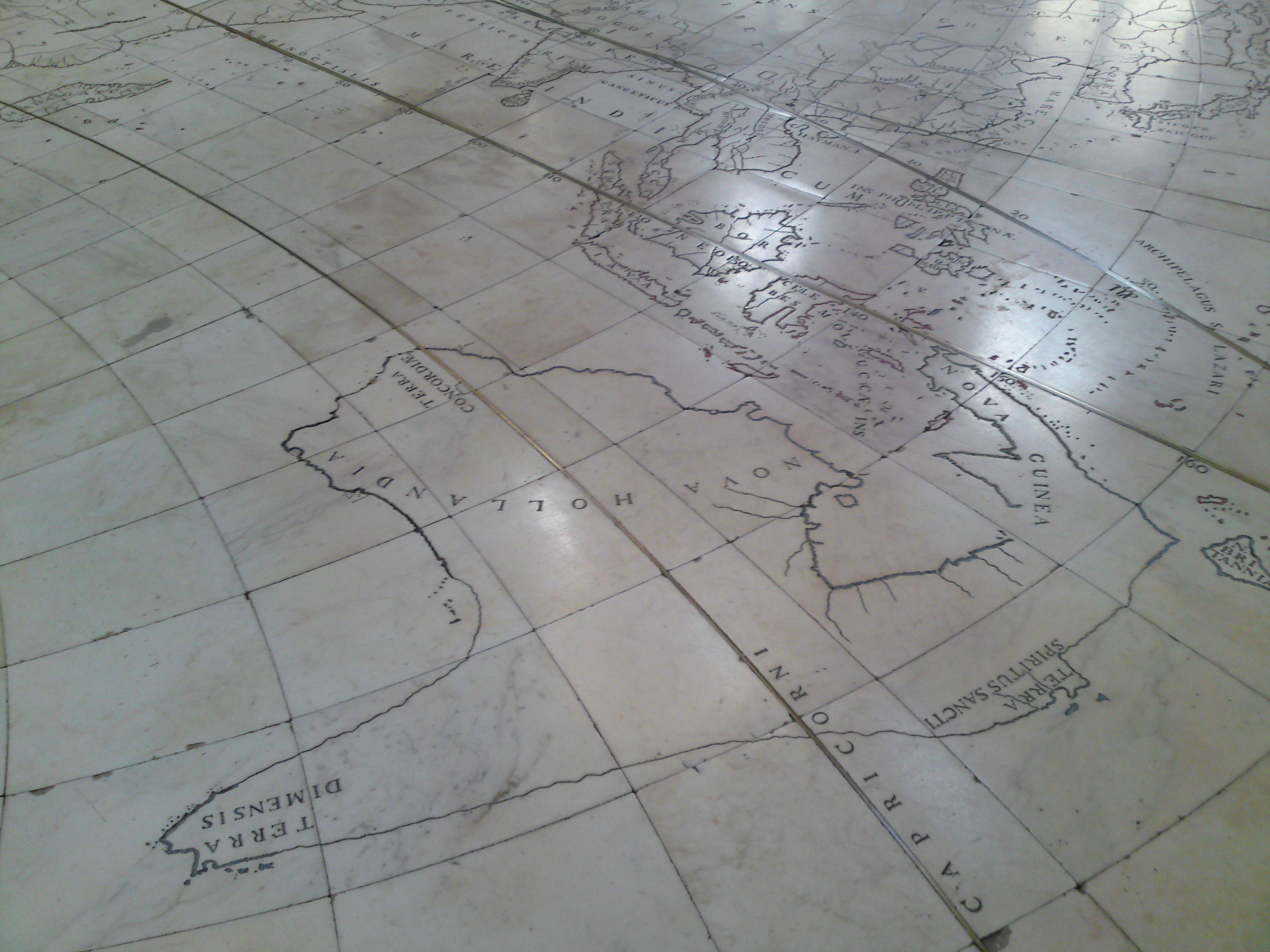
A photo of the marble floor inlaid into the Amsterdam Town Hall showing Nova Hollandia and Terra Dimensis – the inlayer incorrectly connected the two, while the original Blaeu map shows the gap.

Many of Thévenot's maps of the Middle East were published in his Relations de Divers Voyages Curieux, a collection of translations of voyages of discovery (such as that of Cosmas Indicopleustes). One of these was one of the earliest and most detailed depictions of southern Iraq (his nephew Jean de Thévenot later visited this region). Thévenot makes reference to the Mandaeans of the Basra region, and includes a printed page from one of this sect's holy books, one of the first printed appearances of the Mandaean language in Europe.

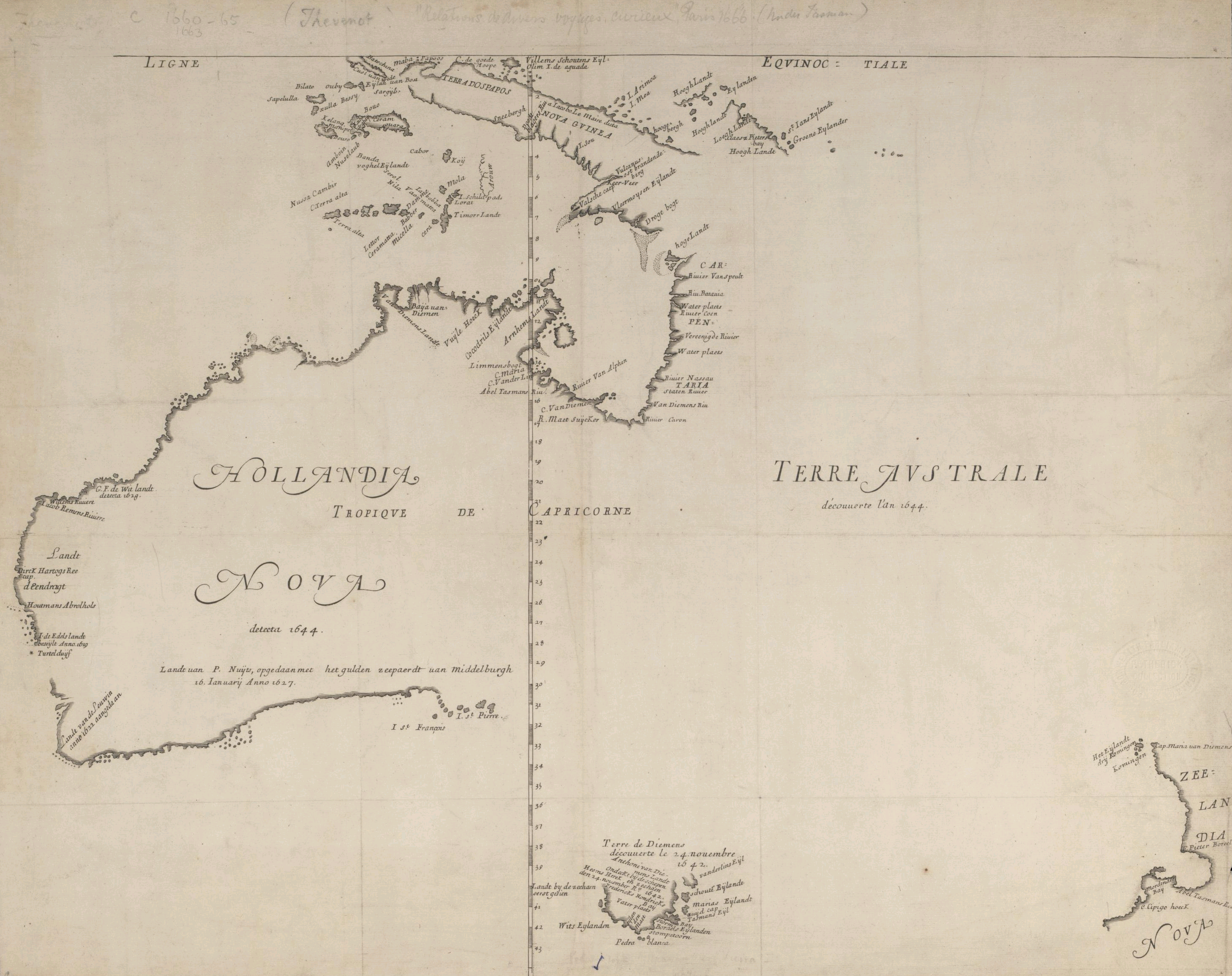
Hollandia Nova, a 1663 map from Thévenot that popularized—and probably invented—the idea of the 135th meridian east forming the eastern border of New Holland.

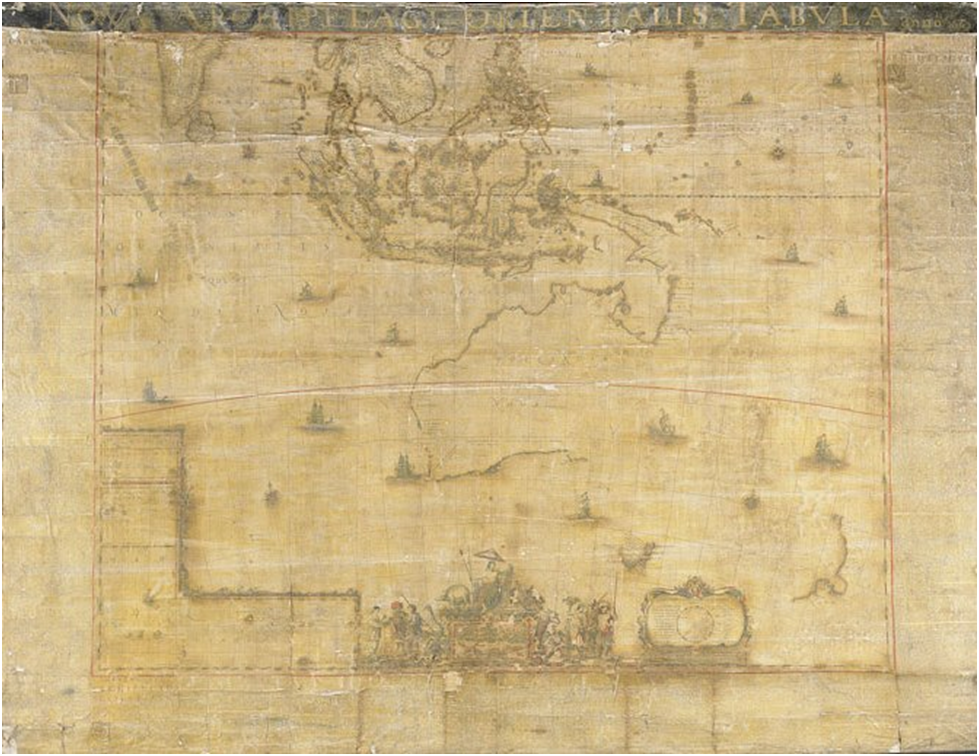
Nova Archipelagi Orientalis Tabula, J. Blaeu, 1663: "Papas landt or Nova Guinea, Nova Hollandia, discovered in the year 1644, Nova Zeelandia or New Zealand reached in 1642, Antoni van Diemens land found in the same year, Carpentaria, thus named after General Carpentier, and still other lands, partly discovered, are shown on this map."

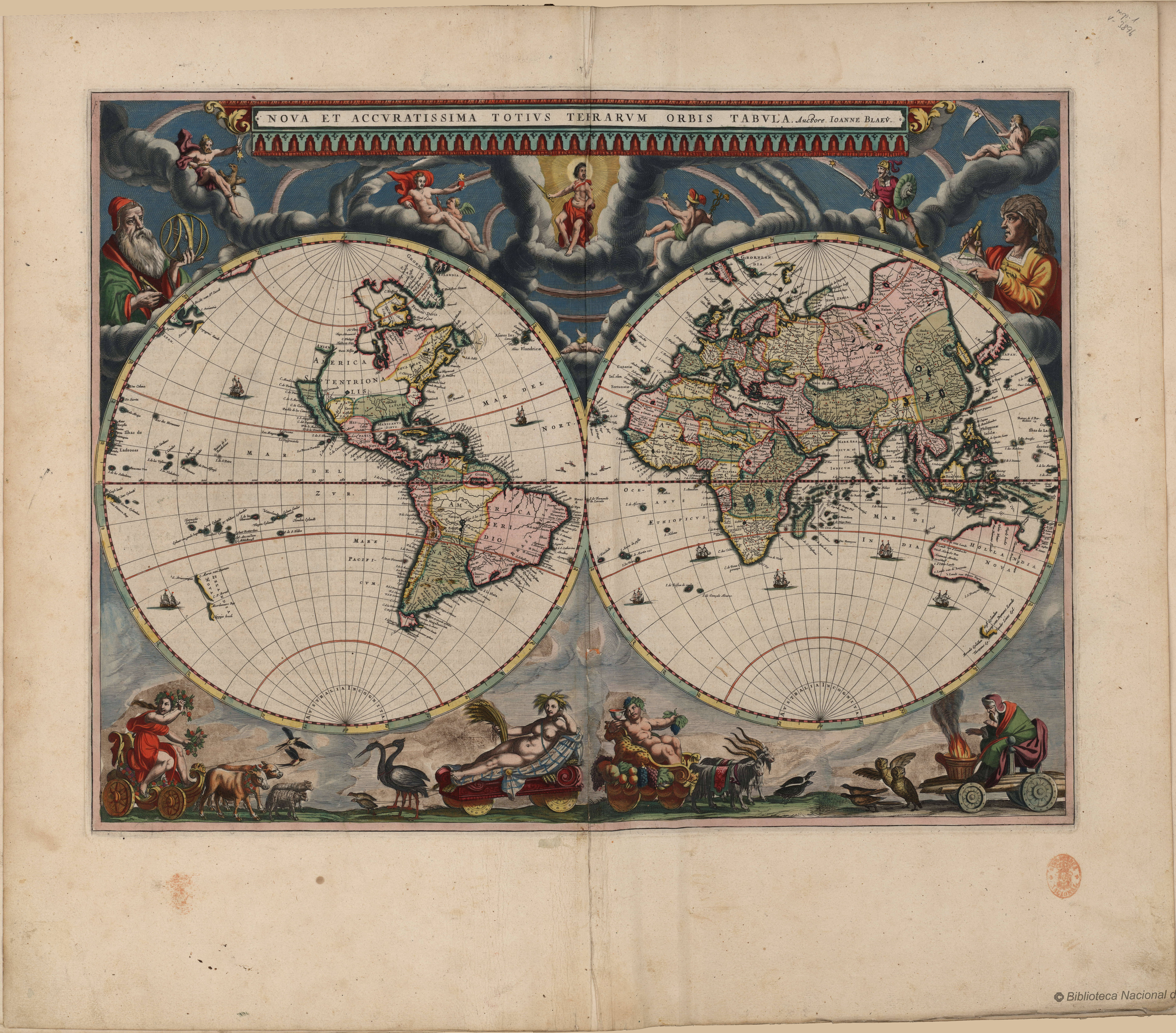
Nova et Accuratissima Terrarum Orbis Tabula, J. Blaeu, 1664.

The map by Thévenot, Hollandia Nova—Terre Australe in the Relation de Divers Voyages, is a French version of the 1644 chart of Abel Tasman's discoveries using information from Dutch sources, notably Joan Blaeu's world map published in 1659. Although Thévenot said that he had taken his chart from the one inlaid into the floor of the Amsterdam Town Hall, in fact it appears to be an almost exact copy of that of Joan Blaeu in his Archipelagus Orientalis sive Asiaticus published in 1659 in the Kurfürsten Atlas (“Atlas of the Great Elector“).

The map of the world set into the floor of the great hall of the Amsterdam Town Hall was drawn from Blaeu's world map of 1648. Once Blaeu's map of the world appeared other mapmakers, such as Thévenot, copied his depiction of New Holland. Hollandia Nova in the Kurfürsten Atlas is shown as it appears in Blaeu's world map of 1648, Nova et Accuratissima Terrarum Orbis Tabula. Thévenot divided the continent in two, between Nova Hollandia to the west and Terre Australe to the east of a latitude staff running down the meridian equivalent to longitude 135 degrees East of Greenwich.

The differentiation between Nova Hollandia to the west and Terre Australe to the east of the meridian corresponding to 135° East of Greenwich, emphasized by the latitude staff running down that meridian, appears to have been an initiative of Thevenot's, as there is no such division on Blaeu's map or on the Amsterdam Town Hall map. This apparent division may have been fortuitous, as on other Dutch maps of this period Terra Australis or t'Zuid Landt ("the South Land") appears with the name, Hollandia Nova as an alternative name for the whole country.

The meridian staff dividing Nova Hollandia from Terre Australe on Thévenot's map fell along the meridian that represented the western limit of Spain's imperial claim in the South Pacific arising from the Treaty of Tordesillas of 1494 and act of possession of the South Land made by Pedro Fernández de Quirós in 1606. This western limit of Spain's claim is shown on the 1761 map of the Spanish Empire by Vicente de Memije, Aspecto Symbolico del Mundo Hispanico.

Emanuel Bowen reproduced Thévenot's map in his Complete System of Geography (London, 1747), re-titling it A Complete Map of the Southern Continent and adding three inscriptions promoting the benefits of exploring and colonizing the country. One inscription said:

It is impossible to conceive a Country that promises fairer from its Situation than this of TERRA AUSTRALIS, no longer incognita, as this Map demonstrates, but the Southern Continent Discovered. It lies precisely in the richest climates of the World... and therefore whoever perfectly discovers and settles it will become infalliably possessed of Territories as Rich, as fruitful, and as capable of Improvement, as any that have hitherto been found out, either in the East Indies or the West.

Bowen's map was re-published in John Campbell's editions of John Harris's Navigantium atque Itinerantium Bibliotheca, or Voyages and Travels (1744–1748, and 1764). When drawing up the territorial boundaries of the colony of New South Wales, established in 1788, the British government set its western boundary at the meridian of 135° East of Greenwich, as it appeared on Thévenot's chart.

Thévenot is often confused with his nephew, the traveller Jean de Thévenot. There is evidence to suggest that both Huygens and Hooke later laid claim to the invention of the spirit level, although only within their own countries. There is no surviving portrait of Thévenot, and an alleged portrait of him (such as can be seen in Gerrit Lindeboom's edition of Thévenot's letters to Swammerdam) is actually of his nephew Jean.

== Significant works ==
- Thévenot, Melchisédech (1664). Relations de Divers Voyages Curieux (in French). Paris: Iacques Langlois. OCLC 1052538974. OL 33206638M. Wikidata Q130632460.
