= Girolamo Germano =

Italian philologist (1568–1632)

Girolamo Germano SJ (Latin: Hieronymus Germanus; Palermo, 1568 – 27 December 1632) was an Italian Jesuit, Greek scholar and philologist.

== Biography ==
There is little information for the life of Girolamo Germano. One of the few things known is that he was admitted into the Society of Jesus in 1586 at the age of 18. For eight years he taught classical languages and literature in the colleges of the Society, before being sent to the island of Chios where the Jesuits had settled since 1590. Chios had been under Ottoman rule since 1566. He lived in Chios for 22 years where he carried out his priestly work. During this period, he authored of his famous Italian and Greek Vocabulary, with intention to help all the Italian natives that were going to live in Chios, as his fellow Jesuit priests/monks. Hence there are many cases of word idioms that were used by Chiots. This book is significant for both the phonetic and morphological level as well as the lexicographical. However, it was only available in very few libraries until 1907, when Hubert Pernot republished it, adding a detailed introduction to the history of modern Greek grammar and lexicography. Germano is considered one of the most important neo-Greek philologists of the early modern age and the first that authored a dictionary in new Greek.

== Works ==
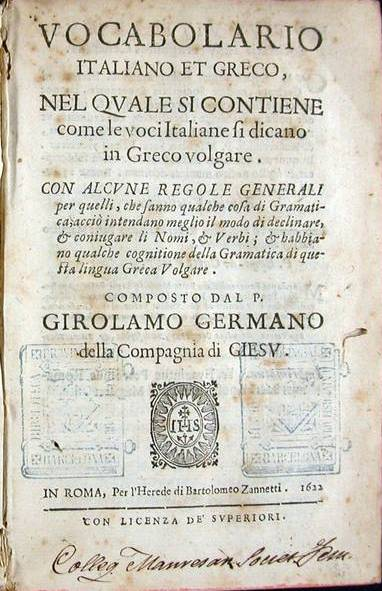
Girolamo Germano SJ: Vocabolario italiano et greco, Rome 1622

- Italian and Greek vocabulary (Vocabolario italiano et greco), which contains the pronunciation of vulgar Greek in Italian. With some general grammatical rules for those who know little grammar, so that they could understand better the way the conjugation of nouns, verbs & have some knowledge of the grammar of the vulgar Greek language. Written by fr. Girolamo Germano of the Society of Jesus. Published in Rome by Bartolomeo Zannetti's heir (1622).

== Bibliography ==
- Mongitore, Antonio (1707). "Hieronymus Germanus". Bibliotheca Sicula sive De Scriptoribus Siculis (in Latin). Vol. Tomus Primus. Palermo: Ex Typographia Didaci Bua. p. 277.
- Hubert Pernot (1907). Girolamo Germano, Grammaire et vocabulaire du grec vulgaire publiés d'après l'édition de 1622 (in French). Fontenay-sous-Bois.
- "Recensione di R. Bousquet". Échos d'Orient (in French). 11 (72): 17–318. 1908.
- Sommervogel, Carlos (1890). Bibliothèque de la Compagnie de Jésus. Vol. 1. Bruxelles/Parigi. p. 2094.
