= Stjepan Babić =

Croatian linguist and academic (1925–2021)

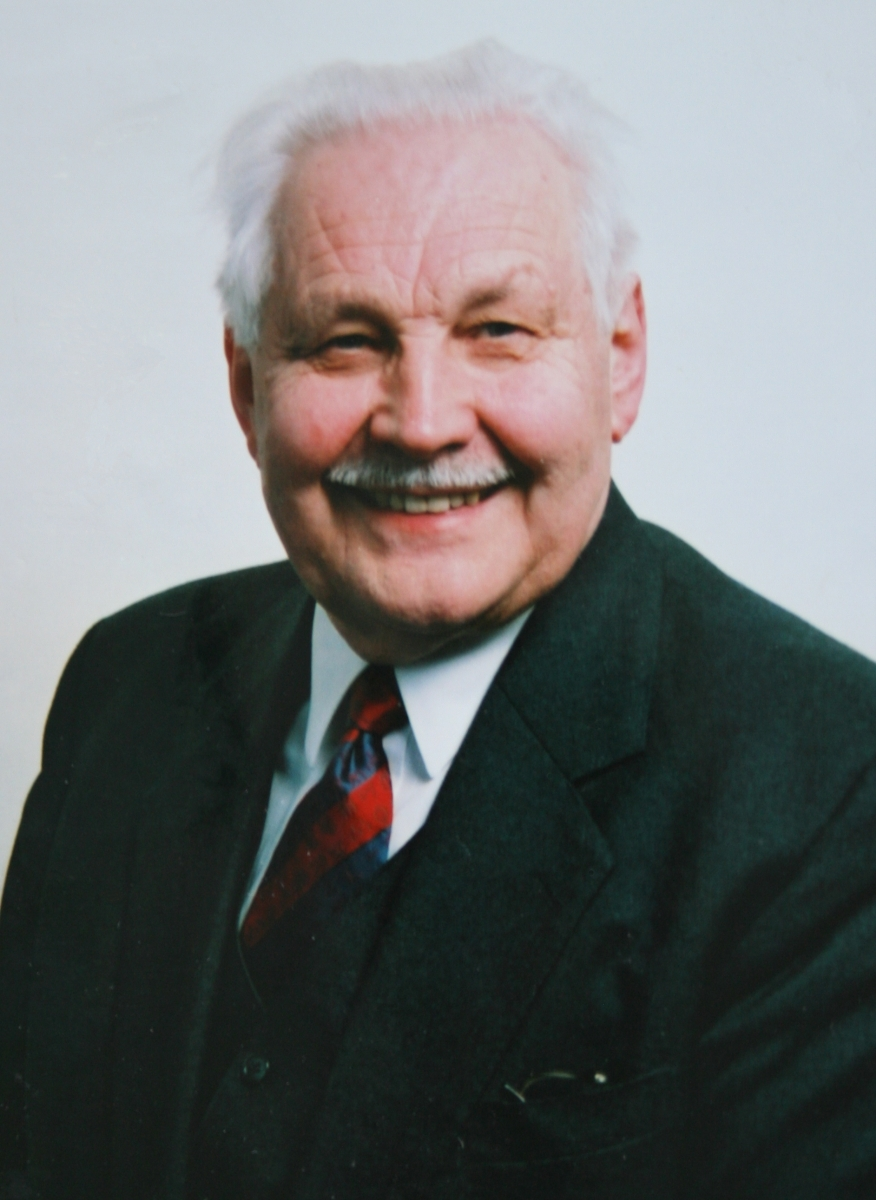
- Born: 29 November 1925; Oriovac, Kingdom of Serbs, Croats, and Slovenes
- Died: 27 August 2021 (aged 95); Zagreb, Croatia
- Occupation: Linguist

Academic background
- Education: University of Zagreb

Stjepan Babić (29 November 1925 – 27 August 2021) was a Croatian linguist and academic.

== Biography ==
Babić was born in the small town of Oriovac in Brod-Posavina County, even though his biological parents are from Hrvatsko Zagorje. He attended primary school in Oriovac, and gymnasium in Slavonski Brod, Osijek and finally in Zagreb. In 1948, he was employed by Industrogradnja, but soon thereafter the political winds threw him to Petrinjska prison. After Petrinjska, he enrolled to Faculty of Philosophy at the University of Zagreb in 1949, graduating in 1955 with a degree in Croatian, Russian and German. Afterwards, he remained working as an assistant at the Faculty of Philosophy, defending his PhD in 1962 and receiving full professorship in 1975. He was the vice-president of Matica hrvatska from 1989 to 1992, and representative in the Županijski Dom ('Chamber of the Counties') from 1993 to 1997. He retired as professor in 1991. Babić died in Zagreb on 27 August 2021, at the age of 95.

== Selected works ==
Babić was one of the most prolific Croatian linguists, with over one thousand published works (books, articles, etc.). His work deals predominantly with modern Croatian standard language, word formation in particular. In his papers published during the 1960s, Babić advocated a linguistic unification of Serbs and Croats. Since the 1990s, Babić has been one of the leading proponents of language purism in Croatia. His puristic approach has been criticised by Ivo Pranjković and especially by Snježana Kordić. Babić's tendency to use the topic of language to spread nationalist ideology was evident in his articles published in the journal Jezik, in which Babić was editor-in-chief.

This listing includes only books:

- "Hrvatski pravopis" (co-authored with Božidar Finka and Milan Moguš) 1. edition was outlawed in 1971 (reprints: London 1972, Zagreb 1990.), 2 1994, 3 1995, 4 1996, 5 2000, 6 2002, 7 2003
- "Pregled gramatike hrvatskoga književnog jezika" (co-authored with Stjepko Težak) 1973 (later editions are called "Gramatika hrvatskoga jezika", such as that of 1992. (7. ed.), 2000. (12. ed.): "Gramatika hrvatskoga jezika : priručnik za osnovno jezično obrazovanje")
- "Tvorba riječi u hrvatskom književnom jeziku" 1 (an outline for the grammar) 1986, 2 1991, 3 2002
- "Opća i slavenska terminološka problematika" 1987
- "Hrvatska jezikoslovna čitanka" 1990
- "Hrvatski jezik u političkom vrtlogu" 1990
- "Povijesni pregled, glasovi i oblici hrvatskoga književnog jezika" 1991
- "Tisućljetni jezik naš hrvatski" 1991
- "Hrvatski jučer i danas" 1995
- "Hrvatski politički vicevi" 1995
- "Sročnost u hrvatskome književnome jeziku" 1998
- "Crvena magla", novel 2000
- "Vedre priče", short stories 2000
- "Hrvatska jezikoslovna prenja" 2001
- "Prijedlog za ukidanje hrvatskog jezika" 2003
- "Hrvanja hrvatskoga : hrvatski u koštacu sa srpskim i u klinču s engleskim" 2004
- "Hrvatski školski pravopis" (co-authored with Sanda Ham and Milan Moguš) 2005
- "Temelji Hrvatskomu pravopisu" 2005
- "Razmišljanja o Bogu i patnji" 2005
- "Glasovi i oblici hrvatskoga književnoga jezika" 2007
- "Rječnik kratica" (co-authored with Milena Žic-Fuchs) 2007
