= Giovanni Francesco Fortunio =

Italian grammarian, jurist and humanist

Giovanni Francesco Fortunio (Zadar or Pordenone, ca. 1470 – Fano, 1517) was an Italian grammarian, jurist and humanist.

== Biography ==
He is especially remembered for having printed in 1516, the first ever Italian grammar book with the title Regole grammaticali della volgar lingua. It contains a morphological and orthographical analysis of the Tuscan vernacular based upon works by Dante Alighieri, Francesco Petrarca and Giovanni Boccaccio.

He was also an important politician and vicarian.

== Bibliography ==
- A. Benedetti, Giovanni Francesco Fortunio umanista e primo grammatico della lingua italiana, Pordenone, s.d.
