= Radoslav Katičić =

Croatian linguist (1930–2019)

- Born: 3 July 1930; Zagreb, Yugoslavia (now Croatia)
- Died: 10 August 2019 (aged 89); Vienna, Austria

Philosophical work
- Main interests: Slavic studies Comparative linguistics Croatian studies Slavic mythology Indology; Classical philology

Radoslav Katičić (pronounced [rǎdoslaʋ kâtitʃitɕ]; 3 July 1930 – 10 August 2019) was a Croatian and Yugoslav linguist, classical philologist, Indo-Europeanist, Slavist and Indologist, one of the most prominent Croatian scholars in the humanities.

== Biography ==
Radoslav Katičić was born on 3 July 1930 in Zagreb, which was part of Kingdom of Yugoslavia at the time. In 1949, he graduated at the classical gymnasium in his home town.

At the Faculty of Humanities and Social Sciences, University of Zagreb, he received a degree in Classical Philology in 1954. The same year he started working as a part-time librarian at the Seminar for Classical Philology at the same faculty. His first scientific works were on Ancient Greek philology and Byzantine studies.

As a stipendist of the Greek government, he visited Athens in 1956-57, and in 1958 he was elected as an assistant at the Department for Comparative Indo-European Grammar at the Faculty of Humanities and Social Sciences in Zagreb.

In 1959, he received his Ph.D. with the thesis Pitanje jedinstva indoeuropske glagolske fleksije ('The question of unity of Indo-European verbal flexion'). During the period of 1960-61, he was a stipendist of the Alexander von Humboldt Foundation in Tübingen. After returning to his main university, he became a docent on Indo-European and general linguistics. Soon after, he served as a head of the newly formed Department for General Linguistics and Oriental Studies. In 1966, he became an associate, and, in 1973, a full professor. Beside general and Indo-European linguistics, he also taught Old Iranian and Old Indic philology.

In 1976, he became a full professor of Slavic philology at the University of Vienna, Austria.

In 1973, he was selected as an extraordinary member of the Yugoslav Academy of Sciences and Arts (now Croatian Academy of Sciences and Arts), and, in 1987, he became a full member. In 1981, he became a corresponding member of the Austrian Academy of Sciences, in 1989, becoming a full member, and since 1989, serving as a head of the renowned Balkan Commission. In 1984, he became a member of the Academy of Sciences and Arts of Bosnia and Herzegovina, in 1987, a member of the Norwegian Academy of Science and Letters, and in 1991, a member of the Academia Europaea. In 2011, he became a member of Accademia Nazionale dei Lincei and in 2012, of Academy of Sciences and Arts of Kosovo. In 1989, he received an honorary doctorate from the University of Osijek, and in 1999, an honorary degree and professorship at the Eötvös Loránd University in Budapest.

In 2005, he became the head of Council for Standard Croatian Language Norm. He served in that role until council's abolition in 2012.

== Work ==
In the past twenty years he chiefly researched on the topic of history of Croatian grammar, philology, early Croatian Middle Ages, engaging in extensive synthetic research of the key periods of history of Croatian literature and the reconstruction of Proto-Slavic ceremonial texts, sacral poetry of mythological content, and legislative literature. Some aspects of his work have met with criticism, primarily his puristic approach to linguistic terminology, his primordialist view of nations, and his subjectivity in articles on language policy. Besides, his syntactic description has been judged negatively by other Croatian syntacticians.

Katičić's scholarly contributions which consists of more than 150 titles (books and papers) can be divided in five fields:

- General linguistics and Paleo-Balkan studies (mainly based on transformational grammar approach), consisting of works written in English:
  - A Contribution to the General Theory of Comparative Linguistics (the Hague-Paris, 1970)
  - The Ancient Languages of the Balkans, 1-2 (the Hague-Paris, 1976)
- Linguistic-stylistic works on aspects and history of various European (Ancient Greek, Byzantine) and non-European literatures:
  - Stara indijska književnost/Old Indian literature (Zagreb, 1973)
- Numerous studies on Croatian language history, from the inception of the Croats in the 7th century onwards. Katičić has charted the meanderings in the continuity of Croatian language and literature, from the earliest stone inscriptions and Glagolitic medieval literature in the Croatian recension of Church Slavonic to the works of Renaissance writers such as Marin Držić and Marko Marulić, who wrote in a Croatian vernacular. He also explored language standardization and wrote a syntactic description of modern Croatian (Sintaksa hrvatskoga književnoga jezika/Syntax of Standard Croatian, Zagreb, 1986), based on texts by contemporary authors such as Miroslav Krleža and Tin Ujević.
- Synthetic works that explore the beginnings of Croatian civilization in a multidisciplinary fashion based on philology, archeology, culturology, paleography and textual analysis:
  - Uz početke hrvatskih početaka/Roots of Croatian roots (Split 1993)
  - Litterarium studia (Vienna-Zagreb, 1999, in German and Croatian)
- Reconstruction of Proto-Slavic sacral poetry and Slavic pre-Christian faith:
  - Božanski boj: Tragovima svetih pjesama naše pretkršćanske starine (Zagreb, 2008)
  - Zeleni lug: Tragovima svetih pjesama naše pretkršćanske starine (Zagreb, 2010)
  - Gazdarica na vratima: Tragovima svetih pjesama naše pretkršćanske starine (Zagreb, 2011)
  - Vilinska vrata: I dalje tragovima svetih pjesama naše pretkršćanske starine (Zagreb, 2014)
  - Naša stara vjera: Tragovima svetih pjesama naše pretkršćanske starine (Zagreb, 2017)
