= Sanda Ham =

Croatian linguist

- Born: 20 August 1959 (age 67); Osijek, Croatia

Academic background
- Education: University of Zagreb
- Thesis: Passive Sentence in the Contemporary Croatian Literary Language (1988)
- Doctoral advisor: Stjepan Babić

Academic work
- Discipline: Linguist
- Sub-discipline: Croatian studies
- Institutions: University of Osijek

Sanda Ham (20 August 1959) is a Croatian linguist and publicist. She is editor of the Croatian linguistic magazine Jezik.

== Personal life ==
She was born in 1959 in Osijek, where she attended elementary and grammar school as well as the Faculty of Pedagogy where she graduated in 1982. She received her postgraduate degree in linguistics (Croatian studies) at the Faculty of Humanities and Social Sciences in Zagreb in 1988. Her dissertation was on passive sentences in standard Croatian. Six years later she received a doctor's degree with a dissertation about language of Croatian novelist Josip Kozarac. Her academic mentor both in postgraduate and doctoral degree was Stjepan Babić.

== Career ==
In 2004 she became executive editor of Jezik, for which she had been a contributor since 1996. She served on the editorial board of linguistic magazine Jezikoslovlje (Linguistics) for two years. Her work has been published in Croatian literary magazines, such as Književna revija (Osijek), Filologija (Zagreb), Fluminensija (Rijeka), Riječ (Budapest), Dometi (Rijeka) and others. She writes for political magazine Hrvatski tjednik. She was elected as one of 22 Heroes of all times, people prominent and notable in their field of work, by listeners of Croatian Radio.

In 2012, Ham became subject of controversy when her email correspondence with fellow professor Dubravka Sesar was alleged to contain disparaging comments from her towards colleagues at the Faculty of Philosophy in the University of Osijek, which included comparing them to animals, accusing them of being Chetniks and using nationalistic and homophobic language against some of them.

In 2022, Ham once again attracted controversy while guesting on a Z1 show where she advocated for adding Croatian translation and subtitles for Bosnian, Montenegrin and Serbian television shows such as Lud, zbunjen, normalan regardless of the fact that Croats would understand the shows without it, which was seen as pointless and hurtful rhetoric by fellow linguists such as Željko Jozić.

In 2025, a year after retiring from the University of Osijek, a notion was filed by professors Helena Sablić Tomić, Lada Badurina, Anđela Frančić, Bernadina Petrović and Blaženka Martinović for the university to grant Ham emerita status. However, all members of the university's council (of which there are around 130) voted against this notion.

== Publications ==
- Jezik zagrebačke filološke škole, Matica hrvatska, Osijek (1998)
- Školska gramatika hrvatskoga jezika, Školska knjiga, Zagreb (2002, 2nd edition - 2007, 3rd edition - 2009, 4th edition - 2012, 5th edition - 2017)
- Hrvatski školski pravopis (coauthors Stjepan Babić and Milan Moguš), Školska knjiga, Zagreb (2005, 2nd edition - 2008, 3rd edition - 2009, 4th edition - 2012)
- Povijest hrvatskih gramatika, Globus, Zagreb (2006)
- Hrvatski jezični savjeti (coauthors Jadranka Mlikota, Borko Barban and Alen Orlić), Školska knjiga, Zagreb (2014)
- Po jeziku Hrvati, Školska knjiga, Zagreb (2022)
