= Francisco Blancas de San José =

Established first printing press in the Philippines

Francisco Blancas de San José (c. 1556–1614) was a Dominican friar who played a prominent role in the history of printing and publishing in the Philippines during the early 17th century, contributing to the development of these practices in the region.

== Biography ==
Francisco Blancas de San José was born around 1556 in Tarazona, Spain to Francisco Blancas, a merchant, and Ana Angel. He exhibited remarkable intelligence from a young age. By seven, he could read and write, prompting his parents to send him to the University of Alcalá at the age of thirteen. Two years later, influenced by a Dominican sermon, he abandoned his second year of Arts and joined the convent of the Mother of God in Alcalá de Henares.

Completing his novitiate in 1572, Blancas was assigned to the convent of Santa Cruz de Segovia. Despite not being ordained, his academic success led to a role teaching arts in the convent of Piedrahíta (Ávila). However, his true calling lay in the pulpit, and with approval from superiors, he transitioned to preaching. Renowned for his clarity and substance, he quickly gained acclaim, even at a young age.

In 1594, Fray Miguel de Benavides encountered Blancas as he prepared for the third expedition of friars to the Philippines. Intrigued by the challenge, Blancas joined the expedition, departing on July 21 and arriving in Manila on June 12, 1595, after navigating through Mexico.

Recognizing Blancas's value, superiors assigned him to the province of Bataan. He dedicated himself to learning Tagalog for effective evangelization, becoming a proficient connoisseur of the language. Blancas contributed to the Christianization of native customs, creating devotional books and songs. Unable to find a printing press in the Philippines, he collaborated with a Chinese Christian to establish the first one, solidifying his legacy as the prince of Tagalog writers and the founder of the Philippine printing press.

After various assignments, Blancas was appointed procurator of the province and definer for the 1615 General Chapter. Unfortunately, he met his demise while crossing the Pacific Ocean, marking the end of a life devoted to preaching, language preservation, and the advancement of the Christian mission in the Philippines.

== Legacy ==
He made a notable impact on the Philippines upon his arrival in 1595, coinciding with the era of Spanish colonial influence in the archipelago. Drawing upon his printing expertise acquired in Europe, he initiated the establishment of the first printing press in the Philippines, a venture with profound implications for the cultural milieu of the region.

As a Dominican friar, Blancas de San José engaged the services of the Chinese Christian Juan de Vera to devise the inaugural printing press in the Philippines. This marked a significant historical juncture, introducing the influence of the printing press on the archipelago for the first time. The press assumed a central role in the dissemination of knowledge, enabling the mass production of texts that were previously confined to handwritten manuscripts. Among Blancas de San José's notable achievements was the publication of the first Filipino books utilizing European printing technology. These early publications played a pivotal role in the evolution of a distinct Filipino literary tradition, often focusing on religious and educational themes reflective of the prevailing influences of the time.

Blancas de San José's endeavors significantly contributed to the cultivation of local literature by fostering the production and dissemination of indigenous works. His efforts played a substantial role in the preservation and promotion of the Filipino language and culture, establishing a legacy in the historical narrative of the Philippines. Francisco Blancas de San José made a significant print contribution with Arte y reglas de la lengua tagala, a grammar book of Tagalog language|Tagalog, a native language of the Philippines. Published in Bataan in 1610, this work, printed on papel de China (rice paper), was considered authoritative by missionaries, aiding in the dissemination of the Catholic faith.

== Bibliography ==
- J. Gaius, Christian Doctrine. First book printed in the Philippines, Manila, Santo Tomas, 1951
- P. Fernández, Dominicans where the sun is born, Barcelona, 1958
- E. Neira, Dominican missionaries in the Far East 1587–1835, Manila, Life Today Editions, 2000.
- Smith, John. "Print Culture in Colonial Philippines: The First Century of Hispanic Typography (1593–1698)." University of Manila Press, 2005.
- Garcia, Ma. Luisa. "Philippine Print Culture, 1680-1840s: A Comparative Perspective." Ateneo de Manila University Press, 2019.
- Blancas de San José, Francisco. "La Imprenta de Manila y Francisco Blancas de San José (1745-1819)." Historical Society of the Philippines, 1982.
