= Ivo Pranjković =

Croatian linguist

- Born: August 17, 1947 (age 78); Kotor Varoš, PR Bosnia and Herzegovina, Yugoslavia (now Bosnia and Herzegovina)
- Occupation: linguist

Ivo Pranjković (born 17 August 1947) is a Croatian linguist.

== Biography ==
Pranjković is a Bosnian Croat, born in Kotor Varoš in Bosnia and Herzegovina. After the classical secondary school in Visoko, he received a BA degree in Croatian from the Faculty of Humanities and Social Sciences at the University of Zagreb. In 1974 he became a member of the Department of Croatian at the same faculty. Today, he is a professor of standard Croatian.

As a learned linguist and philologist with a wide spectrum of interests, Pranjković made important contributions to several linguistic areas. His syntactic studies Croatian Syntax, Second Croatian Syntax and Croatian grammar (published in co-authorship with Josip Silić) are generally considered important works for the modern Croatian syntax. Other areas of his work are general linguistics, history of Croatian philology in the 19th and early 20th centuries, and the linguistic heritage of Bosnian Franciscans. This last topic was the subject of several studies of Pranjković, as well as the book Hrvatski jezik i franjevci Bosne Srebrene (Croatian and the Bosnian Franciscans), where he described the linguistic area which was crucial for the development and standardization of Croatian, but which was greatly neglected until his work.

Aside from linguistic theory and history, Pranjković engaged in many disputes and comments in the press, especially with his great rival, Stjepan Babić. His articles have been collected in several books. Pranjković has polemicized with virtually every Croatian linguist of the older generation. He has criticized their prescriptive approaches to language. However, French linguist Paul-Louis Thomas and Croatian linguist Snježana Kordić have described and criticized puristic and prescriptive tendencies even in Pranjković's publications.

As a versatile linguist, Pranjković made important contributions to stylistics.

== Works ==
- August Musić, 1989
- Adolfo Veber Tkalčević, 1993
- Kronika hrvatskoga jezikoslovlja (Chronology of Croatian Linguistics), 1993
- Hrvatska skladnja (Croatian Syntax), 1993
- Lingvistički komentari (Linguistic Comments), 1997
- Jezikoslovna sporenja (Linguistic Disputes), 1997
- Hrvatski jezik i franjevci Bosne Srebrene (Croatian and the Bosnian Franciscans), 2000
- Druga hrvatska skladnja (Second Croatian Syntax), 2001
- Jezik i beletristika (Language and Belles Lettres), 2003
- Gramatika hrvatskoga jezika (Croatian Grammar), co-author, 2006
- Sučeljavanja: Polemički dueli oko hrvatskoga jezika i pravopisa, 2008
- Ogledi o jezičnoj pravilnosti, 2010
