= Toma Babić =

Croatian writer and priest

Toma Babić (c. 1680 – 31 July 1750) was a Croatian writer and Franciscan priest living in Dalmatia (then part of the Republic of Venice). His best known work is Cvit razlika mirisa duhovnoga, popularly known as Babuša, which is a compilation of religious and philosophical poems and sayings initially published in 1726. It was the second most read book in Croatian during the 18th century after Andrija Kačić Miošić's Razgovor ugodni naroda slovinskoga. The work subsequently inspired Filip Grabovac's Cvit razgovora naroda i jezika iliričkoga aliti rvackoga (1747) and is regarded as a predecessor to both him and Andrija Kačić Miošić.

== Sources ==
- Nikica Kolumbić (1996). "Toma Babić - Grabovčev i Kačićev preteča". Hvar City Theatre Days. 22 (1). HAZU and Književni krug Split. ISSN 1849-0255.
