= List of members of the Croatian Academy of Sciences and Arts =

National academy of Croatia

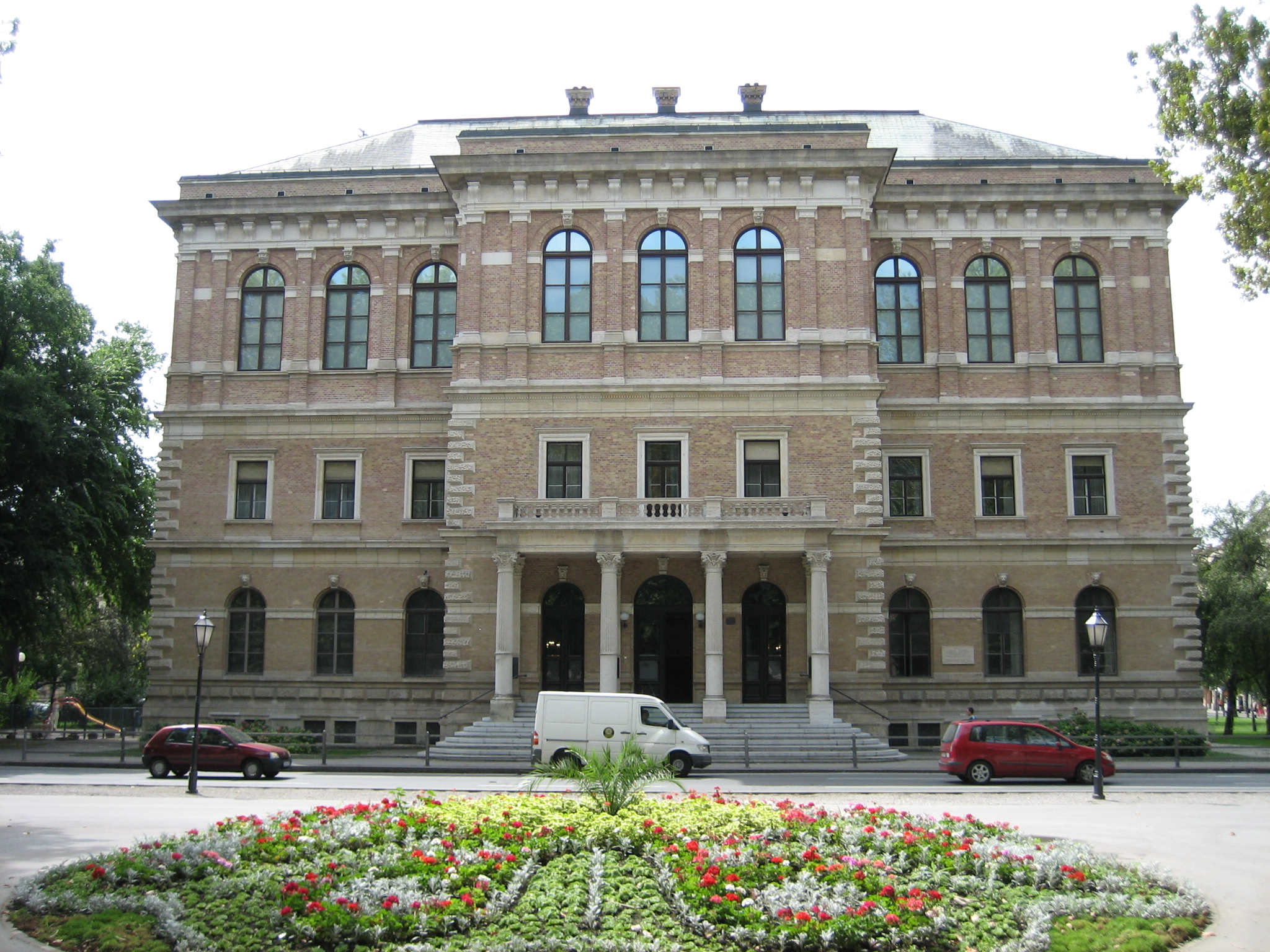
Croatian Academy of Sciences and Arts

The Croatian Academy of Sciences and Arts (founded in 1866 as Yugoslav Academy of Sciences and Arts) is the national academy of Croatia. The academy's membership consists of full, corresponding, honorary and associate members. Full members of the academy are elected from among scientists and artists who are Croatian citizens, and who have made outstanding achievements in their particular fields. As of 2018, the academy's statute limits the number of full members to 160.

The following is a list of full members of the academy, current and past.

== Past members ==
Name	Born	Died	Full member since	Department	Offices held in the academy	Notes	Refs
Mihovil Abramić	1884	1962	1947	Dept. of Social Sciences			
Josip Adamček	1933	1995	1991	Dept. of Social Sciences			
Jerko Alačević	1876	1963	1950	Dept. of Mathematical, Physical and Technical Sciences			
Nikša Allegretti	1920	1982	1973	Dept. of Medical Sciences			
Juraj Andrassy	1896	1977	1965	Dept. of Social Sciences			
Josip Andreis	1909	1982	1975	Dept. of Music and Musicology			
Kosta Angeli Radovani	1916	2002	1992	Dept. of Fine Arts			
Milan Anić	1906	1968	1968	Dept. of Natural Sciences			
Đuro Arnold	1853	1941	1899	Philosophical-Juridical Dept.			
Smiljko Ašperger	1921	2014	1991	Dept. of Mathematical, Physical and Chemical Sciences			
Antun Augustinčić	1900	1979	1947	Dept. of Fine Arts and Music			
Hrvoje Babić	1929	2015	1997	Dept. of Technical Sciences			
Ivo Babić	1900	1977	1950	Dept. of Natural and Medical Sciences			
Krunoslav Babić	1875	1953	1940	Mathematical-Natural Dept.			
Ljubo Babić	1890	1974	1934	Dept. of Arts			
Josip Badalić	1888	1985	1951	Dept. of Philological Sciences		Membership ended in 1954.	
Vladimir Bakarić	1912	1983	1950	Dept. of Social Sciences			
Vojin Bakić	1915	1992	1988	Dept. of Fine Arts			
Krešimir Balenović	1914	2003	1975	Dept. of Mathematical, Physical and Chemical Sciences			
Mate Balota	1898	1963	1947	Dept. of Social Sciences	Secretary-General (1958–1961)		
Antun Barac	1894	1955	1947	Dept. of Philological Sciences			
Krešimir Baranović	1894	1975	1954	Dept. of Music and Musicology			
Slaven Barišić	1942	2015	1991	Dept. of Mathematical, Physical and Chemical Sciences			
Nikola Batušić	1938	2010	1994	Dept. of Literature			
Antun Bauer	1856	1937	1899	Philosophical-Juridical Dept.			
Vladimir Bayer	1912	1990	1977	Dept. of Social Sciences			
Albert Bazala	1877	1947	1922	Dept. of Social Sciences	Chairman (1933–1941)		
Vladimir Becić	1886	1954	1934	Dept. of Arts			
Vojislav Bego	1923	1999	1991	Dept. of Technical Sciences			
Milan Begović	1876	1948	?				
Miroslav Begović	1925	2004	1990	Dept. of Fine Arts	Vice-chairman (1998–2003)		
Ivan Berčić	1824	1870	1867	Historical-Philological Dept.		One of the academy's 16 inaugural members.	
Tihomil Beritić	1919	1999	1986	Dept. of Medical Sciences			
Jerko Bezić	1929	2010	1991	Dept. of Music and Musicology			
Dušan Bilandžić	1924	2015	1991	Dept. of Social Sciences			
Stanko Bilinski	1909	1998	1986	Dept. of Mathematical, Physical and Chemical Sciences			
Bruno Bjelinski	1909	1992	1988				
Danilo Blanuša	1903	1987	1958				
Janez Bleiweis	1808	1881	1866	Mathematical-Natural Dept.		One of the academy's 16 inaugural members.	
Ljubo Boban	1933	1994	1986				
Vaso Bogdanov	1902	1967	1955				
Rafo Bogišić	1925	2010	1991	Dept. of Literature			
Valtazar Bogišić	1834	1908	1867	Philosophical-Juridical Dept.			
Mirko Bogović	1816	1893	1866	Philosophical-Juridical Dept.		One of the academy's 16 inaugural members.	
Dragutin Boranić	1870	1955	1924	Historical-Philological Dept.			
Tomo Bosanac	1918	2003	1991	Dept. of Technical Sciences			
Maja Bošković-Stulli	1922	2012	2000	Dept. of Literature			
Branko Bošnjak	1923	1996	?				
Josip Božičević	1929	2021	1997	Dept. of Technical Sciences			
Mirko Božić	1919	1995	1975				
Vladislav Brajković	1905	1989	1968				
Dalibor Brozović	1927	2009	1986	Dept. of Philological Sciences			
Spiridon Brusina	1845	1908	1874	Mathematical-Natural Dept.			
Mile Budak	1889	1945	1941				
Pero Budmani	1835	1914	1883	Historical-Philological Dept.			
Zoran Bujas	1910	2004	1968	Dept. of Natural Sciences	Vice-chairman (1989–1991)	The first (and, as of 2010, the only) psychologist to become a full member.	
Željko Bujas	1928	1999	1991	Dept. of Philological Sciences			
Frane Bulić	1846	1934	1925				
Viktor Car Emin	1870	1963	1951				
Dobriša Cesarić	1902	1980	1951	Dept. of Literature			
Ivan Cifrić	1946	2018	2010	Dept. of Social Sciences			
Menci Clement Crnčić	1865	1930	1919				
Slavko Cvetnić	1929	2016	1991	Dept. of Medical Sciences	Secretary-General (2004–2010)		
Dušan Čalić	1918	1993	1965				
Ljubomir Čečuk	1920	2002	1990	Dept. of Medical Sciences			
Bela Čikoš Sesija	1864	1931	1919				
Petar Krešimir Čolić	1938	2000	1992	Dept. of Technical Sciences			
Ferdo Čulinović	1897	1971	1962				
Ivo Čupar	1901	1981	?				
Đuro Daničić	1825	1882	1867	Historical-Philological Dept.	Secretary-General (1867–1873)	One of the academy's 16 inaugural members and its first Secretary-General.	
Mirko Deanović	1890	1984	1960				
Marijan Detoni	1905	1981	1963	Dept. of Fine Arts	Vice-chairman (1972–1975)		
Vladimir Devidé	1925	2010	1990	Dept. of Mathematical, Physical and Chemical Sciences			
Zvonimir Devidé	1921	2011	1991	Dept. of Natural Sciences			
Dragutin Domjanić	1875	1933	1919				
Adolf Dragičević	1924	2010	1991	Dept. of Social Sciences			
Franjo Dugan	1874	1948	1921	Dept. of Arts		Membership stripped in 1945.	
Vladoje Dukat	1861	1944	1938	Historical-Philological Dept.			
Vinko Dvořák	1848	1922	1887	Mathematical-Natural Dept.			
Dušan Džamonja	1928	2009	2004	Dept. of Fine Arts			
Nedjeljko Fabrio	1937	2018	1997	Dept. of Literature			
Jakša Fiamengo	1946	2018	2014	Dept. of Literature			
Rudolf Filipović	1916	2000	1979	Dept. of Philological Sciences			
Božidar Finka	1925	1999	1988	Dept. of Philological Sciences			
Franjo Fancev	1882	1943	1940	Historical-Philological Dept.			
Goran Filipi	1954	2021	2012	Dept. of Philological Sciences			
Aleksandar Flaker	1924	2010	1991	Dept. of Literature			
Dragutin Fleš	1921	2005	1991	Dept. of Technical Sciences			
Sergej Forenbacher	1921	2010	1975	Dept. of Medical Sciences			
Ivo Frangeš	1920	2003	1968	Dept. of Literature			
Marin Franičević	1911	1990	1968		Vice-chairman (1985–1989)		
Branko Fučić	1920	1999	1991				
Drago Galić	1907	1992	1962				
Branko Gavella	1885	1962	1961				
Lavoslav Geitler	1847	1885	1874	Historical-Philological Dept.			
Branimir Glavičić	1926	2010	1991				
Josip Goldberg	1885	1960	1951	Dept. of Mathematical, Physical and Technical Sciences			
Vladimir Goldner	1933	2017	2002	Dept. of Medical Sciences			
Aleksandar Goldštajn	1912	2010	1991	Dept. of Social Sciences			
Dragutin Gorjanović-Kramberger	1856	1936	1909				
Veljko Gortan	1907	1985	1965	Dept. of Philological Sciences	Vice-chairman (1972–1978)		
Jakov Gotovac	1895	1982	1977	Dept. of Music and Musicology			
Mihovil Gračanin	1901	1981	1941			Membership ended in 1951.	
Nenad Grčević	1922	2004	1983	Dept. of Medical Sciences			
Drago Grdenić	1919	2018	1973	Dept. of Mathematical, Physical and Chemical Sciences	Secretary-General (1973–1975)		
Petar Guberina	1913	2005	1963				
Stjepan Gunjača	1909	1981	1962				
Branimir Gušić	1901	1975	1947		Secretary-General (1947–1950)		
Josip Hamm	1905	1986	1977				
Jaromír Hanel	1847	1910	1874	Philosophical-Juridical Dept.			
Ljudmil Hauptmann	1884	1968	1940	Historical-Philological Dept.			
Krsto Hegedušić	1901	1975	1948				
Milan Herak	1917	2015	1973	Dept. of Natural Sciences	Vice-chairman (1975–1978)		
Stanko Hondl	1873	1971	1925		Vice-chairman (1934–1940)		
Stanko Horvat	1930	2006	1998	Dept. of Music and Musicology			
Mate Hraste	1897	1970	1961				
Vladimir Ibler	1913	2015	1991	Dept. of Social Sciences			
Drago Ikić	1917	2014	1977	Dept. of Medical Sciences			
Ljubo Ivančić	1925	2003	1991	Dept. of Fine Arts			
Ćiril Iveković	1864	1933	1922	Dept. of Fine Arts			
Stjepan Ivšić	1884	1962	1925	Historical-Philological Dept.		Membership stripped in 1945.	
Vatroslav Jagić	1838	1923	1866	Historical-Philological Dept.	Secretary-General (1870–1872)	One of the academy's 16 inaugural members.	
Gustav Janeček	1848	1929	1887	Mathematical-Natural Dept.	Chairman (1921–1924)		
Zlatko Janković	1916	1987	1980				
Živko Jeličić	1920	1995	1983				
Ljudevit Jonke	1907	1979	1963				
Ivan Jurković	1917	2014	1969	Dept. of Natural Sciences			
Janko Jurković	1827	1889	1867	Philosophical-Juridical Dept.			
Vjekoslav Kaleb	1905	1996	1961				
Nikola Kallay	1942	2015	2008	Dept. of Mathematical, Physical and Chemical Sciences			
Boris Kamenar	1929	2012	1991	Dept. of Mathematical, Physical and Chemical Sciences			
Ljubo Karaman	1886	1971	1965				
Miroslav Karšulin	1904	1984	1952	Dept. of Mathematical, Physical and Technical Sciences	Secretary-General (1961–1972)		
Ivan Kasumović	1872	1945	1915	Historical-Philological Dept.			
Jure Kaštelan	1919	1990	1979				
Radoslav Katičić	1930	2019	1986	Dept. of Philological Sciences			
Mladen Kauzlarić	1896	1971	1962				
Nives Kavurić-Kurtović	1938	2016	1997	Dept. of Fine Arts		The first woman painter to become a full member.	
Branko Kesić	1910	1988	1968		Vice-chairman (1978–1985)		
Mijo Kišpatić	1851	1926	1887	Mathematical-Natural Dept.			
Vjekoslav Klaić	1849	1928	1896	Historical-Philological Dept.			
Dušan Klepac	1917	2006	1991	Dept. of Natural Sciences			
Anđelko Klobučar	1931	2016	1992	Dept. of Music and Musicology			
Vanda Kochansky-Devidé	1915	1990	1973			The first woman to become a full member.	
Franjo Kogoj	1894	1983	1947		Vice-chairman (1958–1972)		
Nikica Kolumbić	1930	2009	2002	Dept. of Philological Sciences			
Krista Kostial-Šimonović	1923	2018	1991	Dept. of Natural Sciences			
Marko Kostrenčić	1884	1976	1921		Secretary-General (1951–1957); Vice-chairman (1957–1958)		
Edo Kovačević	1906	1993	1986				
Ivan Kožarić	1921	2020	1997	Dept. of Fine Arts			
Velimir Kranjec	1930	2002	1991	Dept. of Natural Sciences			
Zoran Kravar	1948	2013	2012	Dept. of Literature			
Ivo Krbek	1890	1966	1947				
Hamdija Kreševljaković	1888	1959	1941				
Miroslav Krleža	1893	1981	1947	Dept. of Literature	Vice-chairman (1947–1957); Secretary-General (1950–1951)		
Jelena Krmpotić-Nemanić	1921	2008	1991	Dept. of Medical Sciences			
Frano Kršinić	1897	1982	1948				
Slavko Krvavica	1920	2003	1991	Dept. of Medical Sciences			
Ferdinand Kulmer	1925	1998	1991	Dept. of Fine Arts			
Igor Kuljerić	1938	2006	2004	Dept. of Music and Musicology			
Fran Kurelac	1811	1874	1867	Historical-Philological Dept.			
Branko Kurelec	1935	1999	1992	Dept. of Natural Sciences			
Ivan Kušan	1933	2012	2002	Dept. of Literature			
Branimir Livadić	1871	1949	1940	Dept. of Arts			
Šime Ljubić	1822	1896	1866	Historical-Philological Dept.		One of the academy's 16 inaugural members.	
Josip Lončar	1891	1973	1947				
Blaž Lorković	1839	1892	1890	Philosophical-Juridical Dept.			
Zdravko Lorković	1900	1998	1965	Dept. of Natural Sciences			
Vladimir Luetić	1927	2000	1992	Dept. of Medical Sciences			
Milan Maceljski	1925	2007	1992	Dept. of Natural Sciences			
Ivo Maček	1914	2002	1983	Dept. of Music and Musicology			
Boris Magaš	1930	2013	1991	Dept. of Fine Arts			
Franjo Maixner	1841	1903	1882	Historical-Philological Dept.			
Vladimir Majer	1922	2012	1986	Dept. of Natural Sciences			
Nikola Majnarić	1885	1966	1952				
Mirko Malez	1924	1990	1979				
Gavro Manojlović	1856	1939	1908		Chairman (1924–1933)		
Sibe Mardešić	1927	2016	1988	Dept. of Mathematical, Physical and Chemical Sciences			
Tomislav Maretić	1854	1938	1890	Historical-Philological Dept.	Chairman (1915–1918)		
Lujo Margetić	1920	2010	1991	Dept. of Social Sciences			
Ranko Marinković	1913	2001	1983	Dept. of Literature			
Franjo Marković	1845	1914	1876	Philosophical-Juridical Dept.		The first philosopher to become a full member.	
Željko Marković	1889	1974	1931				
Slavko Matić	1938	2021	2004	Dept. of Natural Sciences			
Tomo Matić	1874	1968	1940		Vice-chairman (1940–1941); Chairman (1942–1946)	Membership stripped in 1946.	
Marijan Matković	1915	1985	?	Dept. of Literature			
Petar Matković	1830	1898	1867	Historical-Philological Dept.			
Vladimir Matković	1915	2005	1991	Dept. of Technical Sciences			
Ivan Maurović	1873	1952	1930				
Vladimir Mažuranić	1859	1928	1918	Mathematical-Natural Dept.	Chairman (1918–1921)		
Antica Menac	1922	2020	1988	Dept. of Philological Sciences			
Matija Mesić	1826	1878	1867	Historical-Philological Dept.			
Milan Meštrov	1929	2010	1991	Dept. of Natural Sciences			
Ivan Meštrović	1883	1962	1934	Dept. of Arts			
Sead Midžić	1912	1999	1991	Dept. of Medical Sciences			
Slavko Mihalić	1928	2007	1991	Dept. of Literature			
Milan Moguš	1927	2017	1986	Dept. of Philological Sciences	Secretary-General (1991–1997); Vice-chairman (1998–2003); Chairman (2004–2010)		
Andre Mohorovičić	1913	2002	1962	Dept. of Fine Arts	Secretary-General (1975–1978); Vice-chairman (1978–1989, 1989–1991)		
Andrija Mohorovičić	1857	1936	1898	Mathematical-Natural Dept.			
Pavao Muhić	1812	1897	1866	Philosophical-Juridical Dept.	Chairman (1887–1890)	One of the academy's 16 inaugural members.	
Jurica Murai	1927	1999	1997	Dept. of Music and Musicology			
Edo Murtić	1921	2005	1997	Dept. of Fine Arts			
August Musić	1856	1938	1896	Historical-Philological Dept.			
Stjepan Musulin	1885	1969	1953				
Vladimir Nazor	1876	1949	1940	Dept. of Arts			
Natko Nodilo	1834	1912	1883	Historical-Philological Dept.			
Grga Novak	1888	1978	1939		Secretary-General (1957–1958); Chairman (1958–1978)		
Slobodan Novak	1924	2016	1991	Dept. of Literature			
Albert Ogrizek	1891	1970	1954	Dept. of Natural Sciences			
Ivo Padovan	1922	2010	1983	Dept. of Medical Sciences	Vice-chairman (1991–1997); Chairman (1997–2003)		
Mladen Paić	1905	1997	1961	Dept. of Mathematical, Physical and Technical Sciences			
Boris Papandopulo	1906	1991	1965	Dept. of Music and Musicology			
Armin Pavić	1844	1914	1874	Historical-Philological Dept.			
Vlatko Pavletić	1930	2007	1991	Dept. of Literature	Vice-chairman (1991–1997)		
Matko Peić	1923	1999	1991	Dept. of Literature			
Ivo Perišin	1925	2008	1990	Dept. of Social Sciences			
Božidar Petranović	1809	1874	1867	Philosophical-Juridical Dept.			
Ivo Petricioli	1925	2009	1992	Dept. of Fine Arts			
Nikica Petrak	1939	2016	2004	Dept. of Literature			
Ivo Petrinović	1929	2003	1997	Dept. of Social Sciences			
Ivo Pevalek	1893	1967	1960	Dept. of Natural Sciences			
Đuro Pilar	1846	1893	1875	Mathematical-Natural Dept.			
Martin Pilar	1861	1942	1919		Vice-chairman (1924–1934)		
Vladimir Popović	1910	1995	1982				
Hrvoje Požar	1916	1991	1975		Secretary-General (1978–1990)		
Velimir Pravdić	1931	2011	1997	Dept. of Natural Sciences			
Zlatko Prica	1916	2003	1988	Dept. of Fine Arts			
Kruno Prijatelj	1922	1998	1968	Dept. of Fine Arts			
Ivan Prpić	1927	2019	1991	Dept. of Medical Sciences			
Eugen Pusić	1916	2010	1983	Dept. of Social Sciences			
Franjo Rački	1828	1894	1866	Historical-Philological Dept.	Chairman (1866–1886)	One of the academy's 16 inaugural members and its first chairman.	
Mirko Rački	1879	1982	1921				
Vanja Radauš	1906	1975	1947				
Tomislav Raukar	1933	2020	1997	Dept. of Social Sciences			
Milan Rešetar	1860	1942	1924	Historical-Philological Dept.			
Svetozar Rittig	1873	1961	1947				
Riko Rosman	1927	2008	1991	Dept. of Mathematical, Physical and Chemical Sciences			
Ivo Ruszkowski	1921	1998	1991	Dept. of Medical Sciences			
Marko Ruždjak	1946	2012	2008	Dept. of Music and Musicology			
Marijan Salopek	1883	1967	1935	Dept. of Natural Sciences			
Marko Samardžija	1947	2019	2018	Dept. of Philological Sciences			
Josip Schlosser	1808	1882	1866	Mathematical-Natural Dept.		One of the academy's 16 inaugural members.	
Artur Schneider	1879	1946	1930	Dept. of Arts			
Josip Seissel	1904	1987	1962				
Hodimir Sirotković	1918	2009	1991				
Jakov Sirotković	1922	2002	1975	Dept. of Social Sciences	Chairman (1978–1991)		
Petar Skok	1881	1956	1947	Dept. of Philological Sciences			
Ivan Slamnig	1930	2001	1992	Dept. of Literature			
Tadija Smičiklas	1843	1914	1883	Historical-Philological Dept.	Chairman (1900–1914)		
Šime Spaventi	1925	2012	1991	Dept. of Medical Sciences			
Ante Stamać	1939	2016	2002	Dept. of Literature			
Svetislav Stančić	1895	1970	1954	Dept. of Music and Musicology			
Vladimir Stipetić	1928	2017	1973	Dept. of Social Sciences			
Petar Strčić	1936	2019	2000	Dept. of Social Sciences			
Jovan Subotić	1817	1886	1866	Philosophical-Juridical Dept.		One of the academy's 16 inaugural members.	
Dionis Emerik Sunko	1922	2010	1997	Dept. of Mathematical, Physical and Chemical Sciences			
Ivan Supek	1915	2007	1961	Dept. of Mathematical, Physical and Chemical Sciences	Chairman (1991–1997)		
Vilim Svečnjak	1906	1993	1988				
Franjo Šanjek	1939	2019	1997	Dept. of Social Sciences			
Marko Šarić	1924	2019	1991	Dept. of Medical Sciences			
Stjepan Šćavničar	1927	2011	1990	Dept. of Natural Sciences			
Dragovan Šepić	1907	1997	1986				
Petar Šegedin	1909	1998	1963	Dept. of Literature			
Ante Šercer	1896	1968	1937			Membership stripped in 1945.	
Miroslav Šicel	1926	2011	1996	Dept. of Literature			
Petar Šimunović	1933	2014	1991	Dept. of Philological Sciences			
Božidar Širola	1889	1956	1928	Dept. of Arts			
Ferdo Šišić	1869	1940	1911				
Vinko Škarić	1923	2006	1991	Dept. of Mathematical, Physical and Chemical Sciences			
Zdenko Škrabalo	1929	2014	1992	Dept. of Medical Sciences			
Nikola Škreb	1920	1993	1979		Secretary-General (1972–1973)		
Stjepan Škreb	1879	1952	1937		Vice-chairman (1942–1945)		
Milivoj Šrepel	1862	1905	1893	Historical-Philological Dept.			
Andrija Štampar	1888	1958	1947		Chairman (1947–1958)		
Mirko Šuhaj	1822	1889	1867	Philosophical-Juridical Dept.		One of the academy's 16 inaugural members.	
Bogoslav Šulek	1816	1895	1866	Mathematical-Natural Dept.		One of the academy's 16 inaugural members.	
Miroslav Šutej	1936	2005	1997	Dept. of Fine Arts			
Anton Švajger	1935	2003	2000	Dept. of Natural Sciences			
Franjo Švelec	1916	2001	1991	Dept. of Philological Sciences			
Dubravko Tadić	1934	2003	1991	Dept. of Mathematical, Physical and Chemical Sciences			
Dragutin Tadijanović	1905	2007	1965	Dept. of Literature			
Miroslav Tajder	1909	1983	1958				
Marino Tartaglia	1894	1984	1948				
Alois Tavčar	1895	1979	1947	Dept. of Natural Sciences			
Đuro Tiljak	1895	1965	1947				
Adolfo Veber Tkalčević	1825	1889	1866	Philosophical-Juridical Dept.		One of the academy's 16 inaugural members.	
Ivan Tkalčić	1840	1905	1883	Historical-Philological Dept.			
Eugen Topolnik	1912	2014	1979	Dept. of Medical Sciences			
Josip Torbar	1824	1900	1866	Mathematical-Natural Dept.	Secretary-General (1872–1874); Chairman (1890–1900)	One of the academy's 16 inaugural members.	
Josip Torbarina	1902	1986	1956	Dept. of Philological Sciences			
Željko Trgovčević	1939	2000	1992	Dept. of Natural Sciences			
Franjo Tuđman	1922	1999	1992	Dept. of Social Sciences			
Aleksandar Ugrenović	1883	1958	1948	Dept. of Natural Sciences			
Josip Vaništa	1924	2018	1994	Dept. of Fine Arts			
Teodor Varićak	1907	1977	1958	Dept. of Natural Sciences			
Vladimir Varićak	1865	1942	1904	Mathematical-Natural Dept.			
Nenad Vekarić	1955	2018	2012	Dept. of Social Sciences			
Mirko Vidaković	1924	2002	1981	Dept. of Natural Sciences			
Vojmir Vinja	1921	2007	1991	Dept. of Philological Sciences			
Konstantin Vojnović	1832	1903	1900	Philosophical-Juridical Dept.			
Josip Vončina	1932	2010	1991	Dept. of Philological Sciences			
Vale Vouk	1886	1962	1924	Dept. of Natural Sciences			
Predrag Vranicki	1922	2002	1979	Dept. of Social Sciences			
Fran Vrbanić	1847	1909	1886	Philosophical-Juridical Dept.			
Živko Vukasović	1829	1874	1866	Mathematical-Natural Dept.		One of the academy's 16 inaugural members.	
Ljudevit Farkaš Vukotinović	1813	1893	1867	Mathematical-Natural Dept.		One of the academy's 16 inaugural members.	
Ante Vulin	1932	2012	1991	Dept. of Fine Arts			
Ivana Weygand Đurašević	1952	2014	2012	Dept. of Natural Sciences			
Teodor Wikerhauser	1922	2018	1991	Dept. of Medical Sciences			
Karlo Zahradnik	1846	1882	1879	Mathematical-Natural Dept.			
Stjepan Zimmermann	1884	1963	1921			Membership ended in 1945.	
Milovan Zoričić	1850	1912	1893	Philosophical-Juridical Dept.			
Vinko Žganec	1890	1976	1966				
Josip Županov	1923	2004	1991	Dept. of Social Sciences			
Lovro Županović	1925	2004	1991	Dept. of Music and Musicology			

== Current members ==
Name	Born	Full member since	Department	Offices held in the academy	Notes	Refs
Igor Anić	1967	2012	Dept. of Natural Sciences			
Ivan Aralica	1930	1992	Dept. of Literature			
Stjepan Babić	1925	1991	Dept. of Philological Sciences			
Arsen Bačić	1951	2018	Dept. of Social Sciences			
Zvonimir Baletić	1936	2004	Dept. of Social Sciences			
Jakša Barbić	1936	2004	Dept. of Social Sciences	Vice-chairman (2011–2018)		
Ferdo Bašić	1945	2014	Dept. of Natural Sciences			
Nikola Bašić	1946	2016	Dept. of Fine Arts			
Vladimir Bermanec	1955	2012	Dept. of Natural Sciences			
Zlatko Bourek	1929	2010	Dept. of Fine Arts			
Josip Bratulić	1939	2000	Dept. of Philological Sciences			
Boris Bućan	1947	2006	Dept. of Fine Arts			
Leo Budin	1937	2004	Dept. of Technical Sciences			
Nenad Cambi	1937	2002	Dept. of Social Sciences			
Željko Cvetnić	1963	2016	Dept. of Medical Sciences			
Ivo Čikeš	1938	2000	Dept. of Medical Sciences			
Žarko Dadić	1930	1992	Dept. of Mathematical, Physical and Chemical Sciences			
Stjepan Damjanović	1946	2004	Dept. of Philological Sciences			
Dragan Dekaris	1936	1991	Dept. of Medical Sciences			
Vida Demarin	1944	2010	Dept. of Medical Sciences			
Branko Despot	1942	2010	Dept. of Social Sciences			
Pavle Dešpalj	1934	1992	Dept. of Music and Musicology	Vice-chairman (2004–2010)		
Gordan Družić	1955	2012	Dept. of Social Sciences			
Andrej Dujella	1966	2012	Dept. of Mathematical, Physical and Chemical Sciences			
Goran Durn	1962	2016	Dept. of Natural Sciences			
Dunja Fališevac	1946	2006	Dept. of Philological Sciences			
Dragutin Feletar	1941	2016	Dept. of Social Sciences			
Igor Fisković	1944	2004	Dept. of Fine Arts			
Stjepan Gamulin	1934	2002	Dept. of Natural Sciences			
Nikša Gligo	1946	2006	Dept. of Music and Musicology			
Ivan Gušić	1938	1992	Dept. of Natural Sciences			
Eduard Hercigonja	1929	1991	Dept. of Philological Sciences			
Vera Horvat-Pintarić	1926	2000	Dept. of Fine Arts			
Marin Hraste	1938	2006	Dept. of Technical Sciences			
Ksenofont Ilakovac	1928	1991	Dept. of Mathematical, Physical and Chemical Sciences			
Milko Jakšić	1958	2016	Dept. of Mathematical, Physical and Chemical Sciences			
Stjepan Jecić	1934	2000	Dept. of Technical Sciences			
Sibila Jelaska	1938	1997	Dept. of Technical Sciences			
Antun Dubravko Jelčić	1930	1992	Dept. of Literature			
Vjekoslav Jerolimov	1945	2014	Dept. of Medical Sciences		The first stomatologist to become a full member.	
Mislav Ježić	1952	2000	Dept. of Philological Sciences			
Mladen Juračić	1953	2012	Dept. of Natural Sciences			
Zoran Juranić	1947	2014	Dept. of Music and Musicology			
Andrija Kaštelan	1934	1991	Dept. of Natural Sciences	Secretary-General (1998–2003)		
Zlatko Keser	1942	2004	Dept. of Fine Arts			
Branko Kincl	1938	2006	Dept. of Fine Arts			
Leo Klasinc	1937	2004	Dept. of Mathematical, Physical and Chemical Sciences			
Koraljka Kos	1934	1991	Dept. of Music and Musicology			
Ivica Kostović	1943	2006	Dept. of Medical Sciences			
August Kovačec	1938	1997	Dept. of Philological Sciences			
Dinko Kovačić	1938	2006	Dept. of Fine Arts			
Davor Krapac	1947	2012	Dept. of Social Sciences			
Frano Kršinić	1947	2000	Dept. of Natural Sciences			
Željko Kućan	1934	1991	Dept. of Natural Sciences			
Elso Kuljanić	1936	1997	Dept. of Technical Sciences			
Zvonko Kusić	1946	2000	Dept. of Medical Sciences	Chairman (2011–2018)		
Božidar Liščić	1929	1997	Dept. of Technical Sciences			
Ignac Lovrek	1947	2016	Dept. of Technical Sciences			
Nikola Ljubešić	1940	2016	Dept. of Natural Sciences			
Mladen Machiedo	1938	2014	Dept. of Literature			
Josip Madić	1952	2012	Dept. of Medical Sciences			
Vladimir Marković	1939	2000	Dept. of Fine Arts			
Tonko Maroević	1941	2002	Dept. of Literature			
Ranko Matasović	1968	2012	Dept. of Philological Sciences			
Davor Miličić	1962	2012	Dept. of Medical Sciences	Vice-chairman (2019–present)		
Zvonimir Mrkonjić	1938	2006	Dept. of Literature			
Svetozar Musić	1946	2016	Dept. of Mathematical, Physical and Chemical Sciences			
Andrija Mutnjaković	1929	2004	Dept. of Fine Arts			
Anica Nazor	1935	1992	Dept. of Philological Sciences			
Velimir Neidhardt	1943	1991	Dept. of Fine Arts	Vice-chairman (2011–2018); Chairman (2019–present)		
Krešimir Nemec	1953	2008	Dept. of Literature			
Darko Novaković	1953	2008	Dept. of Philological Sciences			
Mladen Obad Šćitaroci	1955	2014	Dept. of Fine Arts			
Dubravka Oraić Tolić	1943	2014	Dept. of Literature			
Mirko Orlić	1955	2016	Dept. of Natural Sciences			
Vladimir Paar	1942	1992	Dept. of Mathematical, Physical and Chemical Sciences			
Luko Paljetak	1943	1997	Dept. of Literature			
Frano Parać	1948	2008	Dept. of Music and Musicology	Vice-chairman (2019–present)		
Pavao Pavličić	1946	1997	Dept. of Literature			
Josip Pečarić	1948	2000	Dept. of Mathematical, Physical and Chemical Sciences			
Marko Pećina	1940	2004	Dept. of Medical Sciences			
Ivanka Petrović	1939	2010	Dept. of Philological Sciences			
Goran Pichler	1946	2010	Dept. of Mathematical, Physical and Chemical Sciences			
Vlasta Piližota	1952	2006	Dept. of Technical Sciences			
Stanko Popović	1938	2004	Dept. of Mathematical, Physical and Chemical Sciences			
Zvonko Posavec	1936	2006	Dept. of Social Sciences			
Ruben Radica	1931	2000	Dept. of Music and Musicology			
Željko Reiner	1953	2006	Dept. of Medical Sciences			
Pavao Rudan	1942	2006	Dept. of Natural Sciences	Secretary-General (2011–2018)		
Davorin Rudolf	1934	1992	Dept. of Social Sciences			
Daniel Rukavina	1937	2000	Dept. of Medical Sciences			
Miroslav Samaržija	1958	2016	Dept. of Medical Sciences			
Đuro Seder	1927	2000	Dept. of Fine Arts			
Boris Senker	1947	2012	Dept. of Literature			
Ivo Senjanović	1940	2002	Dept. of Technical Sciences			
Vlatko Silobrčić	1935	1991	Dept. of Natural Sciences			
Dragutin Skoko	1930	1991	Dept. of Natural Sciences			
Branko Sokač	1933	1992	Dept. of Natural Sciences			
Milivoj Solar	1936	2008	Dept. of Literature			
Nikša Stančić	1938	2004	Dept. of Social Sciences			
Ivan Supičić	1928	1983	Dept. of Music and Musicology			
Ivo Šlaus	1931	1991	Dept. of Mathematical, Physical and Chemical Sciences			
Vitomir Šunjić	1939	2012	Dept. of Mathematical, Physical and Chemical Sciences			
Marko Tadić	1953	2000	Dept. of Mathematical, Physical and Chemical Sciences			
Mirko Tomasović	1938	2000	Dept. of Literature			
Franjo Tomić	1936	2010	Dept. of Natural Sciences			
Radoslav Tomić	1957	2010	Dept. of Fine Arts			
Goran Tribuson	1948	2008	Dept. of Literature			
Nenad Trinajstić	1936	1992	Dept. of Mathematical, Physical and Chemical Sciences			
Stanislav Tuksar	1945	2012	Dept. of Music and Musicology			
Božo Udovičić	1933	1997	Dept. of Technical Sciences			
Marija Ujević-Galetović	1933	1998	Dept. of Fine Arts			
Josip Užarević	1953	2014	Dept. of Literature			
Igor Vlahović	1965	2016	Dept. of Natural Sciences			
Dario Vretenar	1958	2012	Dept. of Mathematical, Physical and Chemical Sciences	Secretary-General (2019–present)		
Zlatan Vrkljan	1955	2014	Dept. of Literature			
Slobodan Vukičević	1951	2014	Dept. of Medical Sciences			
Šime Vulas	1932	1991	Dept. of Fine Arts			
Alica Wertheimer-Baletić	1937	1992	Dept. of Social Sciences	Vice-chairwoman (2004–2010)		
Mirko Zelić	1936	2000	Dept. of Technical Sciences			
Milena Žic-Fuchs	1954	2010	Dept. of Philological Sciences			
Mladen Žinić	1947	2014	Dept. of Mathematical, Physical and Chemical Sciences			
Viktor Žmegač	1929	2012	Dept. of Literature			

== Sources ==
- Šanjek, Franjo, ed. (June 2011). 150 godina Hrvatske akademije znanosti i umjetnosti 1861–2011 (PDF) (in Croatian). Zagreb: Croatian Academy of Sciences and Arts. ISBN 978-953-154-961-5.
