= Musulin =

Musulin is a Serbian and Croatian surname. At least 129 individuals with the surname died at the Jasenovac concentration camp.

It may refer to:

- Branka Musulin (1917–1975), Croatian-born German classical pianist
- George Musulin (1914–1987), Serbian-American officer of the Office of Strategic Services and naval intelligence services, and from 1950 onward a CIA agent
- Nikola Musulin, Serbian poet
- Stjepan Musulin (1885–1969), Croatian linguist
- Toni Musulin (born 1970), former security driver, stole €11.6 million from Banque de France

It is also a historical form of the name of the village Musulini.

== Bibliography ==
- Klempay, Josip Šimun (1859-06-25). "Oglas". Carsko kraljevske službene narodne novine (in Serbo-Croatian). Vol. 25, no. 143. p. 384. ISSN 1333-5243.
