= Ugrenović =

Ugrenović is a Serbian and Croatian surname. It may refer to:

- Aleksandar Ugrenović, Yugoslav forestry professor
- Dragan Ugrenović, footballer
- Đorđe Ugrenović, a victim in the Goraždevac murders

== See also ==
- Ugrinović
- Dragomir Ugren
