= Stjepan Musulin =

Yugoslav linguist

Stjepan Musulin (1885 in Sremska Mitrovica, Kingdom of Croatia-Slavonia, Austria-Hungary – 1969) was a Yugoslav linguist, comparative Slavicist, philologist, lexicographer and translator.

== Life ==
Musulin translated from the Polish and Czech languages. He is recognized as one of the greatest contributors to the development of Czech studies in Yugoslavia.

He studied at Kraków, Prague and Zagreb.

He was the first lecturer on Czech language in the Philosophical Faculty at the University of Zagreb.

In 1950, he became a corresponding, and in 1953, a full member of the Yugoslav Academy of Sciences and Arts from Zagreb (today Croatian Academy of Sciences and Arts).

His daughter was the famous pianist Branka Musulin, who had studied with Svetislav Stančić in Zagreb and Alfred Cortot in Paris.

== Works ==
Stjepan Musulin was the editor of several Academy's editions, such as:

- Hrvatska književnost od Preporoda do stvaranja Jugoslavije, 1954., 1964.
- Rječnik hrvatskoga ili srpskoga jezika

He was the author of school textbooks, like:

- Češka gramatika : i uputa u češko trgovačko dopisivanje, 1924 (Czech grammar and intro to Czech trade correspondence)
- Gramatika hrvatskosrpskoga jezika za IV. razred srednjih škola, 1928 (Grammar of Croatoserbian for IV. grade of Middle schools)

As a translator, he's known by his translations of works of Polish authors (Bolesław Prus, Stefan Żeromski) and Czech authors (Thomas Masaryk).

== Trivia ==
While he worked in gymnasium, he was the classmaster to famous Croatian poet Dobriša Cesarić.

== See also ==
- Croatian literature
