= Vihor =

Vihor may refer to:

- FK Vihor, a football club from Budva, Montenegro
- Vihor River, a river in Poland and Ukraine
- Vihor, a neighbourhood of Borča in Belgrade, Serbia

== See also ==
- Ivan Vihor (born 1997), Croatian pianist and chess player
- Operation Vihor, a Croatian Army offensive of 1991
