= Milovan Zoričić (statistician) =

Croatian jurist and statistician

Milovan Zoričić (10 August 1850 – 30 December 1912) was a Croatian jurist and statistician.

Zoričić studied law in Zagreb and Graz. He was the first director of the Royal Statistical Bureau in Zagreb (Croatian: Kraljevski statistički ured u Zagrebu), established in 1875, which was the precursor of the modern-day Croatian Bureau of Statistics. He was also instrumental in starting the Croatian Statistical Yearbook (Croatian: Hrvatski statistički godišnjak), a major publication of the Bureau.

Zoričić was a full member of the Yugoslav Academy of Sciences and Arts since 1893.

== Sources ==
- "Zoričić, Milovan, st.". Croatian Encyclopedia (in Croatian).
- "140 godina hrvatske statistike" (PDF) (in Croatian). Croatian Bureau of Statistics. 2015.
