= Vladimir Krpan =

Croatian pianist and piano pedagogue (1938–2025)

Krpan in 1976

Vladimir Krpan (Croatian pronunciation: [ʋlǎdimiːr kr̂paːn]) (11 January 1938 – 1 March 2025) was a Croatian pianist and piano pedagogue.

== Life and career ==
Krpan was born in Sveti Ivan Zelina on 11 January 1938. He graduated from the Zagreb Academy of Music in the class of Svetislav Stancic and won a master's degree at the Santa Cecilia Music Academy in Rome with Carlo Zecchi. He also studied with Guido Agosti, Renzo Silvestri and Arturo Benedetti Michelangeli in Rome, Arezzo, Siena, Bergamo and Lugano.

He founded the piano department at the Music Academy in Skopje, North Macedonia in 1971. He taught at the Music Academy of the University in Zagreb where he raised a few generations of young pianists such as Pedja Muzijevic, Katarina Krpan, Srdjan Caldarovic, Lana Genc, Martina Filjak, Maksim Mrvica, Bruno Vlahek and many others. In his pedagogical work, he combines elements of Stancic's Zagreb Piano School and the heritage of the Italian school, especially Arturo Benedetti Michelangeli's. He was an active promoter of music by Croatian composers, which holds a special place in his repertoire. Krpan has collaborated with many conductors and has had appearances in all the major music centres in Croatia and Europe as well as in the US, Russia, Iran, India, North and South Korea, Turkey and Thailand.

He was an author of a TV series dedicated to Croatian piano music, editor of many Croatian composers' works, and author of specialized articles in national and international music magazines. He recorded numerous solo and chamber music works for radio and television as well as 20 LPs and 15 CDs for different labels.

As a chamber musician, he was active as a member of Trio Orlando and formed a piano duo with his daughter, Katarina Krpan. He was the founder of the Croatian section of the European Piano Teachers Association (EPTA) and its two international competitions in Osijek and Zagreb (EPTA - International Piano Competition Svetislav Stančić).

Krpan was a juror at international piano competitions who regularly held master classes in his country and abroad. He died on 1 March 2025, at the age of 87.
