= Nives Kavurić-Kurtović =

Croatian painter (1938–2016)

- Born: 18 January 1938; Zagreb
- Died: 30 October 2016 (aged 78); Zagreb
- Education: Academy of Fine Arts in Zagreb
- Known for: painting

Nives Kavurić-Kurtović (18 January 1938 – 30 October 2016) was a Croatian painter and a member of the Croatian Academy of Sciences and Arts. She is a recipient of the Order of Danica Hrvatska (1996).

In 1962, she graduated from the Academy of Fine Arts in Zagreb in the class of professor Frano Baća. From 1962 to 1967, she was an associate in the workshop of Krsto Hegedušić. She was a professional artist until 1983, when she became a professor at the Academy of Fine Arts in Zagreb. She was an assistant professor there from 1986, a full professor from 1990, and a professor emeritus of the University of Zagreb from 2007.

In 1997, she became a regular member of the Croatian Academy of Sciences and Arts. Her works are in many private and public collections in Croatia and abroad.

Her works are often surrealistic and phantasmagoric with restless handwriting and refined coloring. She often writes her own or other people's texts. It is served by the acquisition of informality and a new understanding of space. She was a member of Croatian society of visual artists (HDLU) and a regular member of the Croatian Academy of Sciences and Arts (HAZU).

She is the daughter of architect Zvonimir Kavurić, while her husband was law professor Šefko Kurtović.

== Awards ==
- 1967 Youth Biennale de Paris, main prize
- 1968 2° Internationalen Malerwochen, Graz, main prize
- 1973 annual reward “Josip Račić”
- 1982 8° international original drawing exhibition, Rijeka, Grand prix
- 1990 25° "Zagrebački salon", first prize for painting
- 1996 Order of Danica Hrvatska for special merits in art
- 2004 “Vladimir Nazor” prize for a life's work
