= X Gymnasium Ivan Supek =

Public high school in Zagreb, Croatia

- X. gimnazija Ivan Supek
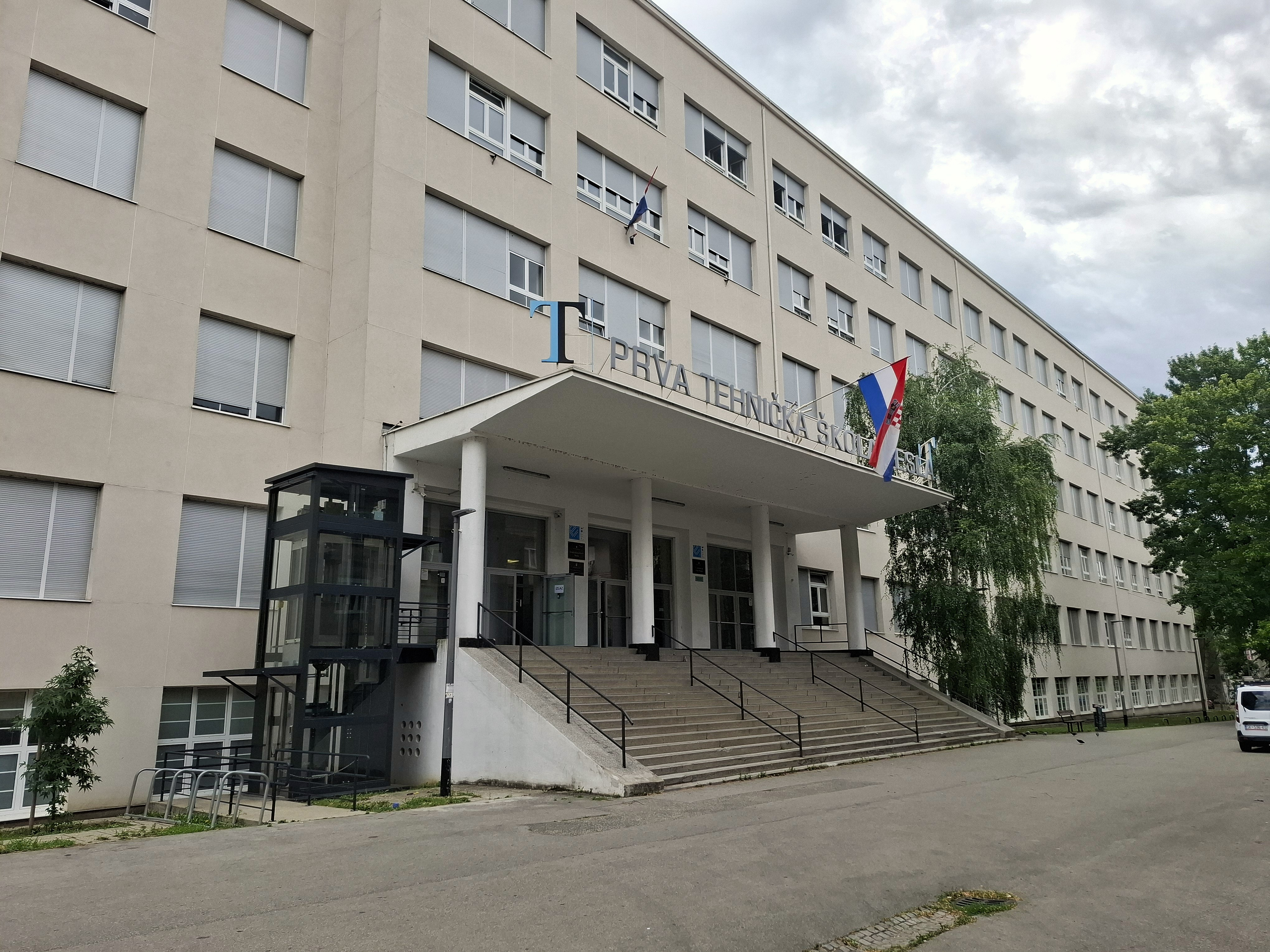
- Entrance of the 1st Technical School Tesla and the X Gymnasium Ivan Supek

Location
- Ulica Vjekoslava Klaića 7 HR-10000 Zagreb; Croatia
- 45.8091°N 15.9626°E

Information
- Former names: School of Crafts (1882); X Gymnasium (1961); Economics Education Center (1978); Nikola Tesla Education Center (1985); X Gymnasium (1991); X Gymnasium Ivan Supek (2007)
- School type: Public, Gymnasium
- Established: 1961; 65 years ago
- Secondary years taught: 9–12
  - Grade 9: 286 (2024–25)
- Language: Croatian
- Website: Official website (in Croatian)
- Last updated: June 17, 2025

Tenth Gymnasium Ivan Supek (Croatian: X. gimnazija, Deseta gimnazija) is a high school in Zagreb, Croatia.

It was named after Ivan Supek in 2007.

After the school year 2023/24, 255 graduates of this gymnasium enrolled at an institution of higher learning in Croatia, or 93.75% of students who took up the nationwide Matura exams. The most common destinations for these students were the University of Zagreb faculties of economics, science, electrical engineering and computing, mechanical engineering and naval architecture, and humanities and social sciences.
