= Inter-University Centre Dubrovnik =

The Inter-University Centre Dubrovnik (IUC) is an independent international institution for advanced studies. After an initial meeting in 1971, it was founded in 1972 on the initiative of Ivan Supek, then Rector of the University of Zagreb. The IUC is structured as a consortium of universities and other scientific institutions from all over the world.

== Mission ==
IUC was founded with the aim of encouraging and promoting international inter-university cooperation through the development of higher education and scientific research projects, primarily by organizing postgraduate and graduate study programs (graduate and doctoral programs), courses, conferences and research projects. In a typical year, about 70 international programs are organized and implemented with about 2000 participants.

Programs are generated by professors and scientists from mainly member institutions who, together with colleagues from other countries/other educational and scientific institutions, propose an academic program that is reviewed and accepted by the IUC Executive Board. IUC program organizers must be from at least two different countries, while lecturers and participants must be from at least three countries. If they meet the criteria for each program, students receive ECTS credits from their home universities for participating in some courses.

== History ==
The idea of establishing the IUC was initiated in 1970 at a meeting of the International Association of Universities in Montreal by Prof. Ivan Supek, at that time the Rector of the University of Zagreb. He proposed the establishment of an institution that would be independent, fully managed by the academic community, scientists and professors, representatives of their universities. Therefore, the IUC is structured as a consortium of universities and other scientific institutions that contribute to the development of its academic programs. The University of Zagreb, following the Founding Act from 1971, provides logistical support to the Interuniversity Centre in the form of providing space, operational support, and staff in the secretariat.

Dubrovnik was chosen as the seat of the IUC because of its rich history as an independent city-state, which thrived in a difficult position between East and West, between different religions and cultures. From the very beginning, the IUC responded to contemporary needs. During the Cold War, scientists saw the importance of creating new contacts and exchanging knowledge and ideas between divided countries. The desire was to strengthen the role of scientists in building bridges between nations and cultures, ideologies and political systems. In the former Yugoslavia, as a non-aligned country, these contacts could be made, and the IUC served as a bridge between East and West.

The IUC soon became a place of vibrant academic exchange. The number of members grew to more than 250 before the outbreak of the Homeland War in 1991 and the breakup of the former Yugoslavia. The events of the war did not stop the Center's activities. The attacks on Dubrovnik culminated on December 6, 1991, when the building where the IUC operates was hit by incendiary bombs and burned to the ground, along with all its inventory and a library of about 30,000 books. Only the outer walls and the staircase survived. Fortunately, most of the IUC archives were saved from the flames. At that time, many IUC friends mobilized support for the Center, but also for Dubrovnik, and the activity continued. In the first years, courses were held at other locations in Dubrovnik, and in the fall of 1993, the first part of the building renovation was completed, financed by the Government of the Republic of Croatia and the University of Zagreb, and the IUC returned to its home at Don Frana Bulića 4 to continue its mission of bringing together members of the academic community, which it has been doing continuously.
