= Marko Tadić =

Croatian mathematician

Marko Tadić (born 16 November 1953 in Tomislavgrad) is a Croatian mathematician.

== Education and career ==
Tadić graduated from the University of Zagreb with a B.S. in 1976, an M.S. in 1979, and a Ph.D. in 1980. He has been a full professor at the University of Zagreb since 1987. He has served two full-year appointments as a visiting professor at the University of Utah.

He is a fellow of the Croatian Academy of Sciences and Arts and a member of the Academia Europaea.

== Research topics ==
Tadić does research in the field of noncommutative harmonic analysis, especially the representation theory of classical groups and classification of unitary representations and its interaction with the modern theory of automorphic forms through Langlands program.

== Awards ==
Tadić won the Rudjer Boskovic Prize in 1989.
