= Svetislav Stančić International Piano Competition =

The Svetislav Stančić International Piano Competition takes place every four years (next, 5th edition in 2015) in Zagreb (Croatia. It is organized by the Croatian branch of the European Piano Teachers Association (EPTA Croatia) and Zagreb Concert Management. It is named after Svetislav Stančić. The first competition was held in 1999 and it takes place in the Vatroslav Lisinski Concert Hall in Zagreb.

The judges have included Dmitri Bashkirov, Sulamita Aronovsky, Rudolf Kehrer, Jean-François Antonioli, Jerome Rose, Radomir Melmuka, Vladimir Krpan, Julian Jacobson, Eliso Virsaladze and others.

== Prize Winners ==
Year	1st	2nd	3rd	4th
2018	not awarded	(Serbia) Aleksandar Raos	(Croatia) Ivan Vihor & (Ukraine) Vasyl Kotys	(Japan) Junichi Ito
2011	(Italy) Scipione Sangiovanni	(Russia) Andrey Gugnin	(Belgium) Stephanie Proot & (Russia) Varvara Nepomnyashchaya	not awarded
2007	(Belarus) Dzmitry Ulasiuk	(Russia) Georgy Tchaidze	(Ukraine) Ksenia Yelagina & (Russia) Fatimat Merdanova	(Croatia) Bruno Vlahek
2003	(Israel) Tali Morgulis	(Armenia) Ruben Dalibaltayan	(Estonia) Toomas Vana	(Croatia) Zrinka Ivančić
1999	(Belarus) Konstantin Krasnitsky	(Italy) Federico Gianello	(Russia) Daria Petrova	(Germany) Ragna Schirmer
