= Pavao Muhić =

Croatian lawyer and politician

Signature of Pavao Muhić

Pavao Muhić (1 January 1811 – 17 October 1897) was a lawyer and politician.

He was born in Požega. He taught as a professor of political science and cameralism at the School of the Royal Academy of Science (1835–1850) and at the Law Academy (1850–1871), where he also served as a director. He was a member of the Croatian Parliament (1861–1866), and the Head of the Department for Education and Religious Affairs of the Provincial Government of Croatia, Slavonia and Dalmatia (1872–1881). He was a regular member of the Yugoslav Academy of Sciences and Arts since 1866, and its president in 1888.

He died in Zagreb.

Academic offices
Preceded by Franjo Rački	Chairman of the Yugoslav Academy of Sciences and Arts; 1888–1890	Succeeded by Josip Torbar
