= Ivo Padovan =

Ivo Padovan (11 February 1922 – 19 December 2010) was a Croatian physician.

He was born in Blato, Korčula. M.D and D.Sc degrees he received from the University of Zagreb before continuing his studies at numerous clinics around the world. With the acquired knowledge and expertise he founded clinical audiometry in Croatia. He was a founding member and President of the Croatian League for the Fight against Cancer and for full eight years and a member of the UICC council. In 1975 he was President of Collegum Otorhinolaryngologicum Amicitiae Sacrum. From 1983 he was a full member of Croatian Academy of Arts and Sciences. For his contributions in rhinoplasty he received in 1985 an award at the International Congress of Otorhinolaryngology and Head and Neck Surgery. He died in Zagreb.

His research interests included head and neck cancer, lymphology, esthetic, plastic and reconstructive surgery, application of radioactive isotopes and application of interferon in clinical practice. He published more than 120 scientific papers, more than 200 expert medical papers and other articles and eight books in the field of Otorhinolaryngology and plastic Head and Neck Surgery. Being a student of Ante Šercer he further developed open rhinoplasty methods. He is a creator of the microlaryngostroboscope and an improved version of electronystagmography, termed vectonystagmography.

Academic offices
Preceded by Ivan Supek	Chairman of the Croatian Academy of Sciences and Arts; 1997–2004	Succeeded by Milan Moguš
