= Aleksandar Ugrenović =

Aleksandar Ugrenović (6 November 1883 – 19 November 1958) was a university professor in forestry from Croatia and Yugoslavia and a member of the Yugoslav Academy of Sciences and Arts.

Ugrenović was born in Petrinja (then Kingdom of Croatia-Slavonia). He graduated from the Faculty of Forestry (1904) and the Faculty of Philosophy (1907) of the University of Zagreb. He attained a doctoral degree from the Faculty of Philosophy in 1907. In the 1907–21 period he worked as a forester in Osijek, Slatina and Pakrac.

Between 1921 and 1956, with a brief hiatus during the World War II (1941–45), he was a full-time professor at the Faculty of Agriculture and Forestry in Zagreb in "use of forests for trade and wood industry" and "forest politics". He joined JAZU in 1948. He was also a member of the JAZU presidency, secretary of the Natural Science Department and the commissioner of the Forestry Section in the Yugoslav Academy.

Between 1925 and 1929 he edited Šumarski list (Forestry Magazine) and for a while also edited magazine Prirodoslovna istraživanja JA (Investigations of nature by the Yugoslav Academy). He initiated and later became the editor in chief of the Forestry Encyclopedia of the Yugoslav Lexicographical Institute in Zagreb.

He was a member of several international forestry organizations, such as Silva Mediterranea (Rome, 1922), Commission internationale d'agriculture (Paris, 1923), Institut internationale d'agriculture (Rome, 1934) and Union internationale des instituts de recherches forestieres (Stockholm, 1936).

Aleksandar Ugrenović died in Zagreb, at the time in SR Croatia.

== Sources ==
- Ugrenović, Aleksandar
