= Franjo Rački =

Croatian historian, politician and writer (1828–1894)

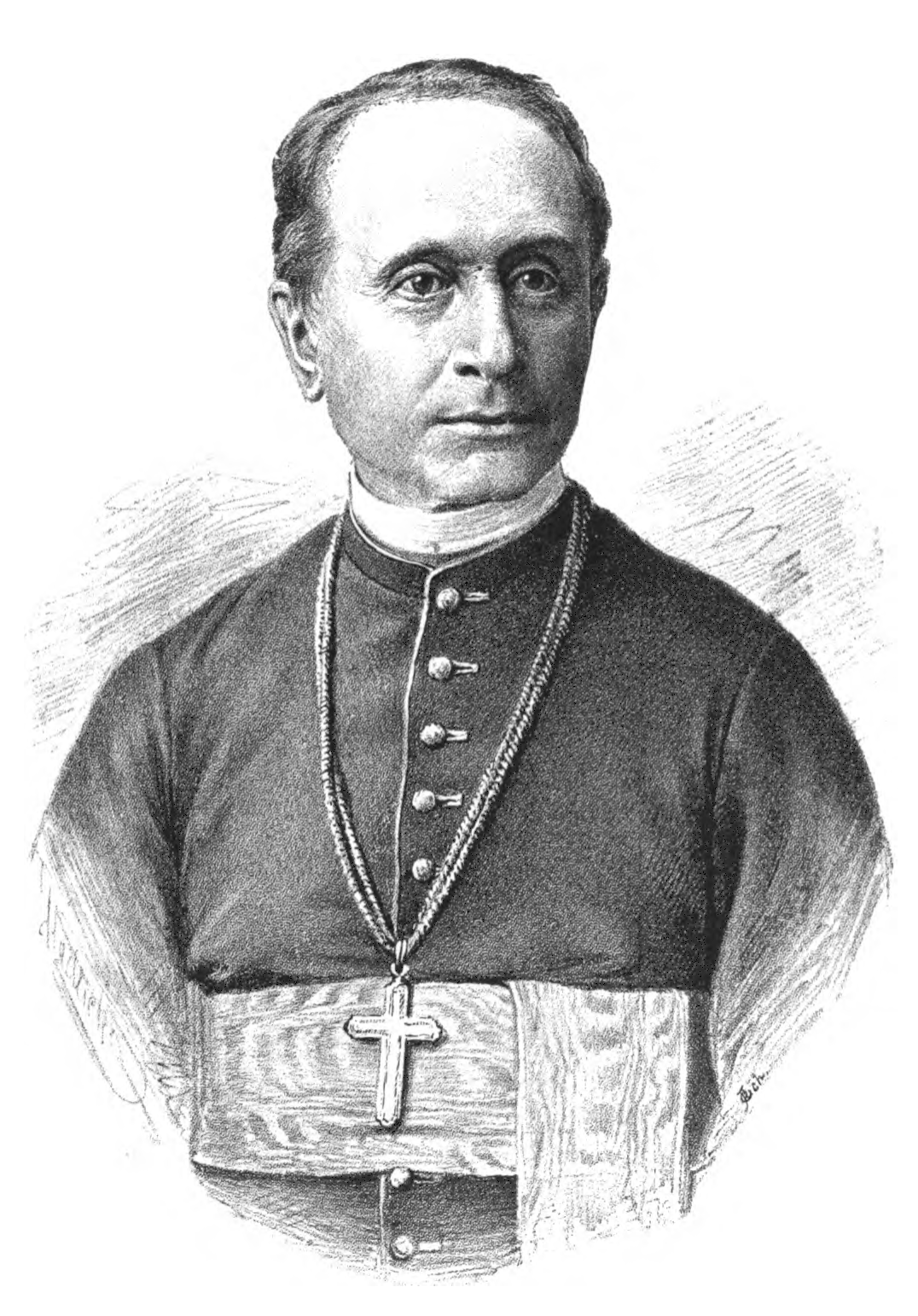
- Born: 25 November 1828; Fužine, Kingdom of Croatia, Austrian Empire
- Died: 13 February 1894 (aged 65); Zagreb, Kingdom of Croatia-Slavonia, Austria-Hungary
- Occupations: Historian, politician, writer

Franjo Rački (25 November 1828 – 13 February 1894) was a Croatian historian, politician, writer, and Catholic priest. He compiled important collections of old Croatian diplomatic and historical documents, wrote some pioneering historical works, and was a key founder of the Yugoslav Academy of Sciences and Arts.

== Biography ==
=== Historian ===
Rački was born in Fužine, near Rijeka in 1828. He completed his secondary education in Senj and Varaždin. He graduated in theology in Senj, where he was ordained Catholic priest in 1852. He received his PhD in theology in Vienna in 1855.

His career as a historian began as soon as he started working as a teacher in Senj. He organized the research of Glagolitic documents on the islands of Kvarner. He went to the village of Baška on Krk, the location of the famous Baška Tablet where he analyzed them, and published Viek i djelovanje sv. Cirilla i Methoda slavjamkih apošlolov (The Age and Activities of Saints Cyril and Methodius, the Apostles among the Slavs).

In 1857, he was moved from Senj to Rome. There, he attended the Pontifical Croatian College of St. Jerome for three years, studying the history of South Slavic heretics (Glagolitics, Bogomils and Patarens). He went around Roman archives in search of documents on Croatian history, helping to lay the foundations for Croatian medieval studies.

In Rome, he found many documents on the Bogomils, collected by the Catholic Church during the medieval struggle against that heresy. He would publish Bogomili i Patareni, a milestone in the research on the Bosnian Church. In the book, Rački founded the "Bogomil hypothesis", saying that the Bosnian Church was influenced by the dualist heretic teachings from Bulgaria, originating in the 9th century. As it was very controversial and intriguing, that theory dominated research for most of the 19th and 20th centuries, but its general premises have been mostly refuted.

Although Rački is more important as a promoter of culture than as a historian, his original historical works are important for their pioneering nature and wealth of information. In addition to his work on the Bogomils, he also wrote Povjesnik Ivan Lučić (The Historian Joannes Lucius), Nutarnje stanje Hrvatske prije XII. stoljeća (The Internal Organization of Croatia Before the 12th Century), Stari grb bosanski (The Old Bosnian Coat of Arms), Povelje bosanskog kralja Tvrtka (Documents of the Bosnian king Tvrtko). The pinnacle of his scientific work is the monumental Documenta historiae Croaticae periodum antiaquam illustrantia.

=== Politician ===
In 1860, he returned to Zagreb and founded the People's Party together with his close friend Josip Juraj Strossmayer. Rački was a partisan of the idea of Yugoslavia and fought for Croatian autonomy against Austrian rule. Both he and Strossmayer promoted the cultural and political unity of the South Slavs. During the 1860s, he was a member of the Croatian Parliament.

Rački was a prolific political writer. He wrote about all the important Croatia-related topics and issues of his time. He promoted the merging of Dalmatia with Croatia ruled by the ban, he wrote discussions about the Croatian nature of Srijem and Rijeka, but he spent most energy on analyzing the relationships between Croatia and Hungary, fighting against the Hungarian expansionism.

Following the Croatian–Hungarian Settlement in 1868 and his party's alliance with the Hungarian government in 1873, he quit politics. He re-emerged in the 1880s, forming the Independent People's Party.

He died in Zagreb on 13 February 1894.

== Academy ==
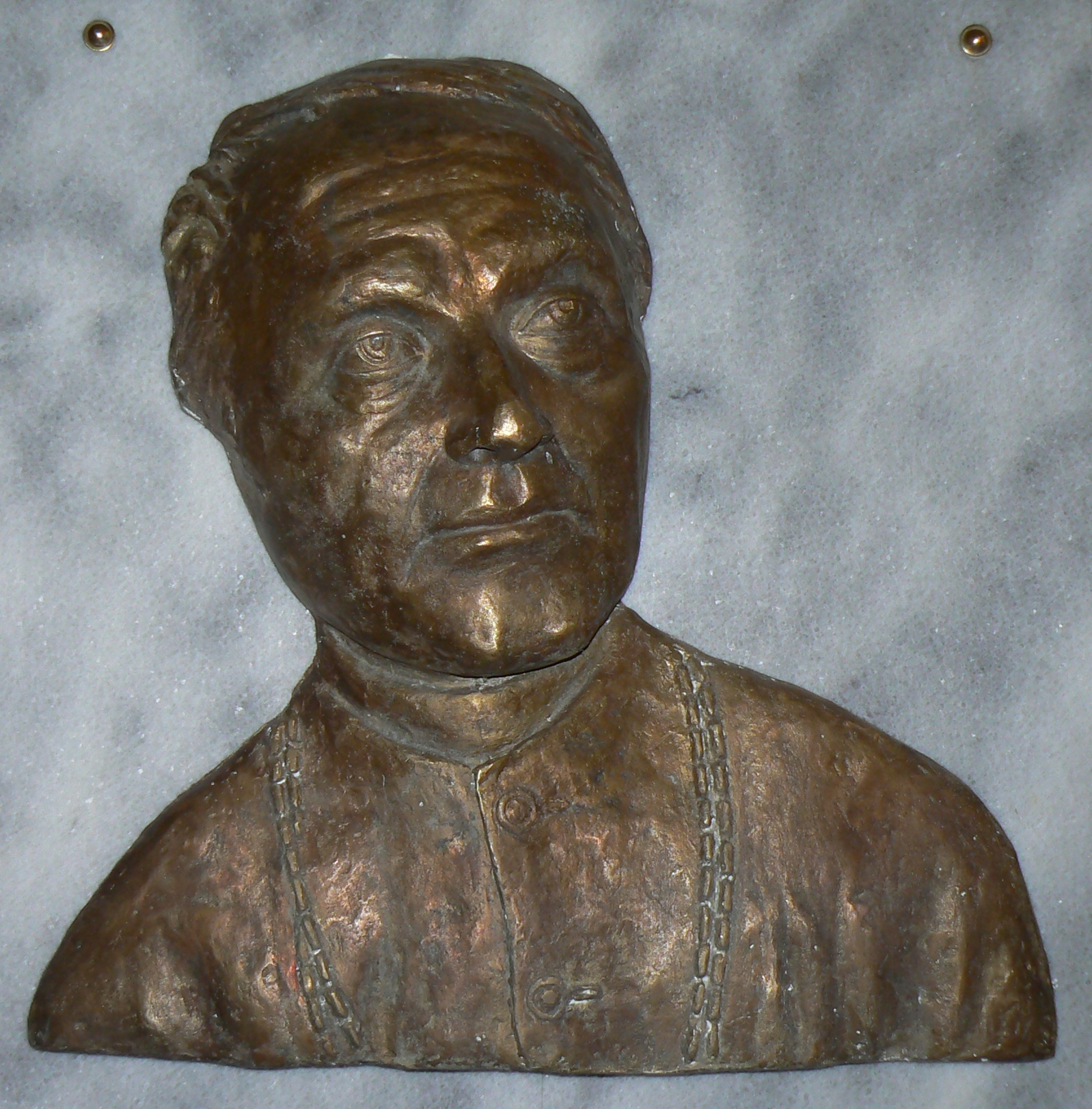
Bas-relief of Franjo Rački

He started Književnik, the first Croatian scientific magazine for history and linguistics, and Obzor and Vijenac, influential magazines for culture and politics. He was a key founder of the Yugoslavian Academy of Sciences and Arts and greatly contributed to the expansion of the University of Zagreb.

Rački founded most editions of the Academy, which are published even today: Rad, Starine, and the Codex diplomaticus Regni Croatiae, Dalmatiae et Slavoniae, an exceptional monument of legal history. He founded the Academy library, archive and dictionary. His activities determined the work of the Academy for several decades, especially in its cultural and social aspects.

Cultural offices
Preceded by Post created	President of Matica hrvatska 1866–1886	Succeeded by Pavao Muhić
Academic offices
Preceded by Post created	Chairman of Yugoslav Academy of Sciences and Arts; 1866–1887	Succeeded by Pavao Muhić
