= Branka Musulin =

German-Croatian classical pianist and teacher

Branka Musulin (6 August 1917 - 1 January 1975) was a German-Croatian classical pianist and teacher.

== Life ==
Musulin was born in Croatia in Zagreb. As from the age of eight, she studied with celebrated Croatian pianist Svetislav Stančić in Zagreb and played in public at that time. After her concert diploma, she travelled to Paris in 1936 to study with Alfred Cortot and Yvonne Lefébure. As from 1938, she studied with Alfredo Casella in Siena and after 1941 with Max von Pauer in South Germany .

In 1944, she married Friedrich Bienert in Dresden, they had one daughter. Branka Musulin played under the baton of Hans Müller-Kray, Willem Mengelberg, Hermann Abendroth, Franz Konwitschny, Karl Böhm, Georg Solti and Sergiu Celibidache. In 1958, she became lecturer, later professor at the Hochschule für Musik und Darstellende Kunst in Frankfurt. She died in 1975 in Schmallenberg.

== Recordings ==
- Ludwig van Beethoven, Piano Concerto No. 4, opus 58, Leipzig radio orchestra, conducted by Hermann Abendroth, recorded mars 27, 1950
- Frédéric Chopin, Piano Concerto No. 1 (Chopin) E minor Op. 11, Stuttgart Suddeutscher Rundfunks Symphony Orchestra, conducted by Hans Müller-Kray
- Frédéric Chopin, Piano Concerto No. 2 (Chopin) F minor Op. 21, Stuttgart Suddeutscher Rundfunks Symphony Orchestra, conducted by Hans Müller-Kray
- Ludwig van Beethoven, Sonatas nos 17 (D minor, Op 31 No 3) and 32 (C minor, Op 111). Oriole MG 20104 (stereo SMG 20105 [sic]). Reviewed in Gramophone magazine, March 1965.

== Bibliography ==
- Ernst Krause, Josef Hegenbarth: Das Bildnis Branka Musulins. Verlag der Kunst, 1958 - German
- Moritz von Bredow: Klang gewordener Geist. Branka Musulin zum 100. Geburtstag. Eine Hommage. Frankfurter Allgemeine Zeitung v. 14. August 2017, S. 10.
