= Velimir Neidhardt =

Croatian architect

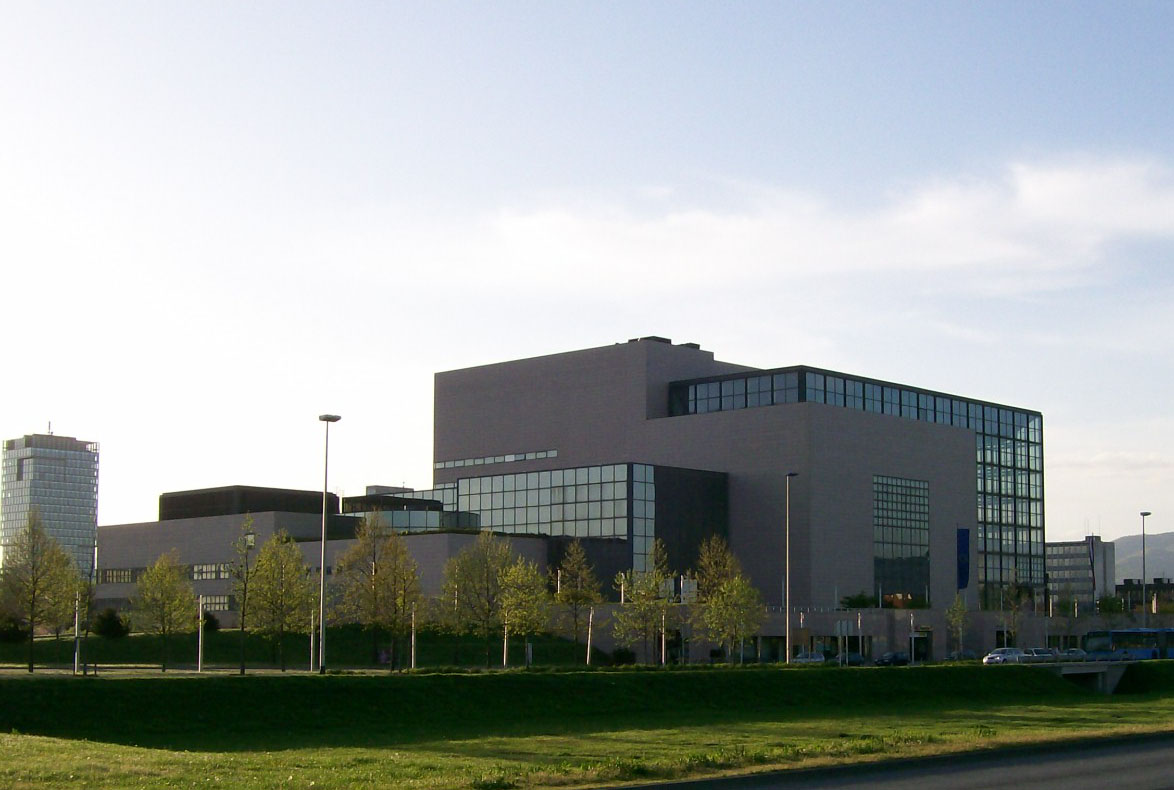
National and University Library in Zagreb

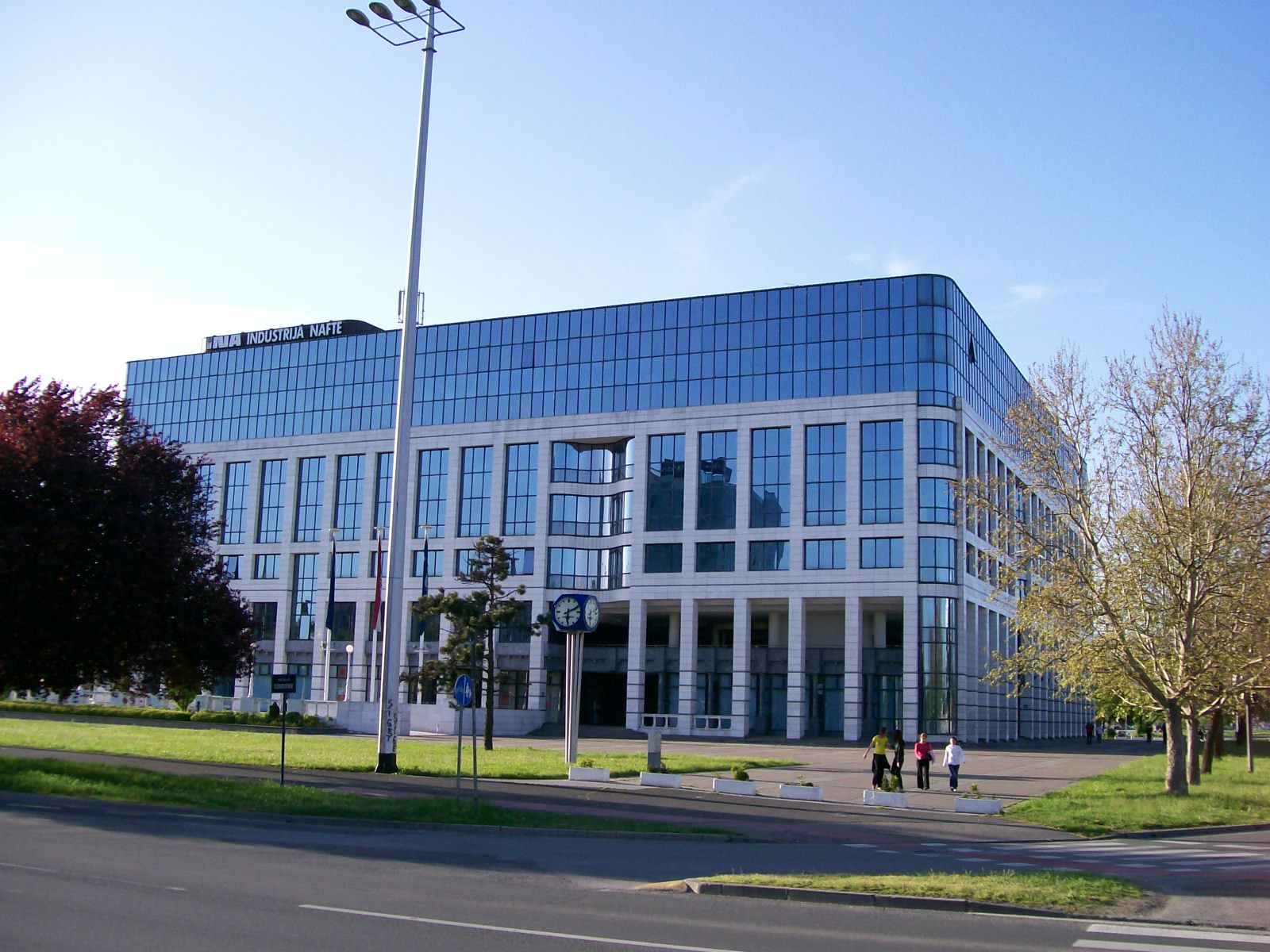
INA building (1989)

Velimir Neidhardt (Croatian pronunciation: [ʋêlimiːr nǎjtxart]; born 7 October 1943) is a Croatian architect, president of the Croatian Academy of Sciences and Arts from 2019 to 2026.

Neidhardt is a professor at the University of Zagreb Faculty of Architecture, former president of the Croatian Architects' Association (1995–1999), and a full member of the Croatian Academy of Sciences and Arts (since 1991). Since June 2015, he is also a corresponding member of the Slovenian Academy of Sciences and Arts.

Neidhardt's most important work is the building of the National and University Library in Zagreb.

== Major projects ==
- Hotel Lapad (with I. Kolbach and B. Šavora; Dubrovnik, 1969)
- Hotel Begova Ledina (Makarska, 1969)
- Bit Pazar Shopping Centre (with I. Franić; Skopje, 1970)
- Shopping Centre (Mrkonjić Grad, 1972)
- City Centre (with Lj. Lulić and J. Nosso; Banja Luka, 1973–79)
- New Zagreb City Centre (with L. Schwerer and B. Velnić; 1971)
- French Republic Square (with I. Franić; Zagreb, 1977)
- Hamma Centre (with Z. Krznarić; Algiers, 1984)
- Telecommunications Building (Šibenik, 1980)
- National and University Library (with M. Hržić, Z. Krznarić and D. Mance; Zagreb, 1978–95)
- Zagreb urban axis (1981–85)
- Ina Trgovina Building (Zagreb, 1985–89)
- Exportdrvo Office Building (Zagreb, 1985)
- Adriatic Pipeline Headquarters (Zagreb, 1989–91)
- World Trade Centre (with Z. Krznarić and D. Mance; Zagreb, 1991)
- Metropolitan axis (with Z. Krznarić and D. Mance; Zagreb, 1992)
- St. John the Evangelist Church (Zagreb, 1991)
- Parish Church (Zagreb, 1994)
- Badel City Block (with M. Begović and D. Mance; Zagreb, 1992–96)
- Croatian Government Centre (Zagreb, 1996)

== Bibliography ==
- Vukić, Fedja (2001). Velimir Neidhardt: arhitektura grada [Velimir Neidhardt: Urban Architecture] (PDF) (in Croatian and English). Zagreb. ISBN 953-206-028-6.

Academic offices
Preceded by Zvonko Kusić	Chairman of the Croatian Academy of Sciences and Arts; 2019–2026	Succeeded by Davor Miličić
