= Ivan Supek =

Croatian physicist (1915–2007)

- Born: 8 April 1915; Zagreb, Kingdom of Croatia-Slavonia, Austria-Hungary
- Died: 5 March 2007 (aged 91); Zagreb, Croatia
- Scientific career
- Fields: Physics, philosophy
- Workplaces: University of Zagreb, Croatian Academy of Sciences and Arts

Ivan Supek (8 April 1915 – 5 March 2007) was a Croatian physicist, philosopher, writer, playwright, peace activist, and humanist.

== Early years and education ==
Supek was born in Zagreb, Croatia (still nominally under Austria-Hungary). His father, Rudolf, a chimney sweep, and his mother, Marija Šips, were married in Đakovo in 1912. He later moved to Zagreb, where he organized a local section of the Young Communist League of Yugoslavia at his high school, and remained a member of the League until the Hitler-Stalin Pact. On one occasion, he secretly smuggled a briefcase to a man in Vienna he later discovered was Josip Broz Tito. After finishing grammar school in Zagreb in 1934, he continued his education in Vienna for a brief period, and then moved to Zürich to study mathematics, physics, biology, and philosophy. Increasingly interested in quantum physics and its philosophical consequences, he moved to Leipzig and obtained his PhD in physics in 1940 under Werner Heisenberg. He worked on problems of superconductivity, but ultimately his doctoral dissertation was on electrical conductivity in metals in low temperatures. In March 1941, he was arrested by the Gestapo for being involved in antifascist activity and was held in prison for many months. His professors Heisenberg, Hund, and von Weizsäcker intervened to secure his release from prison. Immediately upon his release, instead of returning to Leipzig, he went back to the Independent State of Croatia and joined the communist antifascist Yugoslav Partisans movement. Supek would not return to physics research again, focusing instead on his philosophical and literary work.

== Public activity ==
Supek was a proponent of total and unconditional nuclear disarmament. In 1944, fourteen months before the bombing of Hiroshima, he warned about the danger of misusing atomic energy.

In 1946 he became a professor of theoretical physics at the University of Zagreb. His main contribution to physics was the discovery of the differential equation for electrical conductivity at low temperatures. In 1950 he advocated for the construction of the Ruđer Bošković Institute in Zagreb and became one of its founders. He was excluded from the institute in 1958 due to his disagreement with the Yugoslav Federal Commission for Nuclear Energy and his unwillingness to participate in a project to build the atomic bomb (an idea Josip Broz Tito himself did not like much, and which was subsequently abandoned). After that, he stopped active research in theoretical physics and continued researching philosophy and literature.

In 1960 he was accepted into the Yugoslav Academy of Sciences and Arts (since 1991 the Croatian Academy of Sciences and Arts), of which he was president from 1991 to 1997. In 1960 he founded the Institute for the Philosophy of Science and Peace as a section of the Yugoslav Academy of Sciences and Arts. The institute was also a center of the nuclear disarmament movement, the Pugwash Conference in Yugoslavia; Supek was one of the founders and a member of its Permanent Committee. In 1968 he became the rector of the University of Zagreb, serving two terms until 1972, during the turbulent times of the Croatian Spring. In 1970 he initiated the establishment of the Inter-University Centre Dubrovnik (IUC). He was also one of the founders of the international organization World Without the Bomb. After numerous disputes and arguments with the government, he was interrupted in his public activity in 1971. Among other incidents, he was put on a "black list" because of his involvement in the Croatian Spring movement.

In 1976 he signed the Dubrovnik-Philadelphia Statement along with Philip Noel-Baker, Ava Helen Pauling, Linus Pauling, Aurelio Peccei and Sophia Wadai. He participated at the Philadelphia Congress of World Unity in 1976. He formulated his famous ten humanistic principles, which were more or less repeated at every later peace summit and event. He also established the International League of Humanists.

== Later years ==
Supek visited and lectured at numerous foreign universities. He retired in 1985 but continued his humanist work. He founded a citizen's association, Alijansa za treću Hrvatsku (Alliance for the Third Croatia). He was a critic of globalisation and a proponent of the global justice movement. In 2002 he was elected an honorary member of the Academy of Sciences and Arts of Bosnia and Herzegovina.

Supek died on 5 March 2007, in his home in Zagreb, after a long illness.

In 2007, shortly after his death, the X Gymnasium in Croatia's capital Zagreb was renamed in his honor. He is among 24 famous Croats to be inducted into the Croatian Walk Of Fame.

== Controversy over Heisenberg – Bohr 1941 meeting ==
In one of his last interviews in March 2006, Supek spoke about the famous and controversial meeting between Werner Heisenberg and Niels Bohr in Copenhagen in September 1941. According to Supek, he was informed about the meeting in confidence by Bohr's wife Margrethe. In his interview, Supek claimed that the main figure of the meeting was neither Heisenberg nor Bohr but Carl Friedrich von Weizsäcker: "Heisenberg and von Weizsäcker came to Bohr in German army uniforms. Von Weizsäcker's idea, probably originating from his father who was Ribbentrop's deputy, was to persuade Bohr to mediate for peace between Great Britain and Germany."

Although Margrethe allegedly thought Supek would never reveal these details publicly, Supek felt it was "his duty to announce these facts so that future generations can know the truth about the Heisenberg – Bohr meeting."

== Disputes with president Tuđman ==
Supek had many disputes with the first president of independent Croatia, Franjo Tuđman. In a 1997 "open letter" which he also read on national television and published in all the major dailies, president Tuđman accused Supek, then President of the Academy of Arts and Sciences, of supporting forces that allegedly plotted his assassination after Supek made public statements critical of presidential policies: he called for Tuđman to submit to public scrutiny his financial assets before and after the war. Supek had been a critic of Tuđman's political faux pas since Tuđman took office in 1990. Following the publication of the letter, Supek and his family suffered numerous death threats.

== Literary works ==
Besides his scientific and humanist work, Supek wrote numerous novels and plays, with themes ranging from philosophy to science fiction to politics. Across his works, Supek developed a worldview in which the values of freedom, responsibility, and democracy are integrated with his philosophical-scientific reflections.

In 1966 he started a journal, Encyclopedia moderna. His novel Proces stoljeća (The Process of the Century) is about the security clearance proceedings against the physicist Robert Oppenheimer. A list of Supek's works can be found on the Croatian Academy of Sciences and Arts homepage.

== Quotes ==
- About science and humanism in 1995:

"The diversity of the world cannot be overcome in a political system; whoever tried to do that only produced tyranny and misery. The richness of plurality and diversity will only be increased in the future. All the European and world organizations are not enough, and cannot be effective if not inspired by the universal spirit and consciousness nourished by science and art."

== See also ==
- List of peace activists

Academic offices
Preceded by Jakov Sirotković	Rector of the University of Zagreb; 1968–1972	Succeeded by Predrag Vranicki
Preceded by Jakov Sirotković	President of the Croatian Academy of Sciences and Arts; 1991–1997	Succeeded by Ivo Padovan
