= Zvonko Kusić =

Croatian physician

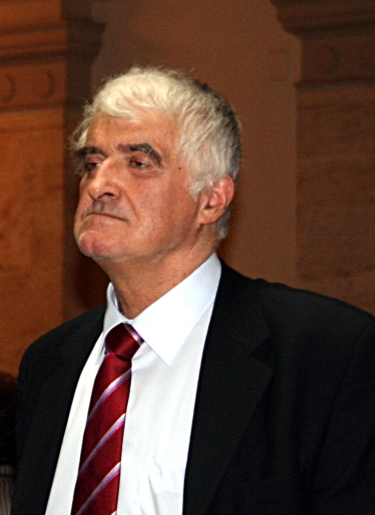

Chairman of the Croatian Academy of Sciences and Arts
- In office 1 January 2011 – 31 December 2018
- Preceded by: Milan Moguš
- Succeeded by: Velimir Neidhardt

Personal details
- Born: 14 June 1946 (age 80) Zagreb, PR Croatia, FPR Yugoslavia (modern Croatia)
- Education: University of Zagreb
- Profession: Physician

Zvonko Kusić (pronounced [ˌzʋǒːŋko ˈkǔːsit͜ɕ]) (born 14 June 1946) is a Croatian physician who is professor of oncology and nuclear medicine and head of the Department of Oncology and Nuclear Medicine of the Sisters of Charity University Hospital in Zagreb. He was president of the Croatian Academy of Sciences and Arts (HAZU) from 2011 till 2018. He is a Fellow of the Croatian Academy of Sciences and Arts (FCA).

== Biography ==
=== Early life ===
Kusić was born on 14 June 1946 in Zagreb.

=== Medical career ===
He received a Doctor of Medicine from the Faculty of Medicine at the University of Zagreb), specializing in nuclear medicine, radiotherapy and oncology. Since 1992 he has been full professor there. Since 1990 he has been the head of the Department of Oncology and Nuclear Medicine of the Sisters of Mercy University Hospital in Zagreb.

He has been President of the Croatian Academy of Sciences and Arts (HAZU) since 1 January 2011, having previously been an associate member from 1992 to 2000 and full member since 2000, in addition to being Secretary of the Department of Medical Sciences and member of the presidency from 2004 to 2010.

=== Administrative positions ===
He is the founder of the Croatian Thyroid Society, and was formerly its chairman. He was also chairman of the Thyroid Diseases Reference Center and chairman of the Commission on Endemic Goiter and Iodine Prophylaxis of the Ministry of Health and Social Care since 1992.

He initiated the new Act on Salt Iodination, which was adopted in 1996. The result of that action was the elimination of goiter and other disorders caused by iodine deficiency, which was acknowledged by the International Council for Control of Iodine Deficiency Disorders (ICCIDD).

As of 2012 he is a member of the Croatian National Health Council as well as a member of the Regional Council for Biomedical Sciences at the Ministry of Science, Education and Sports. Other memberships include Council for Nuclear Medicine and of the Council for Oncology and Radiotherapy of the Ministry of Health and Social Care and the board of directors of the Croatian Oncology Society.

=== Research ===
Kusić received scientific training and was an invited professor at Guy's Hospital in London, Michigan University in Ann Arbor, Cornell University in New York and the Mayo Clinic Endocrine Course among others.

Among his specialties are malignant tumors. In this area, he has successfully cooperated with some of the world's most prestigious medical centers, organizations and leading experts, such as William Henry Beierwaltes, David Becker, Eugen Saenger and others.

He has published over 600 publications, a substantial number of which is indexed in tertiary publications and cited. He has authored or edited a number of scientific and professional books, encyclopedic editions and textbooks. He was the principal researcher in a series of Croatian and a number of major international scientific projects.

=== Memberships ===
Zvonko Kusić, FCA, is member of a series of professional and scientific Croatian and international associations and the representative of Croatia at the International Council for the Control of Iodine Deficiency Disorders; he is further editor-in-chief of the Bulletin of the Croatian Thyroid Society, associate editor-in-chief of the Libri Oncologici journal, and member of the editorial board of The Thyroid Gland – Clinical and Experimental. He used to be editor-in-chief of the internationally indexed Acta Clinica Croatica journal (Medline / Science Citation Index Expended).

=== Awards ===
His awards include:

- Order of Danica Hrvatska
- Croatian Academy of Sciences and Arts Award for exceptional and permanent contribution to medical science
- Croatian Life Achievement Award for Science
- Homeland's Gratitude Medal
- Order of the Croatian Trefoil

== Sources ==
- Zvonko Kusić biography at the Croatian Academy of Sciences and Arts website

Academic offices
Preceded by Milan Moguš	Chairman of the Croatian Academy of Sciences and Arts; 2011–2018	Succeeded by Velimir Neidhardt
