= Hans Müller-Kray =

German conductor

Hans Müller-Kray (13 October 1908 – 30 May 1969) was a German conductor, music director and academic teacher.

== Life and career ==
Hans Müller was born in Essen-Kray. He grew up as the youngest of 14 children of the mining foreman Karl Müller, who from 1882 until his death in July 1937 was the leader of the local miners' music corps (Knappenmusikkorps). Müller learned to play the piano and cello while still at school. After completing primary school and grammar school, he first turned to commercial training, but then studied music at the Folkwangschule. He passed the final examination as a state-certified music teacher. He worked as a choral conductor and pianist, touring the world as an accompanist. He directed choirs in Essen-Werden and Essen-Steele.

He was Kapellmeister at the Stadttheater Essen, the municipal opera of Essen from 1932. In the 1933/34 season, he was the pianist of the ballet Der Grüne Tisch, worked with Kurt Jooss, also on a tour in Germany and other countries. From 1934 to 1941, he was Kapellmeister at the Theater Münster. He became Kapellmeister of the Reichssender Frankfurt broadcaster on 15 May 1942.

After World War II, he was Kapellmeister at the Staatstheater Wiesbaden from 1945 to 1948. In 1948, he was appointed by the Office of Military Government, United States as head of the main music department and at the same time chief conductor of the Stuttgart Radio Symphony Orchestra of Süddeutscher Rundfunk. He worked in this double function until his death, with the title Generalmusikdirektor from 1951. He cultivated the broad symphonic repertoire, including contemporary music which had been suppressed under the Nazi regime. He also conducted opera, including over 30 complete recordings.

He changed his surname to Müller-Kray officially on 22 June 1955. He taught at the Musikhochschule Stuttgart from 1958, appointed professor in 1961.

Müller-Kray died at his workplace in the Stuttgart Funkhaus of sudden heart failure at the age of 60. His grave is in the cemetery of Steinenbronn.

== Recordings ==
Müller-Kray conducted in 1951 the first complete recording of Schumann's opera Genoveva with the forces of the Staatsoper Stuttgart, including Friederike Sailer in the title role. The same year, he conducted a radio production of Verdi's Ernani. He led several recordings with the tenor Fritz Wunderlich, including Cherubini's Der Wasserträger.
