= Milan Moguš =

Croatian linguist (1927–2017)

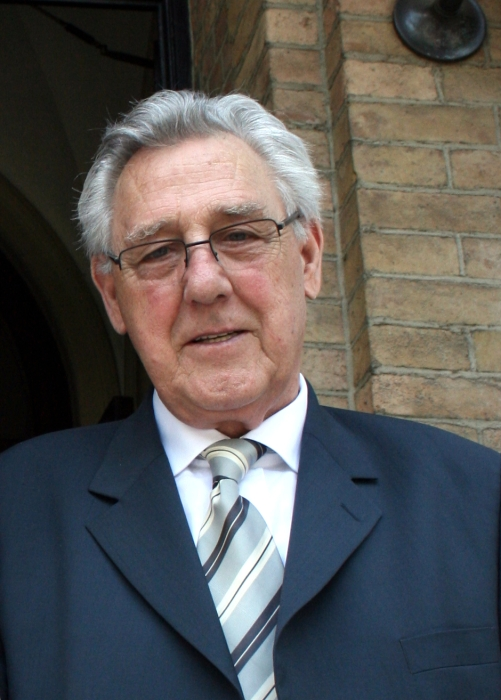
- Moguš in June 2008

Chairman of the Croatian Academy of Sciences and Arts
- In office 1 January 2004 – 11 November 2010
- Preceded by: Ivo Padovan
- Succeeded by: Zvonko Kusić

Personal details
- Born: 27 April 1927 Senj, Kingdom of Serbs, Croats and Slovenes (modern Croatia)
- Died: 19 November 2017 (aged 90) Zagreb, Croatia
- Education: University of Zagreb
- Profession: Linguist

Milan Moguš (Croatian pronunciation: [mǐlan môɡuːʃ]; 27 April 1927 – 19 November 2017) was a Croatian linguist and academician.

== Biography ==
Moguš was born in Senj, where he finished primary school and high school. In the academic year 1948/49 he attended in Faculty of Philosophy in Zagreb and graduated in 1953. In the same year he was elected as assistant to the academy's Institute for Language, and in 1956 he performed the same duties at the Faculty of Philosophy at University in Zagreb in the Department for Dialectology and History of Croatian. From 1961 until 1963 he was a lecturer in Croatian at University of Warsaw.

He received his doctorate of philology sciences in 1962 at University in Zagreb. In 1964 he became docent, in 1969 he was associate professor, and in 1975 he was full professor at the university. From 1965 until his retirement in 1992 he was chairman of the Department for Dialectology and History of Croatian. In school years 1970/71 and 1971/72 he was a professor at Faculty of Philosophy. At the same faculty from 1976 he taught postgraduate studies of linguistic direction, and from 1979 until 1985 he was a leader of that postgraduate study. Since 1983 until 1992 he was a head of the Institute for Linguistics of Faculty of Philosophy.

He taught as a guest professor at universities in Cologne and Mannheim. For a long time he was a member of International Committee for Onomastic Science in Leuven, and member of International Committee for Phonetics and Phonology of Slavic Languages in Moscow and also president of the Interacademic Committee of Onomastics in Zagreb. In 1997 he became a member of Central European Academy of Science and Art. From 1998 until 2002 he was a president of the Croatian Commission for UNESCO.

In 1977 he was elected to associate membership of the Croatian Academy of Science and Arts, and in 1986 he became a full member. From 1985 until 1991 he was a secretary of the academy's Class for the Science of Philology. From 1991 until 1997 he was secretary-general of the academy, and from 1998 until 2003 he was vice-president of the Croatian Academy of Science and Arts. Since 1 January 2004 until 11 November 2010 he has been president of the Croatian Academy of Science and Arts.

Moguš was an editor in chief or co-author of many magazines and editions, like "Bulletin of the Institute for Linguistics of Faculty of Philosophy", "Bulletin scientifique", "Works of Institute for Slavic Philology", "Croatian Dialectology Collection", "Language", "Old Croatian Writers", "Works of Croatian Academy of Science and Arts", "Pauline Collection", "Senj Glagolitic circle 1248 - 1508", "Cithara octochorda". As a general-secretary of the academy he was editor in chief of "Yearbook of Croatian Academy of Science and Arts" (1992–1998), and as a vice-president he wrote "Memorial: 140 years of Croatian Academy of Science and Arts". He was also editor of linguistic profession in "Croatian Biographical Lexicon" and Co-Author of "Dictionary of Croatian literature from Croatian national revival until Ivan Goran Kovačić and collected works of Marko Marulić.

Until his retirement in 1992 as a principal researcher in Institute of Linguistics of Faculty of Philosophy, Moguš led the research project Study of Croatian. He led another research project, Study of Croatian Dialects, at the Institute of Linguistic Study of Croatian Academy of Science and Arts.

He died on 19 November 2017 in Zagreb, aged 90.

== Works ==
He published by himself or as a co-author these works:

- Scholarly monographs: "Today's Speech in Senj", "Phonological Development of Croatian Language", "Chakavian Dialect", "Antun Mažuranić, Azbukoprotres (Alphabetical Earthquake) of Savo Mrkalj", "Križanić's Croatian Grammar", "Law of Trsat", "History of Croatian Literary Language" (published in Croatian, English and German), "Croatian Language in Croatian Sabor" (published in Croatian and English), "Ivan Mažuranić: Death of Smail Aga Čengić;
- 4 computer concordance works of Croatian writers;
- 6 dictionaries: Croatian-English, Croatian-French, "Hrvatski čestotni rječnik", "Dictionary of Marulić's Judita", Slownik polsko-chorwacki (Polish-Croatian dictionary), "Dictionary of Senj";
- Critical editions of two Marulić's works (Judita and Naslidovanje);
- Manual "Croatian Orthography" (until now 9 editions);
- About 270 scientific and technical studies and articles in the field of Croatian and Slavic philology and linguistics in over 60 domestic and foreign journals

Academic offices
Preceded by Ivo Padovan	Chairman of the Croatian Academy of Sciences and Arts; 2004–2010	Succeeded by Zvonko Kusić
