= Svetislav Stančić =

Croatian pianist (1895–1970)

Svetislav Stančić (7 July 1895 in Zagreb – 7 January 1970 in Zagreb) was a Croatian pianist and music pedagogue.

Stančić initially studied piano in Zagreb and then moved to Berlin where he studied with Karl Heinrich Barth, Conrad Ansorge, and Ferruccio Busoni, who also taught him composition. Stančić had a career as a concert pianist, and later he became legendary Professor of Piano at the Music Academy in Zagreb. He was a member of the Yugoslav Academy of Sciences and Arts and a corresponding member of the Serbian Academy of Sciences and Arts. In 1960 he received the Vladimir Nazor Award for lifetime achievement in music.

Some of his notable students included Ivo Maček, Branka Musulin and Vladimir Krpan. The International Piano Competition Svetislav Stančić is named after him.

== Literature ==
- Moritz von Bredow: Klang gewordener Geist. Branka Musulin zum 100. Geburtstag. Eine Hommage. Frankfurter Allgemeine Zeitung v. 14. August 2017, S. 10.
