= Anton Švajger =

- Born: 6 June 1935; Daruvar
- Died: 16 December 2003 (aged 68); Zagreb
- Known for: Innovations in Embryology
- Children: 2
- Scientific career
- Fields: Embryology
- Workplaces: Faculty of Medicine in the University of Zagreb

Anton Švajger (Daruvar, 6 June 1935 – Zagreb, 16 December 2003) was a Croatian academic, doctor, and a professor at the Faculty of Medicine in the University of Zagreb. He is best known for his work on embryology.

== Career ==
He was born on 6 June, 1935 in Daruvar to mother Jelka (born Klobučarić), and his father, Anton, a colonel. His family was diverse, with his paternal grandfather coming from Bavaria, his paternal grandmother coming from Slovenia, and his maternal grandmother coming from Czechia, however he self-identified as a Croat. He finished his primary school education in Daruvar, before moving to Virovitica in 1949. to finish his secondary school education at the Real gymnasium in Virovitica.

He finished his medical education at the Faculty of Medicine in the University of Zagreb, studying from 1954 to 1960. At the same university in 1965, he received a Doctor of Medical Sciences degree. During 1968. he finished a 6 month advanced training of advanced embryology at the Hubrecht laboratory in Utrecht. Right after his diploma, Švajger got employed at the Institute of Histology and Embryology of the Faculty of Medicine in the University of Zagreb, where he spent his entire working life, until he retired on September 30, 2000. After defending his habilitation thesis called: Mutual Relationships of the Chorioallantoic Membrane and the Transplanted Embryo, in 1969. he was promoted to the position of Assistant Professor.

In his scientific work, Švajger was primarily focused on studying the core principles of early mammalian development. He paid attention to studying the role of germ cells in early embryogenesis; one of his most well-known studies was Separation of germ layers in presomite rat embryos.

During his career, he applied many available scientific methods, from classical descriptive histomorphological analysis and electron microscopy, to histochemistry and immunochemistry. He was especially notable in the field of experimental developmental biology using his own isolation method, and micromanipulation and transplantation of the early stages of mammalian embryonic development at the level of implantation, and their study both in vivo and in vitro. In the field of assigned scientific tasks, he gave answers and academic results on questions about the developmental processes of early mammalian embryogenesis. His career was extensive and diverse, particularly in the field of medical encyclopedias. He successfully passed on a high level of knowledge and expertise to colleagues and students. Švajger delivered many public lectures on topics in medicine, general biology, the history of medicine, and medical ethics, showing general and biomedical knowledge. His professional activities also included writing teaching materials, adding chapters to monographs and handbooks for after graduate education, and supporting the continued professional development of physicians. During his career, Švajger also:

- Collaborated with the educational program of RTV Zagreb from its inception in 1968, producing seven biology-related programs, from 1969 up to the late 1980s
- Lectured at many professional and popular science events for audiences of various backgrounds and authored several popular science articles.
- Contributed over 500 entries to the Medical Lexicon of the Miroslav Krleža Lexicographic Institute.
- Worked as a translator and editor for textbooks and professional articles.

== Personal life ==
Švajger was multilingual, speaking German, Italian, Russian, French and English. In his free time, Švajger was interested in botany, ornithology, astronomy, painting and philosophy. He had two sons, Ivan and Anton. His grandson, also named Anton, is currently a professional wrestler.

After three years of retirement, he died on 16 December 2003.
