= Artur Schneider =

German footballer

Personal information
- Date of birth: 1 May 1993 (age 33)
- Place of birth: Germany
- Position: Midfielder

Youth career
- FC Phönix Kleinblittersdorf
- –2011: 1. FC Saarbrücken

Senior career*
Years	Team	Apps	(Gls)
2011–2014	1. FC Saarbrücken II	39	(10)
2012–2014	1. FC Saarbrücken	16	(0)
2014–2017	SV Röchling Völklingen		
- * Club domestic league appearances and goals

Artur Schneider (born 1 May 1993) is a German former professional footballer who played as a midfielder.

== Career ==
Schneider came through 1. FC Saarbrücken's youth setup, and made his first-team debut in July 2012, when he replaced Markus Hayer in a 3. Liga match against VfL Osnabrück. After Saarbrücken were relegated at the end of the 2013–14 season, Schneider was released by the club and signed for SV Röchling Völklingen.
