= Ivan Vihor =

Croatian pianist and chess player (born 1997)

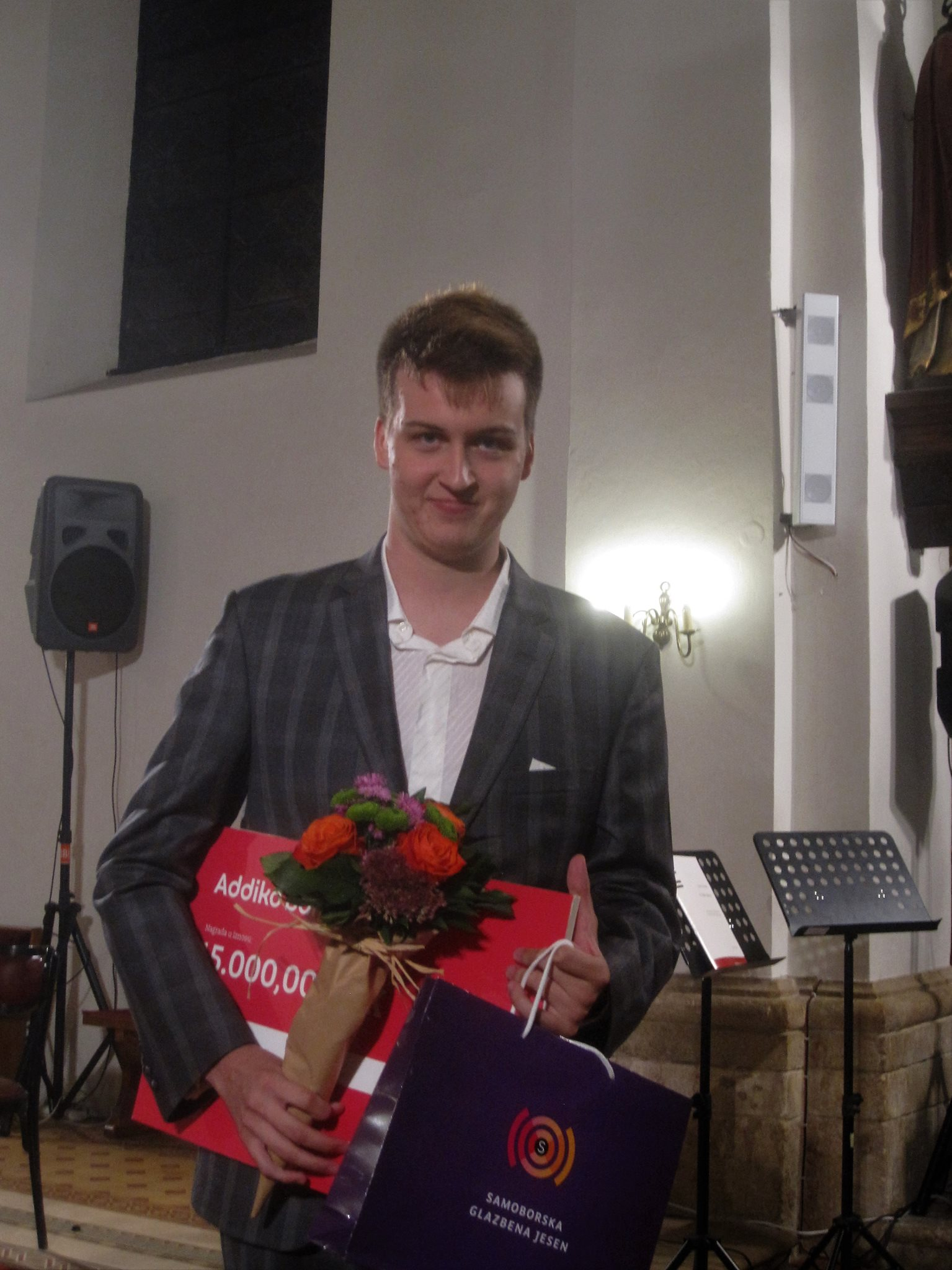
- Ivan Vihor in 2017

Background information
- Born: Ivan Vihor Krsnik Cohar; 22 January 1997 (age 29); Rijeka, Croatia
- Genres: classical music
- Occupation: pianist
- Instrument: Piano
- Website: www.ivanvihor.org
- Chess career
- Country: Croatia
- Title: FIDE Master (2015)
- Peak rating: 2362 (November 2024)

Ivan Vihor Krsnik Cohar (born 22 January 1997), known just as Ivan Vihor, is a Croatian classical pianist and chess player. He is the winner of the 2017 "Premio delle Arti", the most important Italian piano competition.

== Early life ==
Vihor was born on 22 January 1997 in Rijeka, Croatia. At the age of six, he started studying piano with professor Ana Drazul at the Ivan Matetic Ronjgov music school in Rijeka. He won his first piano competitions at a very early age (Rijeka State Competition and Istria and Kvarner Competition) and made his debut with orchestra at the age of 10, playing Bach Concerto in f minor BWV 1056 with Orchestra Sinfonica di Chioggia under the baton of conductor Pietro Perini.

== Career ==
After he completed his piano graduation exam with Honors, he enrolled in the Conservatory Gaetano Donizetti, Bergamo, into the class of Professor Marco Giovanetti with whom he completed his Bachelor of Music Degree and Master of Music Degree with the highest honors.

Vihor's numerous National and International Piano Competition Awards include the EPTA Piano Competition, Zlatko Grgosevic Zagreb, Major National Competition in Dubrovnik (2009, 2013), Festival Musica in Laguna Chioggia (2009, 2010, 2015.), "Daleki akordi" (2010.) etc.

During the 2014,2015 and 2016, Vihor participated in several competitions in Italy and won numerous prestigious awards such as "Premio Lino Barbisotti", "Rotary Scholarship for the Best Conservatory Student", "Bettinelli Competition Treviglio" and special prize for the youngest competitor in the finals of "Concorso pianistico Citta San Dona di Piave".

He has performed in concert throughout Europe including numerous prestigious halls such as the Historic Museum (Rijeka), "MD Vatroslav Lisinski" (Zagreb), Euphrasian Basilica (Poreč), Casa Natale di Gaetano Donizetti, Salone Riccardi di Teatro Donizetti, Auditorium Sant' Alessandro, Sala Piatti (Bergamo), Villa Tasso (Celadina), Auditorium San Niccolo (Chioggia), Grattacielo Pirelli (Milan – famous "Societa dei Concerti" Milano), Teatro Astrolabio Villasanta, Castello Visconteo Pagazzano, Castello Oldofredi Iseo etc. He has also performed in Slovenia, the Netherlands, the United States, Austria and France.

In May 2015, he recorded a CD with works of Schumann, Beethoven and Liszt. In July 2017 Ivan Vihor won First Prize in the most prestigious Italian piano competition "Premio Nazionale delle Arti". In October 2017, Ivan Vihor was named Croatia's best young musician, having won the Papandopulo competition and Livadic competition weeks earlier.

== Other interests ==
He also plays chess where he holds a title of FIDE master and frequently plays on Lichess, under the pseudonym "EddieMarsalla".

== Awards ==
- 2013 EPTA Piano Competition Osijek, Croatia – 2nd Prize
- 2015 Bettinelli Competition Treviglio, Italy – 4th Prize and Special Prize
- 2016 Lino Barbisotti Competition – 1st Prize and Absolute winner
- 2017 Premio nazionale delle Arti Pesaro, Italy – 1st Prize
- 2017 Papandopulo Competition Zagreb, Croatia – 1st Prize
- 2017 International Young musicians'competition "Ferdo Livadic" Samobor, Croatia – 1st Prize and Special Prize of the Croatian composers' Society
- 2018 Svetislav Stančić International Piano Competition Zagreb, Croatia – 3rd Prize
- 2018 International Piano Competition Massarosa, Italy – 3rd Prize
- 2019 Best Young Talent of the year (Premio giovane talento dell'anno) issued by The International Piano Festival of Brescia and Bergamo
- 2020 "Ivo Dražinić Award" issued by the Laus Academy and Dubrovnik Symphony Orchestra

== Discography ==
- 2015 – Schumann, Beethoven and Liszt, solo piano album (MC Harmony)
- 2020 – Contradanza, solo piano album (Vox Primus)
- 2021 – Liszt Transcriptions, solo piano album (Vox Primus)
