= Croatian Academy of Sciences and Arts =

Academy of sciences

- Hrvatska akademija znanosti i umjetnosti
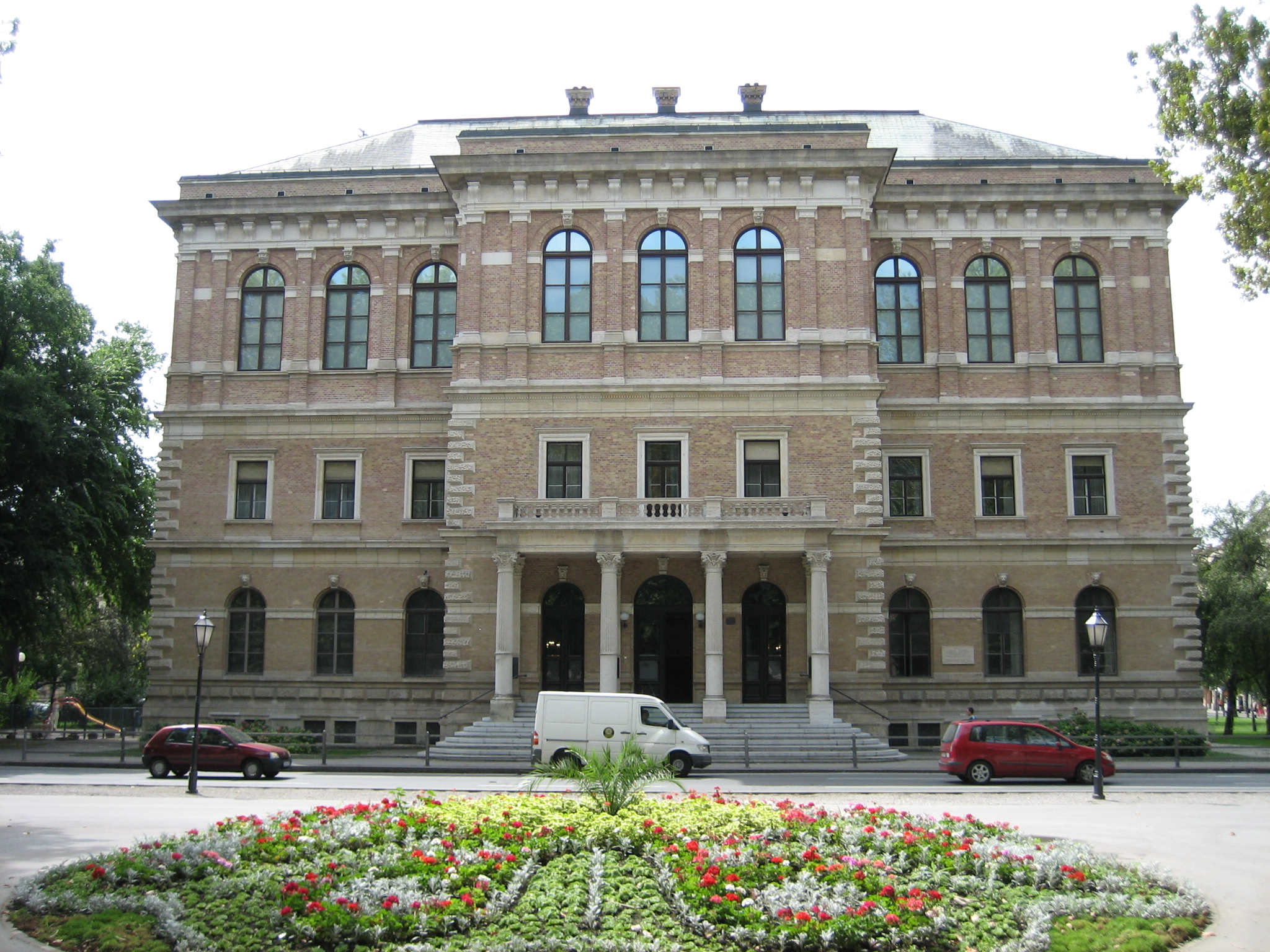
- View of the Academy Palace, Zrinski Square
- Abbreviation: HAZU
- Formation: 1866; 160 years ago
- Type: National academy
- Purpose: Science, arts, academics
- Headquarters: Trg Nikole Šubića Zrinskog 11, Zagreb, Croatia
- Location: 45°48′33″N 15°58′43″E
- Members: 134 full members (as of November 2020)
- Chairman: Davor Miličić
- Main organ: Presidency of the Academy
- Budget: €17,056,977 (2026)
- Website: www.info.hazu.hr

The Croatian Academy of Sciences and Arts (Latin: Academia Scientiarum et Artium Croatica; Croatian: Hrvatska akademija znanosti i umjetnosti, HAZU) is the national academy of Croatia, located in the centre of Zagreb. It operates under the Croatian Academy of Sciences and Arts Act.

HAZU was founded under the patronage of the Croatian bishop Josip Juraj Strossmayer under the name Yugoslav Academy of Sciences and Arts (Croatian: Jugoslavenska akademija znanosti i umjetnosti, JAZU) since its founder wanted to make it the central scientific and artistic institution of all South Slavs. Today, its main goals are encouraging and organizing scientific work, applying the achieved results, developing of artistic and cultural activities, carrying about the Croatian cultural heritage and its affirmation in the world, publishing the results of scientific research and artistic creativity and giving suggestions and opinions for the advancement of science and art in areas of particular importance to Croatia.

The academy is divided into nine classes; social sciences, mathematical, physical and chemical sciences, natural sciences, medical sciences, philological sciences, Literature, Fine Arts, Musical Arts and Musicology, technical sciences. The academy started in 1866 with 16 full members which grew to today's 160. Besides full, members can also be honorary, corresponding or associate.

== History ==
The institution was founded in Zagreb on 29 April 1861 by the decision of the Croatian Parliament (Sabor) as the Yugoslav Academy of Sciences and Arts. The bishop and benefactor Josip Juraj Strossmayer, a prominent advocate of higher education during the 19th century Croatian national romanticism, set up a trust fund for this purpose and in 1860 submitted a large donation to the then viceroy (ban) of Croatia Josip Šokčević for the cause of being able to

bring together the best minds [...] and find a way in which books in the national languages could be produced in the Slavic South; the Academy should also take under its aegis all the areas of human science

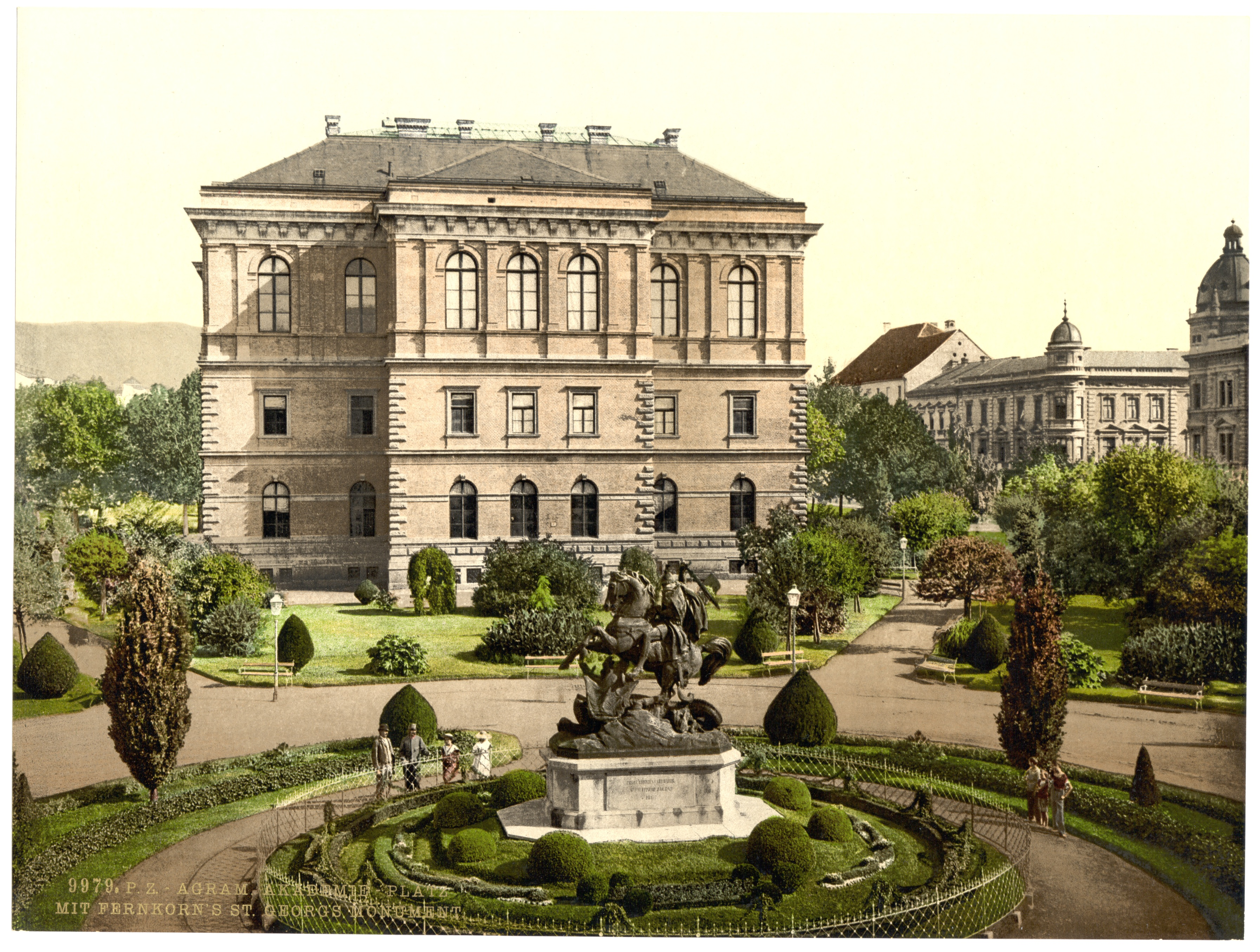
Academy Palace in the 1890s

After some years of deliberations by the Croatian Parliament and the emperor Franz Joseph, it was finally sanctioned by law in 1866. The official sponsor was Josip Juraj Strossmayer, while the first chairman of the academy was the distinguished Croatian historian Franjo Rački. Serbian linguist Đuro Daničić was elected secretary general of the academy, where he played a key role in preparing the academy's dictionary, the Croatian or Serbian Dictionary of JAZU.

The academy's creation was the logical extension of the University of Zagreb, the institution initially created in 1669 and also renewed by bishop Strossmayer in 1874. Bishop Strossmayer also initiated the building of the Academy Palace in the Zrinjevac park of Zagreb, and the Palace was completed in 1880. In 1884, the palace also became a host of the Strossmayer Gallery of Old Masters that contained 256 works of art (mostly paintings). The same is today one of the most prominent art galleries in Zagreb.

The academy started publishing the academic journal Rad in 1867. In 1882, each of the individual scientific classes of the academy started printing their own journals. In 1887, the academy published the first Ljetopis as a year book, as well as several other publications in history and ethnology.

Vatroslav Jagić, Baltazar Bogišić, Nikola Tesla, Mihailo Petrović, Dragutin Gorjanović-Kramberger, Andrija Mohorovičić, Ivan Meštrović, Lavoslav Ružička, Vladimir Prelog, Ivo Andrić, Miroslav Krleža, Ivan Supek and Franjo Tuđman were JAZU/HAZU members.

=== Name changes ===
The academy briefly changed name from "Yugoslav" to "Croatian" between 1941 and 1945 during the Independent State of Croatia.

It has again been renamed "Croatian" in 1991 after Croatia gained independence from Yugoslavia.

== Departments ==
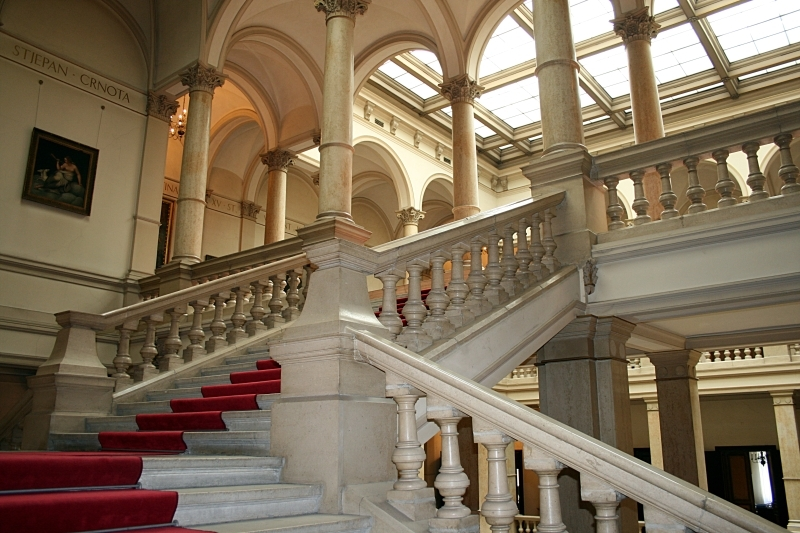
Interior of the Academy Palace

The academy is divided into nine departments (classes):

- Department of Social Sciences
- Department of Mathematical, Physical and Chemical Sciences
- Department of Natural Sciences
- Department of Medical Sciences
- Department of Philological Sciences
- Department of Literature
- Department of Fine Arts
- Department of Music and Musicology
- Department of Technical Sciences

=== The Institute for Historical Sciences ===
One of the research units of the academy is the Institute for Historical Sciences. It is located in a Renaissance villa in Dubrovnik, and holds a rich manuscript and library collection. Two peer-reviewed journals are published by the institute, which are fully available online: Anali in Croatian and Dubrovnik Annals in English.

=== The institute for Ornithology ===
The Institute for Ornithology houses the Croatian bird ringing scheme, and is a member of the European Union for Bird Ringing (EURING).

== Membership ==
There are four classes of members:

- Full members (redovni član)
- Associate members (pridruženi član)
- Honorary members (počasni član)
- Corresponding members (dopisni član)

The number of full members and corresponding members is limited to 160 each, while the maximum number of associate members is 100. Number of full members per department is limited to 24. Only the full members may carry the title of "academician" (English: F.C.A., Croatian: akademik (male member) or akademkinja (female member)).

== Chairmen ==
No.	Portrait	Chairman	Term
1		Franjo Rački	1866–1886
2		Pavao Muhić	1886–1890
3		Josip Torbar	1890–1900
4		Tadija Smičiklas	1900–1914
5		Tomislav Maretić	1914–1918
6		Vladimir Mažuranić	1918–1921
7		Gustav Janeček	1921–1924
8		Gavro Manojlović	1924–1933
9		Albert Bazala	1933–1941
10		Tomo Matić	1941–1946
11		Andrija Štampar	1946–1958
12		Grga Novak	1958–1978
13		Jakov Sirotković	1978–1991
14		Ivan Supek	1991–1997
15		Ivo Padovan	1997–2004
16		Milan Moguš	2004–2010
17		Zvonko Kusić	2010–2018
18		Velimir Neidhardt	2019–2026
19		Davor Miličić	2026–present

== Criticism ==
In the 2000s, the academy has been criticized to the effect that membership and activities are based on academic cronyism and political favor rather than on scientific and artistic merit. In 2006 matters came to a head with the academy's refusal to induct Dr. Miroslav Radman, an accomplished biologist, a member of the French Academy of Sciences, and an advocate of a higher degree of meritocracy and accountability in Croatian academia. His supporters within the academy and the media decried the decision as reinforcing a politically motivated, unproductive status quo.

Dr. Ivo Banac, a Yale University professor and then a deputy in the Croatian parliament, addressed the chamber in a speech decrying a "dictatorship of mediocrity" in the academy, while Globus columnist Boris Dežulović satirized the institution as an "academy of stupidity and obedience". Dr. Vladimir Paar and others defended the academy's decision, averring that it did take pains to include accomplished scientists but that, since Dr. Radman's work has mostly taken place outside Croatia, it was appropriate that he remain a corresponding rather than a full member of the academy.

Nenad Ban, a distinguished molecular biologist from ETH Zurich and a member of the German Academy of Sciences Leopoldina is only a corresponding member of HAZU. Ivan Đikić, a molecular biologist working at the Goethe University Frankfurt, and also a member of Leopoldina since 2010, has not been able to join HAZU even as a corresponding member, despite being the most cited Croatian scientist, with more citations than the academy's 18-member Department of Medical Sciences combined.

From 2005 to 2007, the Department of Philological Sciences at the academy released several declarations on the linguistic situation in Croatia, which were criticised by Snježana Kordić for being nationalistically motivated rather than linguistically based. Despite pressure from members of the Department of Philological Sciences, one journal refused to stop publishing criticism.

In May 2022, the academy published a document outlining conditions for Bosnia and Herzegovina's entry into the European Union, calling for a third Croat entity to be implemented in the country due to the rising challenges faced by Croats from "Serbian secessionist and Bosniak unitarist" policies. It also proposed conditions to be fulfilled by Serbia and Montenegro before they joined the EU. It has been criticized by analysts for its ethno-nationalist and political nature and has drawn comparisons to the controversial SANU memorandum.

== Miscelaneous ==
In 2023 the museum restituted to the heirs of Dane Reichsmann artworks that had been looted, including André Derain's “Still Life With a Bottle” and Maurice de Vlaminck's “Landscape by the Water”, as well as lithographs by Pablo Picasso, Pierre-Auguste Renoir, Paul Cézanne and Pierre Bonnard.

== See also ==
- Matica hrvatska
