= Republic of Croatia Square =

City square in Zagreb, Croatia

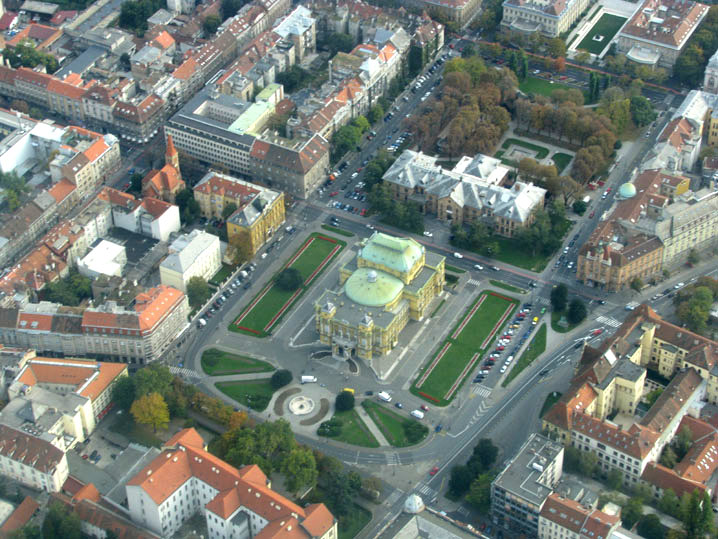
- Aerial view of Republic of Croatia Square
- Interactive map of Republic of Croatia Square
- Native name: Trg Republike Hrvatske (Croatian)
- Former name: See list
- Location: Donji grad, Zagreb, Croatia
- Coordinates: 45°48′34″N 15°58′12″E

Republic of Croatia Square (Croatian: Trg Republike Hrvatske) is one of the biggest squares in Zagreb, Croatia. The square is located in Lower Town, with the Croatian National Theatre building at its centre. It is sometimes billed as the "most beautiful square in Zagreb".

The present-day square was formed in the period between 1856 (when the former hospital was built on its northern side) and 1964 (when the Ferimport building was erected on the western side). However, the majority of buildings overlooking the square were built in the late 19th century in the historicist style of architecture.

Republic of Croatia Square was the first in line of three squares which form the west wing of the so-called Lenuci's horseshoe (Croatian: Lenucijeva potkova), a U-shaped belt of squares and parks designed by engineer Milan Lenuci in the late 19th century which frames the core part of Zagreb's city centre. The east wing of the belt is formed by the King Tomislav, Strossmayer and Zrinski squares, and the west wing by the Marulić, Mažuranić and Republic of Croatia squares, with the Botanical Garden connecting the two. The square is home to several cultural and educational institutions and several landmark sculptures.

== Timeline ==
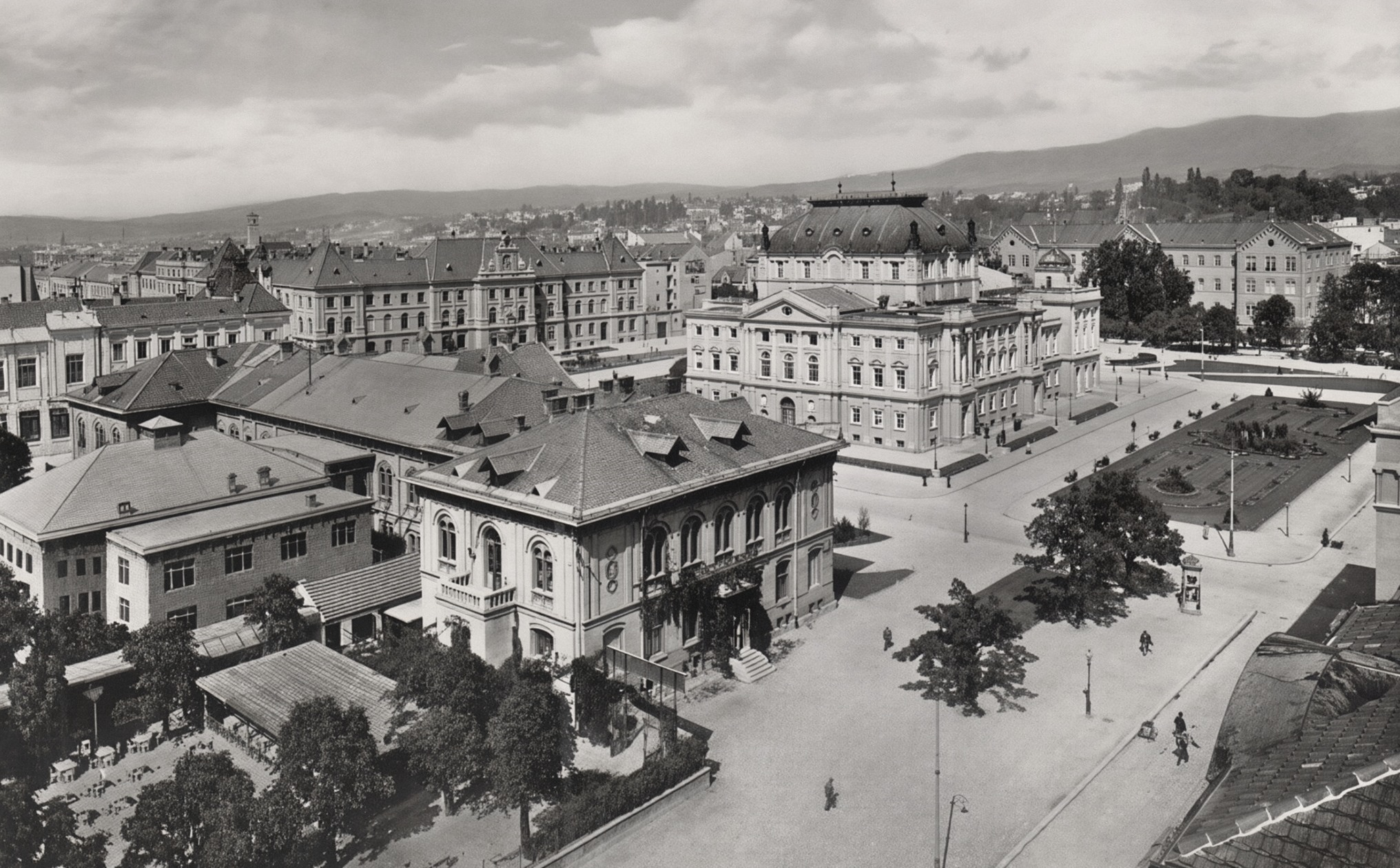
Aerial view of the Trg kralja Aleksandra I. (King Alexander I Square), 1930s

- 1855–1856 - The square begins to take shape with the first building constructed on its northern side, a hospital ran by Daughters of Charity. From 1868 to 1882 the building housed a tobacco factory, and when the factory was moved out in 1882 it was taken over by the University of Zagreb. Today it houses the Zagreb Faculty of Law and the university rectorate. It was designed by architect Ludwig von Zettl.
- 1864 - The area of the present-day square is used as a fair ground for the first trade fair held in Croatia, the First Dalmatian-Croatian-Slavonian Trade Exhibition (Croatian: Prva dalmatinsko-hrvatska-slavonska gospodarska izložba), which was opened by ban Josip Šokčević and attended by more than 3,000 companies from throughout Croatia and the Austrian Empire.
- 1874 - The building which today houses the Školska knjiga publishing company is built on the eastern side. Designed by Janko Jambrišak, it went through several renovations and modifications since then.
- 1876–1878 - A two-story house designed by Franjo Klein is built on the eastern side, originally as the headquarters of the Croatian chamber of commerce (Hrvatsko gospodarsko društvo). In 1922 a third floor was added; today it is part of the Faculty of Law.
- 1884 - The southern side of the square is closed, through the construction of the building which housed the Sokol gymnastics society and the Kolo folklore group. A revised design by architect Matija Antolec was used for the building. The west wing was added during the construction of the Croatian National Theatre 11 years later, which was originally used for storing theatre props (today it houses a spare ballet hall, art workshops and heating systems for the theatre building). In 1969 the west wing was connected to the theatre via a tunnel. The rest of the building today houses the Academy of Dramatic Art.
- 1888 - The building housing the School of Crafts (Obrtna škola, today the School of Applied Arts and Design) and the Museum of Arts and Crafts is built on the western side, designed by architect Hermann Bollé.
- 1889 - Eastern side takes its final form with the building of the Teacher's Association (Učiteljski dom, today the Croatian School Museum), designed by Leo Hönigsberg of the Hönigsberg & Deutsch architecture studio.
- 1891 - A two-story building built on the northwest corner, designed by Kuno Waidmann (today home of the Miroslav Krleža Lexicographical Institute).
- 1895 - The new building of the Croatian National Theatre designed by Fellner & Helmer opens (the theatre moves here from its old location in the Old City Hall in Gradec). The inauguration is attended by Emperor Franz Joseph and marked by a student protest who burned the Hungarian flag at Ban Jelačić Square (as the theatre was built during the reign of ban Károly Khuen-Héderváry and the project was seen as part of his Magyarization policies).
- 1899 - A two-story house built on the eastern side, designed by Martin Pilar. In 1922 the building was reconstructed and a third floor and a mansard roof were added, based on the designs by Oton Goldscheider. Today it houses the Kazališna kavana (English: Theatre Cafe).
- 1903 - Secessionist-style building erected on the southwest corner, designed by Vjekoslav Bastl for Hönigsberg & Deutsch
- 1911–1912 - The northern part of the square undergoes redecoration, designed by Ignjat Fischer. Obelisk-shaped candelabra which were built in front of the National Theatre moved to the Mirogoj cemetery and Ivan Meštrović's sculpture Well of Life was installed in its place.
- 1913 - East of the Kolo building, Frank House was erected, designed by Viktor Kovačić in the Renaissance Revival style
- 1964 - The Željpoh building (later known as Ferimport building) built on the western side of the square, designed by Stanko Fabris.
- 2014 - Željpoh building demolished in 2009, the new building of the Zagreb Academy of Music was built on its location, and opened in September 2014.
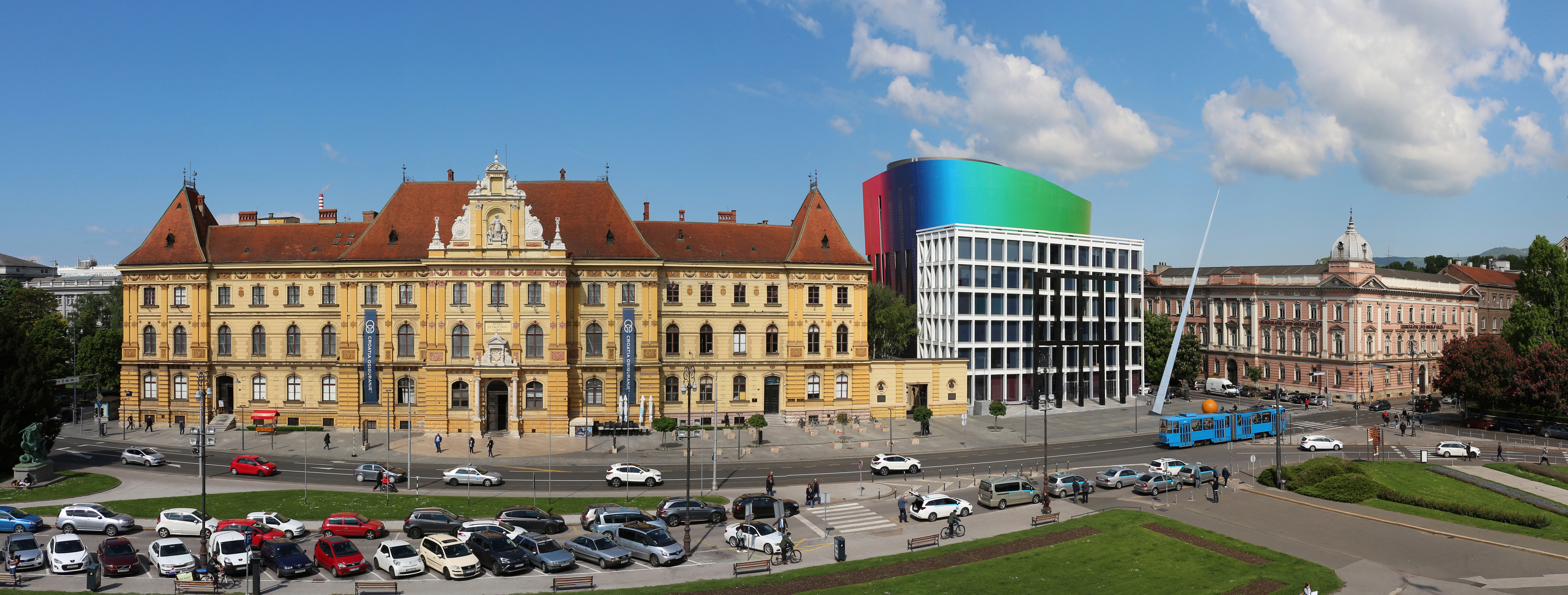
Right to left; Museum of Arts and Crafts, Music Academy and Miroslav Krleža Institute of Lexicography, seen from Croatian National Theatre

== Sculptures ==
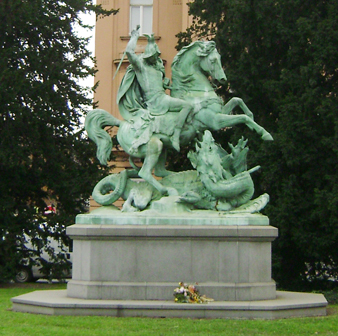
St. George Killing the Dragon by Anton Dominik Fernkorn

- St. George Killing the Dragon by Anton Dominik Fernkorn located in the southwest corner; made in 1853 in Vienna, the sculpture was bought and brought to Zagreb by Juraj Haulik in 1867, when it was placed at the entrance of Maksimir Park. In 1884 it was handed over to the City of Zagreb and then moved first to Strossmayer square before being moved again and installed at its current location in 1907.
- Well of Life, designed by sculptor Ivan Meštrović in front of the Croatian National Theatre building; created in 1905 and installed in 1912.
- History of Croats by Ivan Meštrović, in front of the Faculty of Law; created in 1932.
- Monument to Đuro Deželić (1838-1907), writer and politician and founder of firefighting in Croatia, on the west side of the square, in front of the Ferimport building; designed by sculptor Frane Cota and commissioned by the Croatian Firefighting Association, the monument was erected in 1937.

== Former names ==
Being one of the most prominent squares in Zagreb its name was often changed in accordance to political circumstances of the time. The last change happened in 2017, as citizens' groups were lobbying for another name change on the grounds that Josip Broz Tito is a negative historical personality, due to his involvement in the many deaths during the rule of his communist regime. The following is a complete list of names the square carried throughout its history.

- 1878–1888 Sajmišni trg (Fairground Square)
- 1888–1919 Sveučilišni trg (University Square)
- 1919–1927 Wilsonov trg (Woodrow Wilson Square)
- 1927–1941 Trg kralja Aleksandra I. (King Alexander I Square)
- 1941–1945 Trg I. (Square No. 1)
- 1945–1946 Kazališni trg (Theatre Square)
- 1946–2017 Trg maršala Tita (Marshal Tito Square)
- 2017–present Trg Republike Hrvatske (Republic of Croatia Square)

=== Name change controversy ===
In February 2008 about 2000 protesters, dressed in red aprons, gathered at the Marshal Tito Square, as it was known at the time, demanding the square to be renamed Theatre Square. Some 200 supporters of Marshal Tito also assembled at the opposite end of the square. The police prevented the two groups from coming in contact with each other. Zagreb's Mayor Milan Bandić said that there is no historic reason to change the name of the square. However, in June, 2017, the same mayor stated that he would suggest the square to be renamed and that the new name would be the Republic of Croatia Square. The Square was officially renamed by the City of Zagreb Assembly, and adopted its new name on 1 September 2017.

== Gallery ==
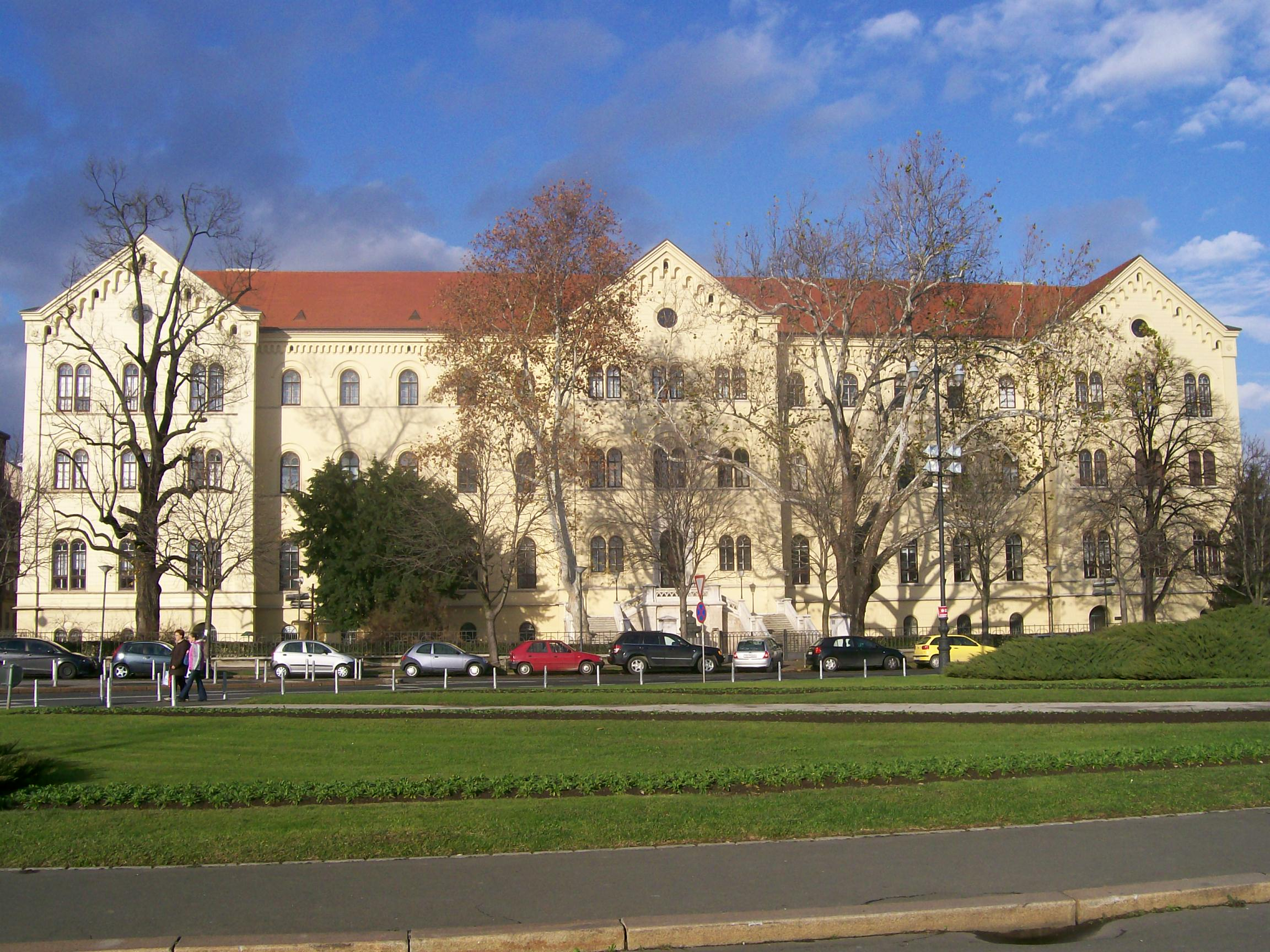
Faculty of Law, University of Zagreb

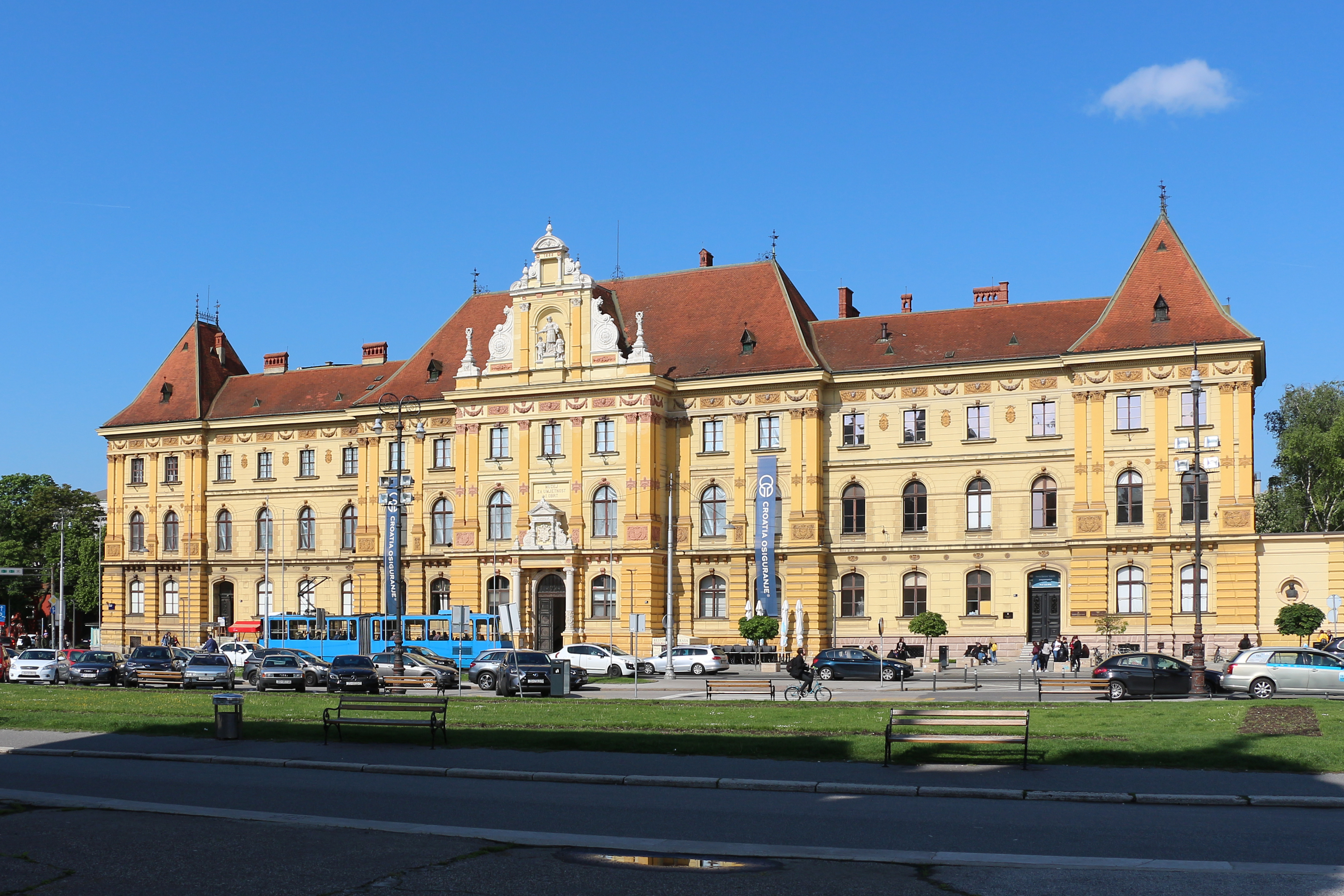
Museum of Arts and Crafts

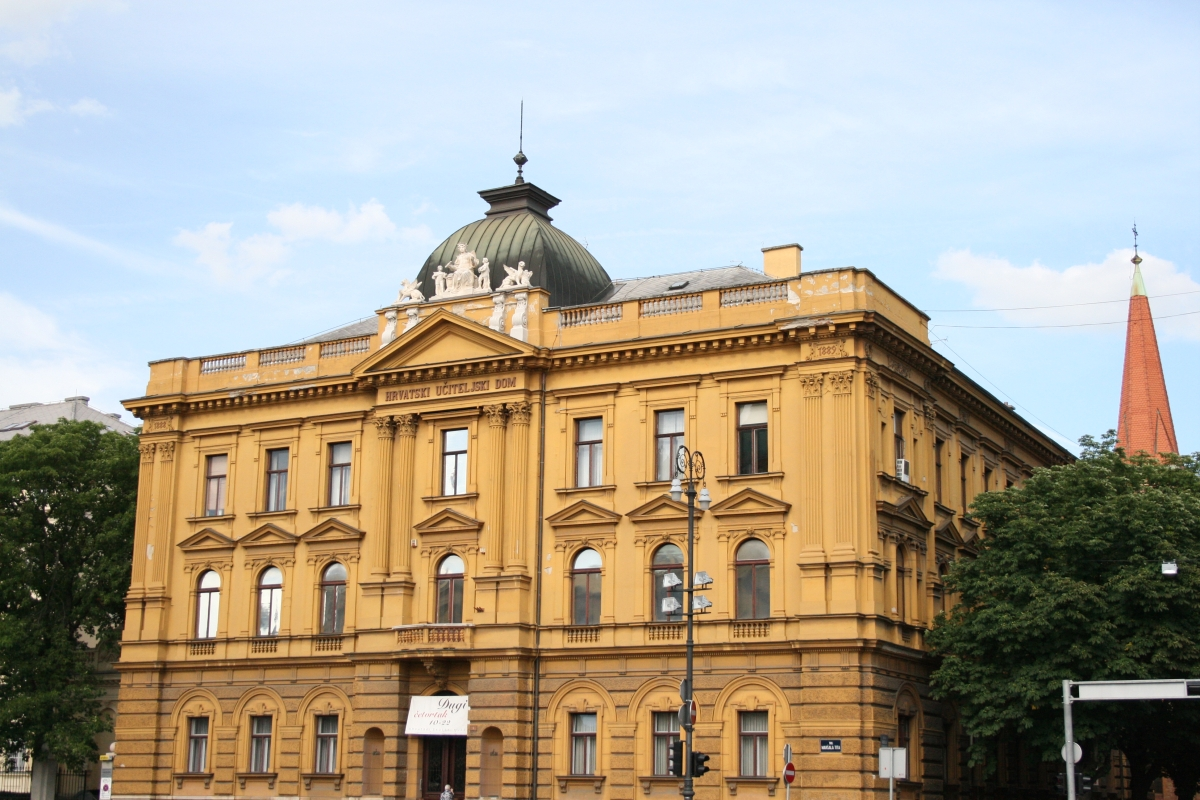
Croatian School Museum

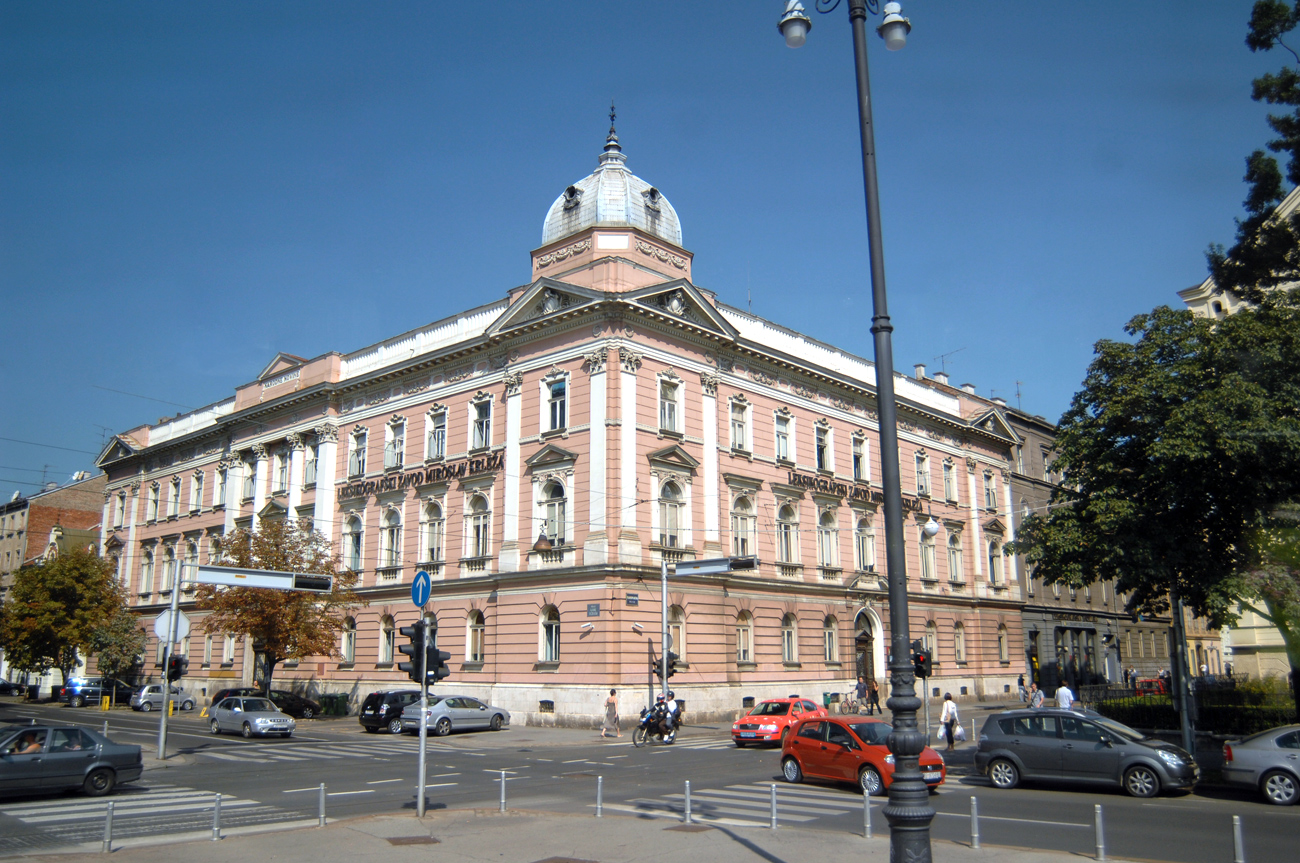
Miroslav Krleža Lexicographical Institute

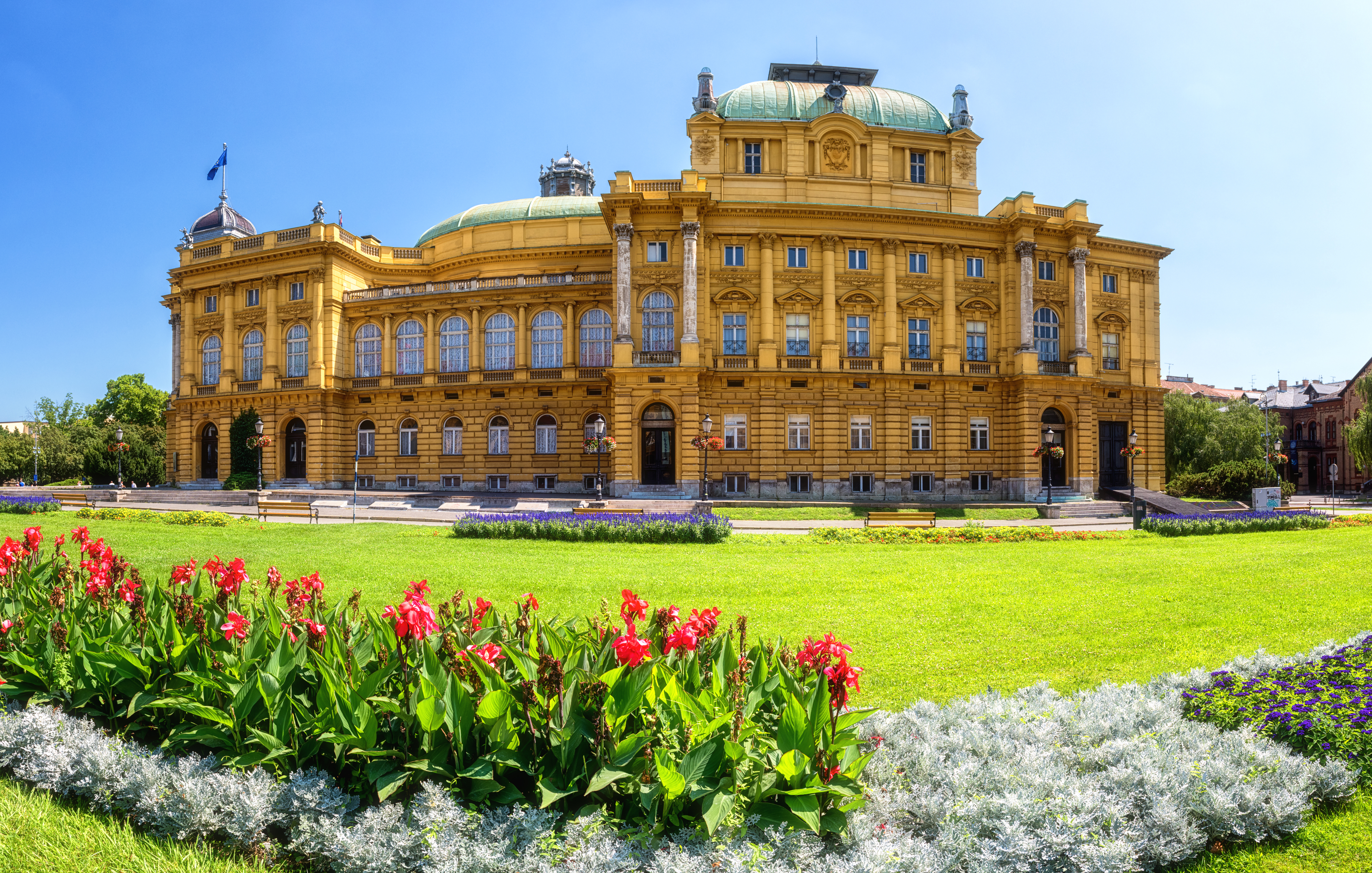
Croatian National Theatre

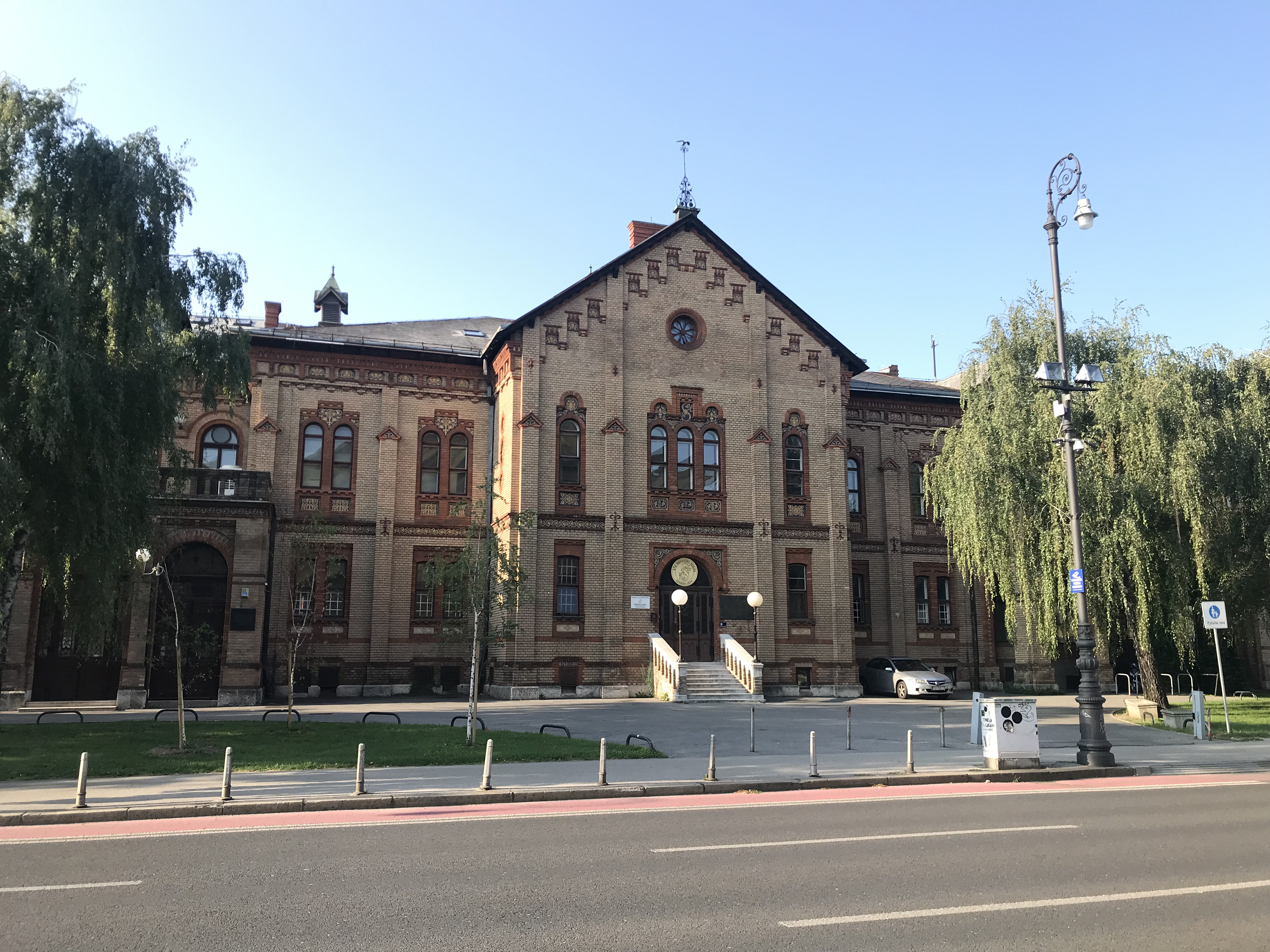
Academy of Dramatic Art

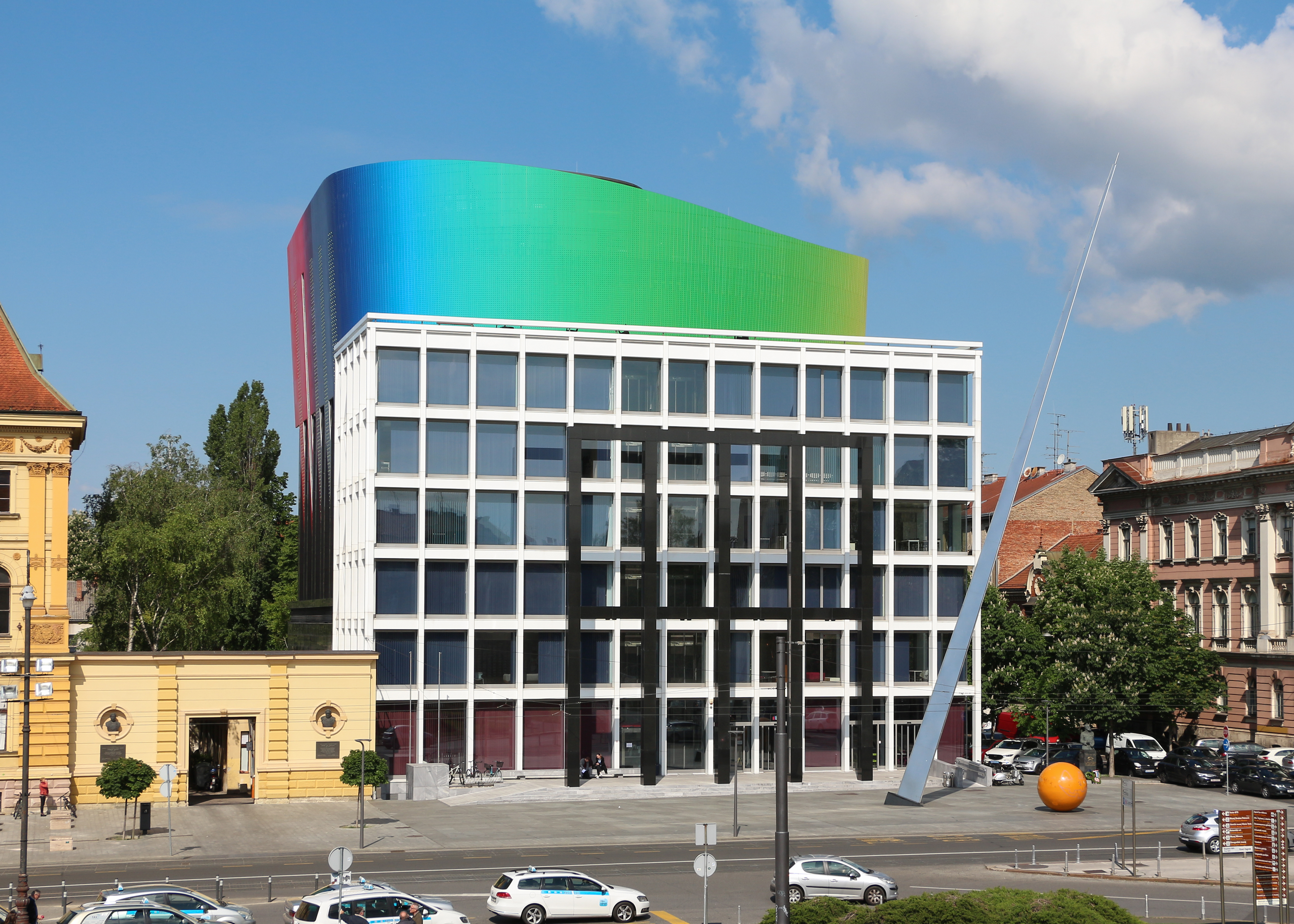
Zagreb Academy of Music

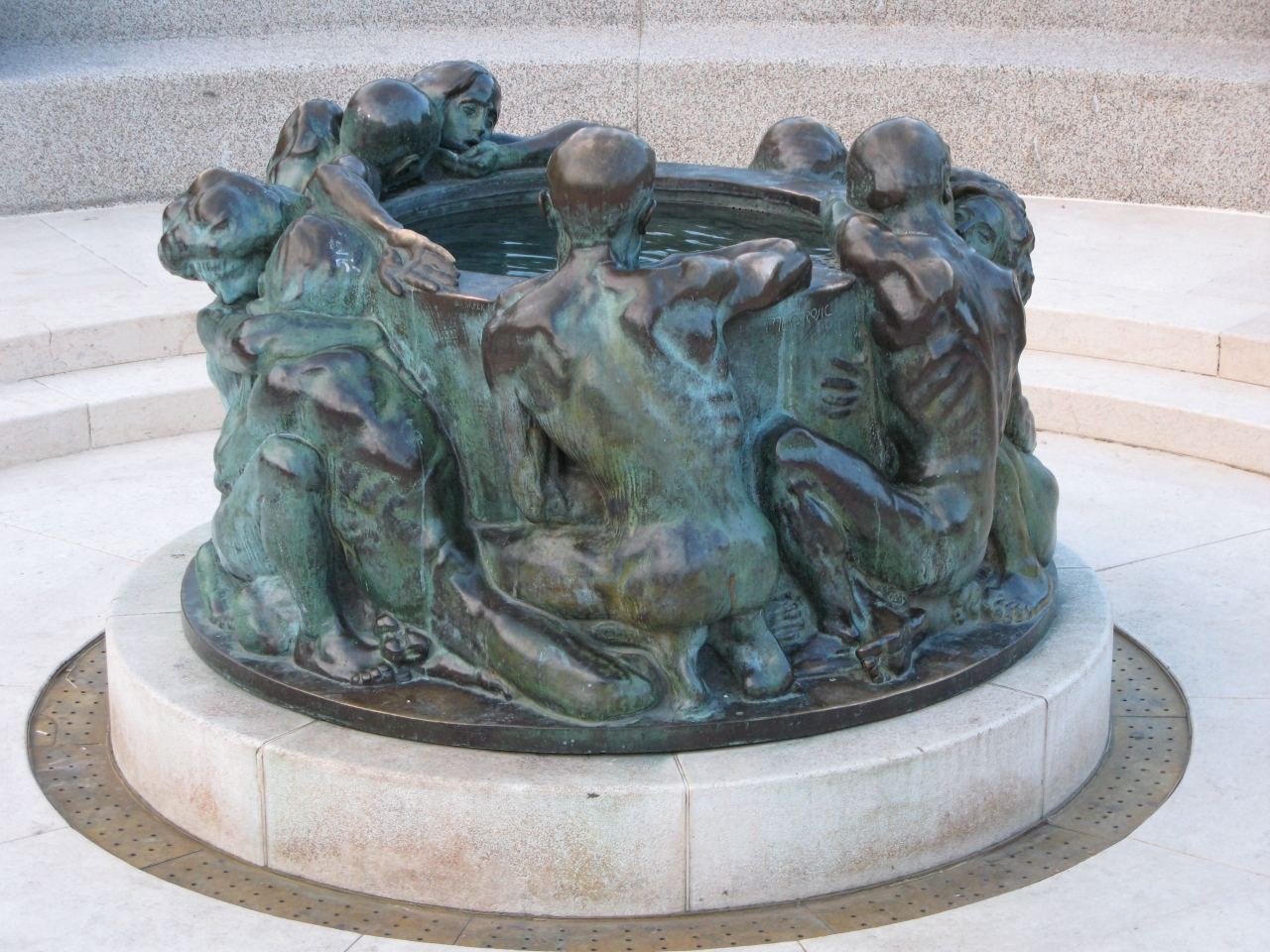
Well of Life by sculptor Ivan Meštrović
