= Lenuci Horseshoe =

Group of city squares and parks in Zagreb, Croatia

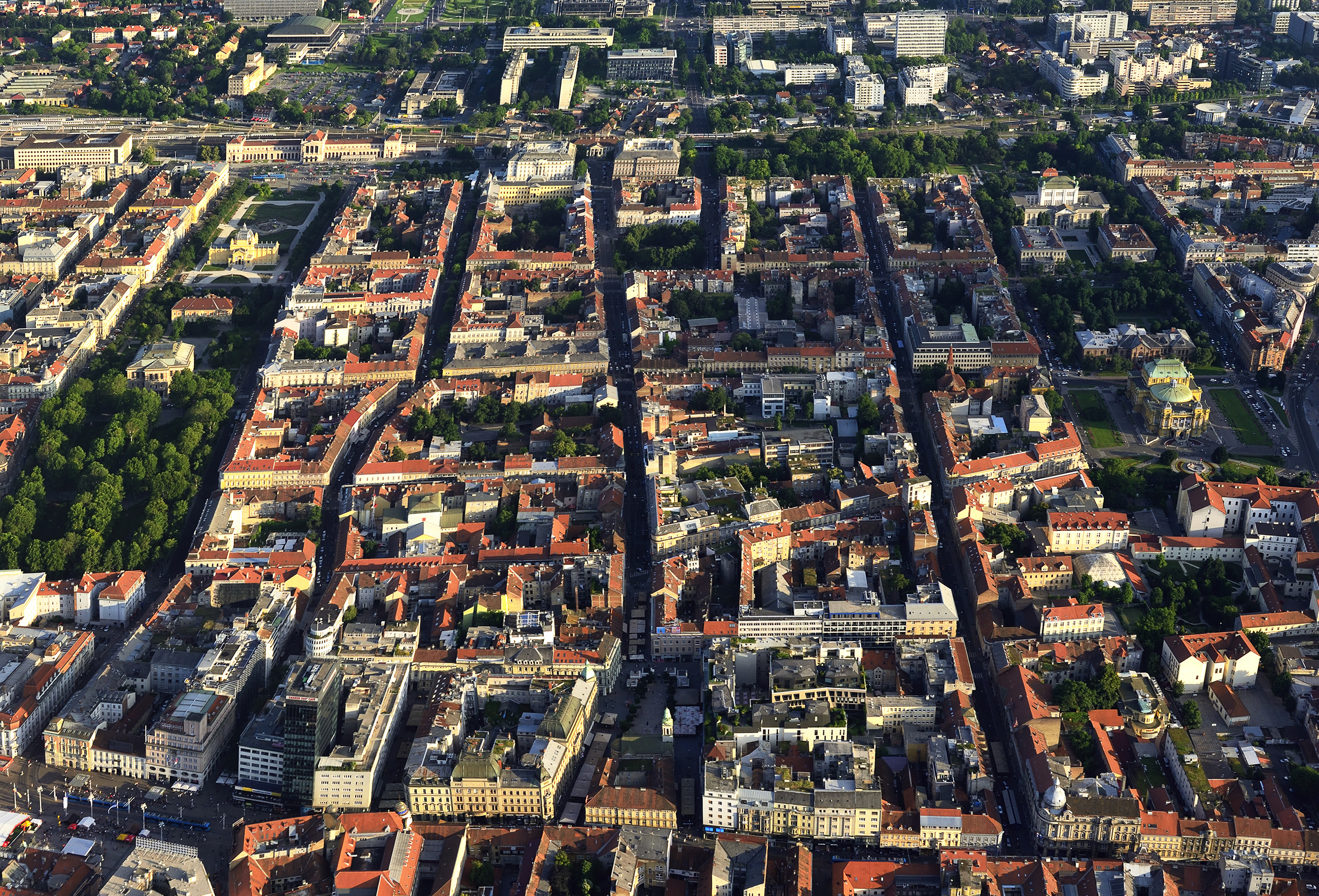
- Aerial north view of Zelena potkova
- Interactive map of Lenuci Horseshoe

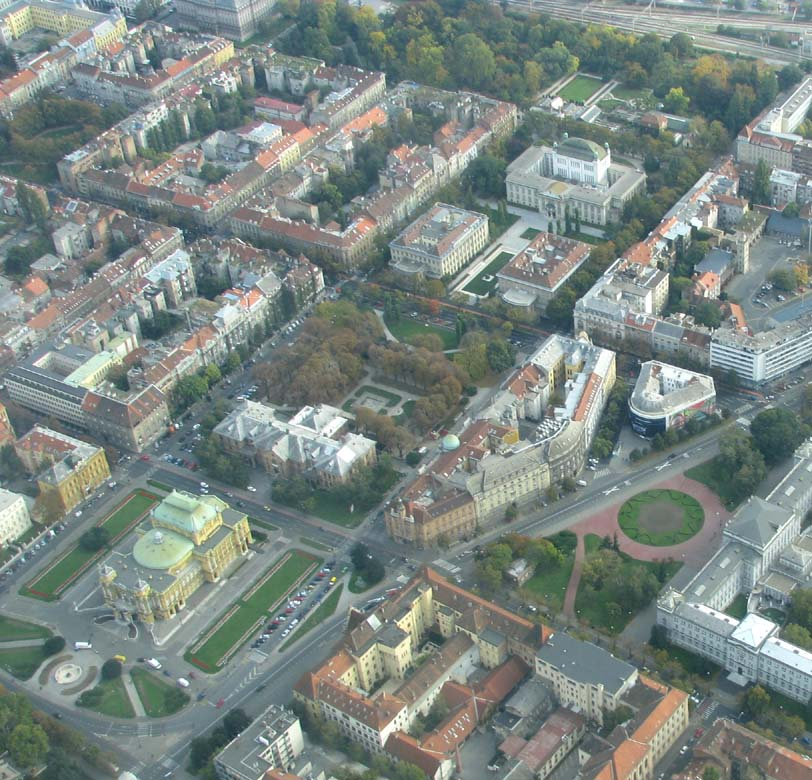
Western and southern side of the Lenuci Horseshoe viewed from northwest

The Lenuci Horseshoe or the Green Horseshoe (Croatian: Lenucijeva potkova, Zelena potkova; "Lenuci" is also sometimes spelled "Lenuzzi") is a U-shaped system of city squares with parks in downtown (Donji grad) Zagreb, Croatia. The horseshoe was conceived in 1882 by Croatian urbanist Milan Lenuci. The parks were designed between 1883 and 1887, at a time when today's Donji grad formed the southern outskirts of Zagreb.

The construction was helped by the efforts to rebuild the city after the 1880 Zagreb earthquake, and in 1889 the entire horseshoe was finished—its two ends were connected by the newly built Zagreb Botanical Garden. The park system consists of seven squares aligned on three straight lines.

== Description ==
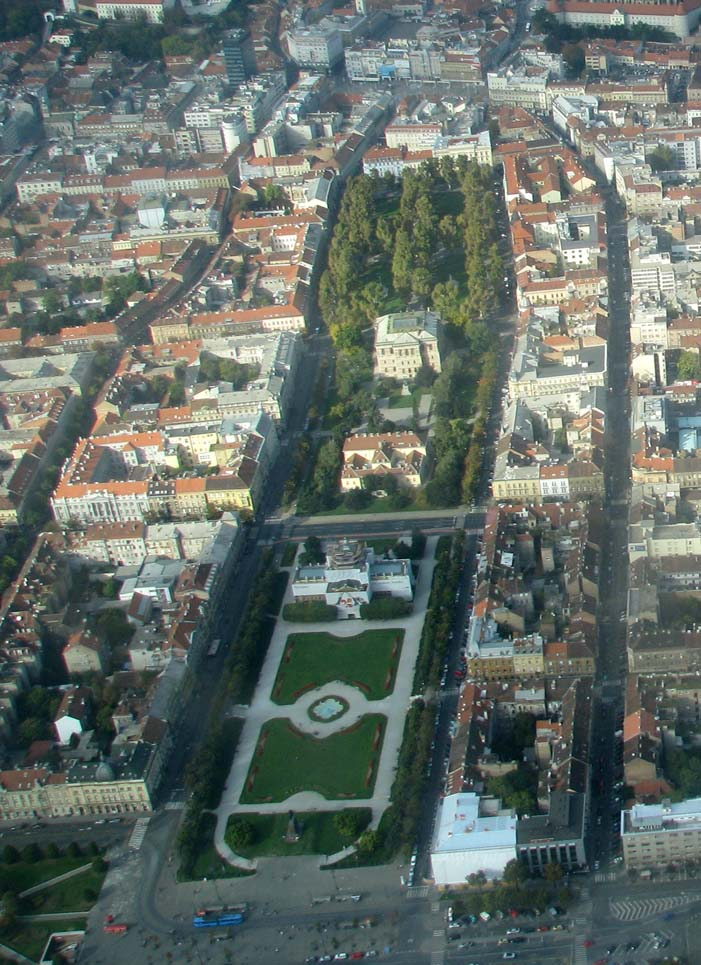
East side

The squares comprising the horseshoe are arranged in three straight lines on Donji grad's grid plan, forming the west, south and east side of the horseshoe. Starting from northeast and going clockwise, the horseshoe is formed by Nikola Šubić Zrinski Square (locally known as Zrinjevac), Josip Juraj Strossmayer Square, King Tomislav Square, Ante Starčević Square, Lenuci fitness park, Zagreb Botanical Garden, Marko Marulić Square, Ivan Mažuranić Square and Republic of Croatia Square.

The horseshoe is home to the headquarters of many organizations and institutions in Zagreb, as well as several museums: Archaeological Museum, Modern Gallery, Art Pavilion, Croatian State Archives, Ethnographic Museum and Museum of Arts and Crafts. The greenery is interrupted between Ante Starčević Square and the Lenuci fitness park. The Esplanade Zagreb Hotel is located there. The south side of the horseshoe lies next to the Zagreb Glavni kolodvor, the city's main railway station. Republic of Croatia Square is home to the Croatian National Theatre, while Nikola Šubić Zrinski Square houses the buildings of the Croatian Academy of Sciences and Arts.

== History ==
The oldest part of the horseshoe is Nikola Šubić Zrinski Square. It was formed in 1826 under the name Novi terg ("New Square") as a new home for the livestock marketplace formerly held on today's Ban Jelačić Square. In the 1860s, it was decided that the square would be re-purposed as park, and throughout the following decades the marketplace and the fairs were gradually moved to the area of today's Republic of Croatia Square, on the western end of the horseshoe-to-be, which was entitled Sajmište ("Old Trade Fair"). Toward the end of the century, many new palaces in the neo-Renaissance style were built on Zrinski Square. The square was also decorated by busts of numerous famous Croats, as well as the Meteorological Pole in 1884 and a music pavilion in 1891. The palace of the Croatian Academy of Sciences and Arts (then Yugoslav Academy of Sciences and Arts) was built on the southern edge of Zrinski Square, inside then-new Academic Square (Croatian: Akademički trg, today Josip Juraj Strossmayer Square).

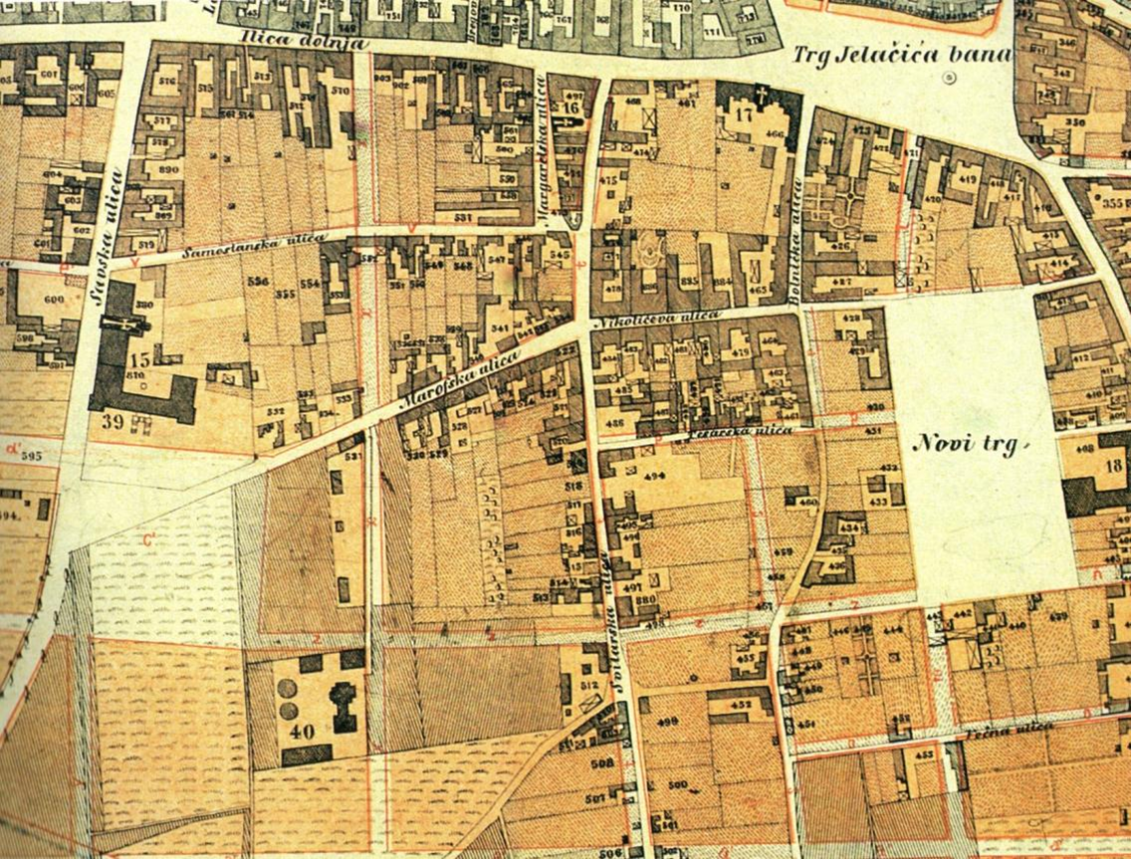
1865 map of downtown Zagreb. Future Zrinski Square is visible on the east, while Republic of Croatia Square is on the west side

In 1880, a devastating earthquake hit Zagreb. The idea of a horseshoe-shaped system of connected parks in central Zagreb was first presented in 1882, as part of a plan to modernise Sajmište. It included two north–south axes of greenery corresponding to the west and east side of the Lenuci Horseshoe, which were called "Western Parkway" and "Eastern Parkway" (Croatian: Zapadni perivoj, Istočni perivoj) In 1887, a new urban plan was adopted, including a rectangular grid plan for today's Donji grad and incorporating the parkways. The two axes were connected in 1889 by the newly opened Zagreb Botanical Garden and the "Southern Parkway" (Croatian: Južni perivoj), today Ante Starčević Square. The marketplace on the western end of the new horseshoe was moved further out of the city in 1890. Sajmište was modernised, receiving a new name: University Square (Croatian: Sveučilišni trg). The Croatian National Theatre, located in the center of the square, was opened in 1895, in time for Emperor Franz Joseph's visit.

In June 2013, a fitness park was opened in Grgur Ninski Street, between the Zagreb Botanical Garden and Esplanade Hotel. On 27 September of the same year, Lenuci Horseshoe received a special award on Entente Florale, while the city of Zagreb received a silver award.
