= Academy of Dramatic Art, University of Zagreb =

Drama school of the University of Zagreb

Academy of Dramatic Art
- Akademija dramske umjetnosti (ADU)
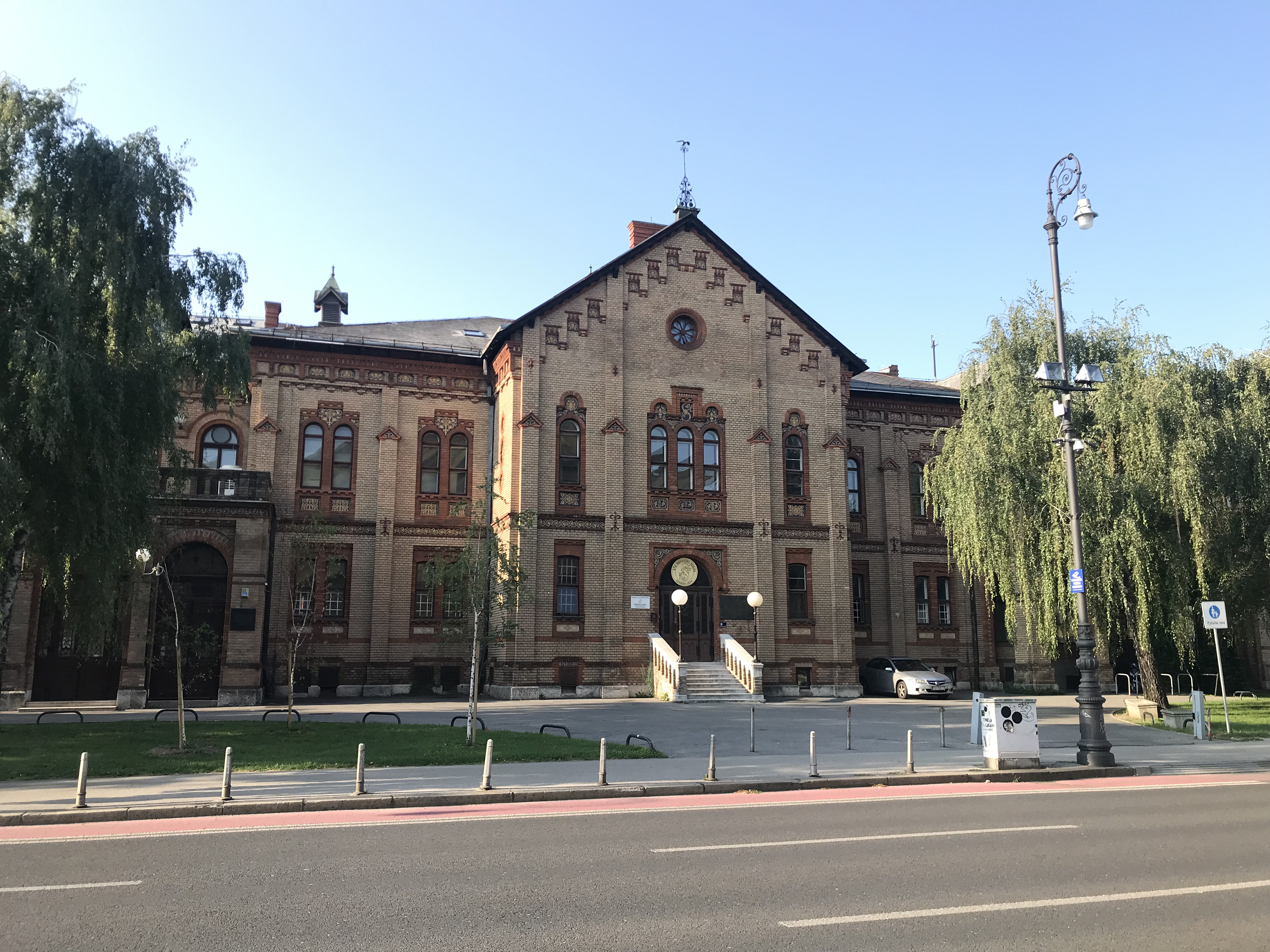
- Type: Public
- Established: 1896
- Dean: Davor Švaić
- Location: Zagreb, Croatia; 45°48′31″N 15°58′12″E
- Website: adu.hr

The Academy of Dramatic Art (Croatian: Akademija dramske umjetnosti or ADU) is a Croatian drama school. Since its inception in 1896, the institution grew in prominence resulting in its successful affiliation with the University of Zagreb in 1979, along with the Academy of Music and the Academy of Fine Arts. The Academy serves as the country's premier drama school, providing education for all types of professions related to theatre, television and film production, including actors, directors, cinematographers, playwrights, screenwriters, dramaturgs and editors.

== History ==
The need for an academy of drama in Zagreb was first mentioned in the Croatian parliament's 1861 piece of theatre legislation which stipulated that a "school for theatre personnel should be formed in Zagreb". However, the modern-day academy traces its roots to the Croatian Drama School (Hrvatska dramatska škola) which was established by Stjepan Miletić in 1896, more than 30 years after the 1861 law. The school was housed in a building at Republic of Croatia Square, which it occupies today.

During its history the school was renamed and reformed several times. Up until mid-20th century, its primary role was vocational training of theatre actors. Later, departments for film and television were added. In November 1950, the school was legally recognized as a higher education institution, mainly through the efforts of Branko Gavella, Drago Ivanišević and Ranko Marinković, prompting a rename to "academy". In 1979, it officially became part of the University of Zagreb.

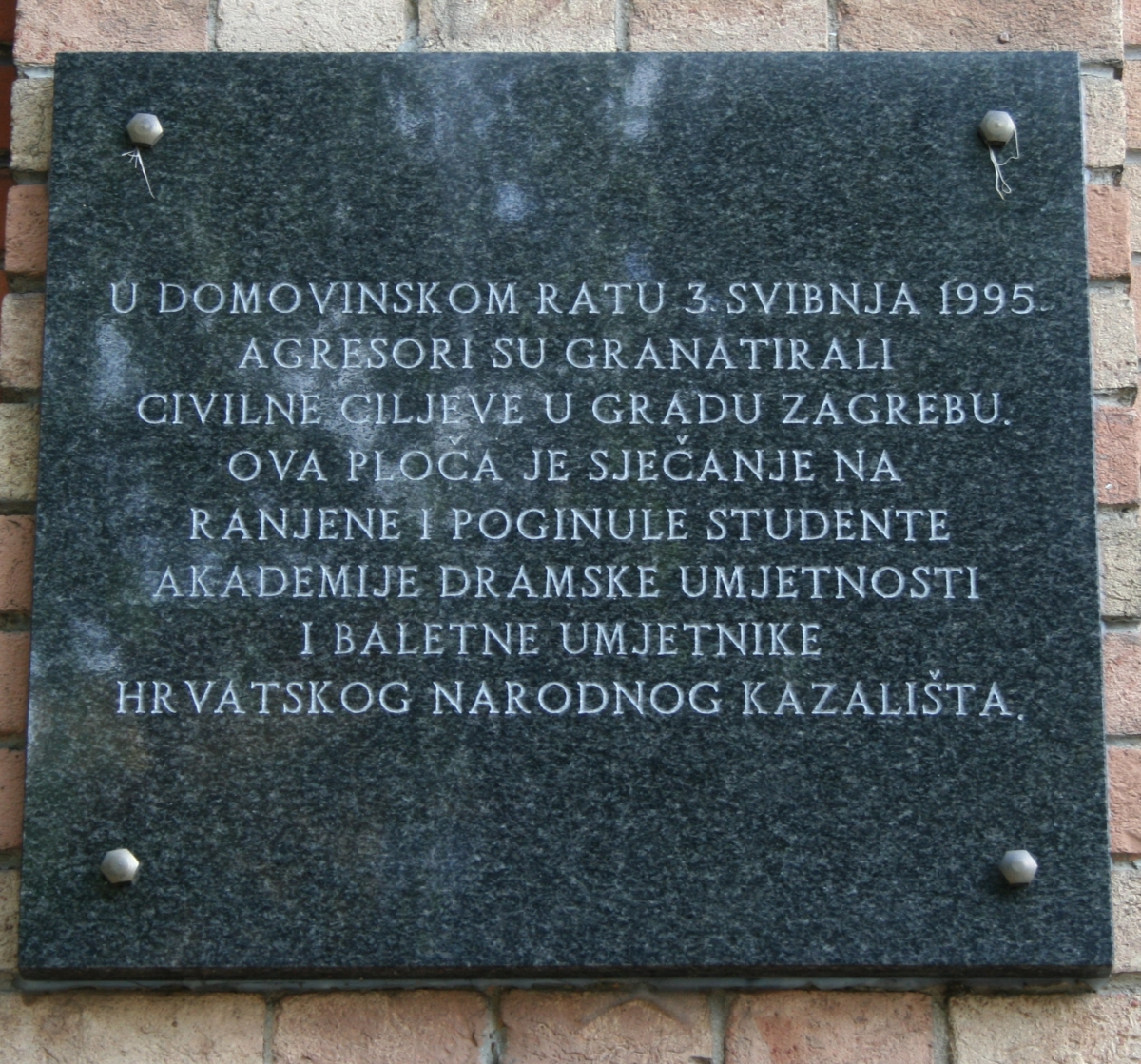
Plaque commemorating the attack on the Academy

During the Croatian War of Independence, in the Zagreb rocket attacks on 3 May 1995, the Academy's building was hit by cluster bombs fired on Zagreb's city centre (Donji grad). The dean's office and the dramaturgy department offices were badly damaged in the attack and two employees and four students were wounded, including Luka Skračić, a first-year student of film directing, who later died. In memory of this event, the Academy officially proclaimed 3 May as Academy Day and a plaque commemorating the attack was unveiled on its 10th anniversary in 2005.

In the period between 1950 and 1994 a total of 574 students have graduated from the Academy's departments. The Academy is also member of various international associations such as CILECT (Centre International de Liaison des Ecoles de Cinéma et de Télévision), IIRT (Instituto Internationale per la Ricerca Teatrale), IFIRT (International Federation for Theatre Research) and ELIA (European League of Institutes of the Arts).

== Organisation ==
As of 2010 the academy has eight departments:

- Acting department
- Theatre and radio directing department
- Film and television directing department
- Cinematography department
- Dramaturgy department
- Production department
- Film editing department
- Dance department

== Rectors and Deans ==
Between 1950 and 1979 the head of the Academy was titled "Rector" (Rektor) as it had been an independent learning institution. In 1979 it became part of the University of Zagreb and since then its head holds the title of "Dean" (Dekan).

- 1950–1954 — Josip Škavić
- 1954–1962 — Branko Gavella
- 1962–1970 — Kosta Spaić
- 1970–1972 — Bratoljub Klaić
- 1972–1976 — Izet Hajdarhodžić
- 1976–1980 — Vladan Švacov
- 1980–1982 — Nikola Batušić
- 1982–1984 — Tomislav Radić
- 1984–1986 — Joško Juvančić
- 1986–1988 — Nikola Batušić
- 1988–1992 Enes Midžić
- 1992 — Vlatko Pavletić
- 1992–1996 — Enes Midžić
- 1996–2000 — Maja Rodica-Virag
- 2000–2004 — Vjeran Zuppa
- 2004–2008 — Branko Ivanda
- 2008–2012 — Enes Midžić
- 2012–2016 — Borna Baletić
- 2016–2021 — Franka Perković-Gamulin
- 2021–present — Davor Švaić

== See also ==
- University of Zagreb
- Zagreb Academy of Fine Arts
- Zagreb Academy of Music
- Sibila Petlevski
