= Gavella =

Gavella may refer to:

- Branko Gavella (1885–1962), Croatian theatre director
- Gavella Drama Theatre (Croatian: Dramsko kazalište Gavella), theatre house in Zagreb, Croatia, established in 1953
- Gavella House, historic building in Zagreb located on Ban Jelačić Square built in 1889 and designed by Kuno Waidmann
