= Zrinjevac =

Zrinjevac may mean:

- Zrinjevac (Zagreb), a park formally known as the Nikola Šubić Zrinski Square in Zagreb, Croatia
- Zrinjevac (Mostar), a central park in Mostar, Bosnia and Herzegovina
- Zrinjevac (Osijek), a park in Osijek, Croatia
