= Klaić =

Klaić is a Croatian surname. Notable people with the surname include:

- Bratoljub Klaić (1909–1983), Croatian linguist and writer
- Miho Klaić (1829–1896), Croatian politician
- Miro Klaić (born 1976), footballer from Bosnia and Herzegovina
- Nada Klaić (1920–1988), Croatian historian
- Šimo Klaić (1929–2010), Croatian sculptor
- Vjekoslav Klaić (1849–1928), Croatian historian and writer

== See also ==
- Joseph Kleitsch (1882–1931), US painter born in the Banat
