= Faculty of Law, University of Zagreb =

Law school of the University of Zagreb

Faculty of Law of the University of Zagreb
- Pravni fakultet Sveučilišta u Zagrebu
- Type: Public
- Established: 4 November 1776; 249 years ago
- Affiliations: University of Zagreb
- Rector: Stjepan Lakušić
- Dean: Ivan Koprić
- Students: 6230 (2013)
- Location: Republic of Croatia Square 14, Zagreb, Croatia
- Website: pravo.hr

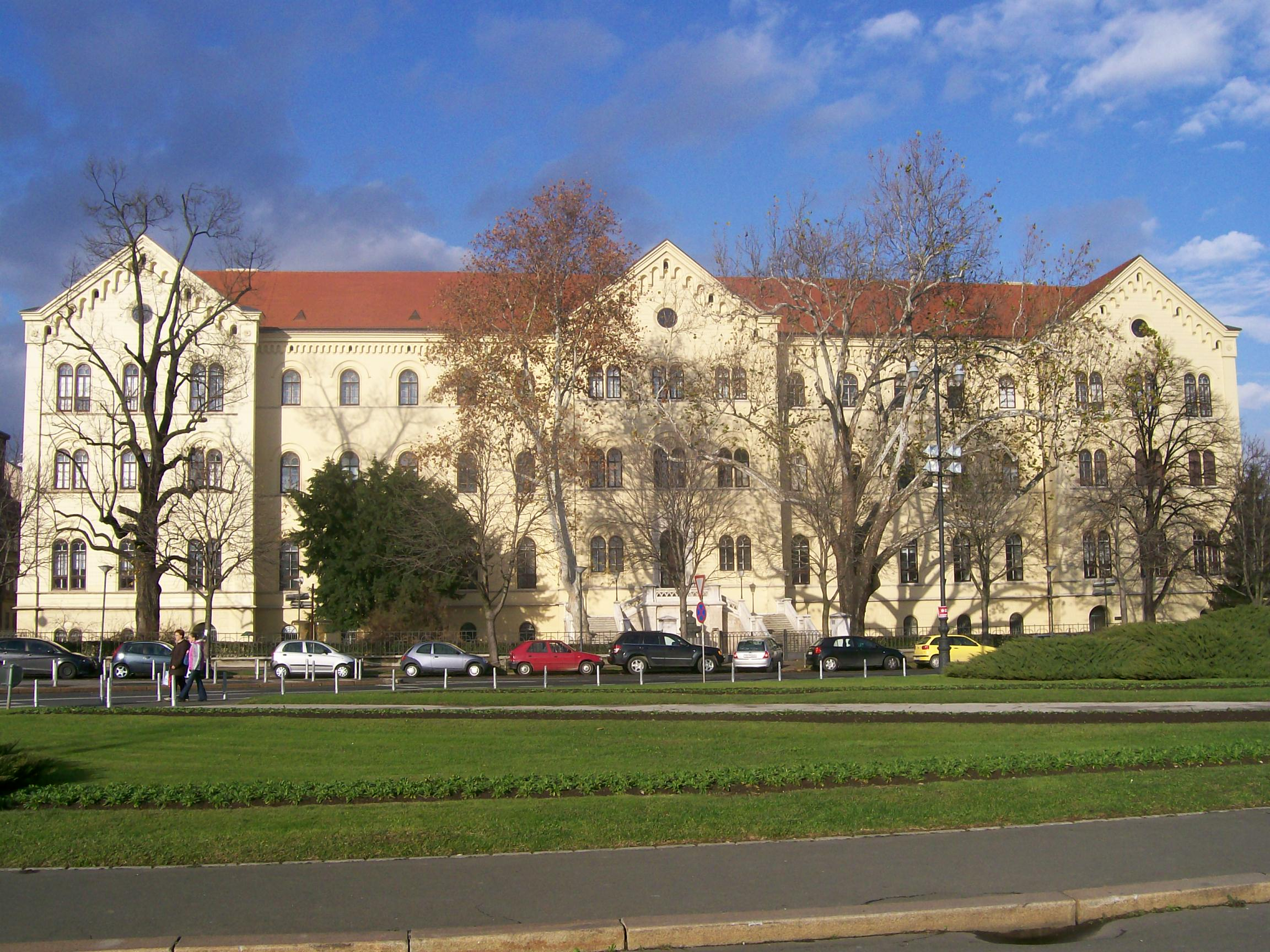
Seat of the Faculty of Law at the Republic of Croatia Square

The Faculty of Law of the University of Zagreb (Croatian: Pravni fakultet Sveučilišta u Zagrebu, Latin: Universitas Studiorum Zagrabiensis, Facultas Iuridica, PFZG) is the law school of the University of Zagreb. Founded in 1776 by Empress Maria Theresa as part of her comprehensive reforms in the system of education in the Habsburg monarchy, it is the oldest continually-operating law school in Croatia and all of Southeast Europe. Zagreb Faculty of Law offers BA, MA, and Ph.D degrees in law, social work, social policy, public administration, and taxation.

== History ==
After the dissolution of the Society of Jesus, Empress Maria Theresa took the sweeping reforms in the educational system of the Habsburg Monarchy. In 1776 she issued a decree establishing the Royal Academy of Sciences (lat. Regia Scientiarum Acaemia) as the highest educational institution in Kingdoms of Croatia and Slavonia. The Academy consisted of faculties of Philosophy, Theology, and Law with former including political-cameral studies for the education of the Croatian administrative personnel which was founded in 1769 in Varaždin, the former Croatian capital.

At the first formal meeting of the Royal Academy, it was determined that classes would begin on November 4, 1776. The first teachers were selected on the basis of public tenders. Empress personally confirmed the selection. At the time, the Faculty had four departments: canon law (ius canonicum), general international public law (ius gentium et ius publicum universale), civil and law theory (Institutiones iuris civilis iuris et Patria teheoretici) and political-cameral sciences (politia qui accesserit studios cameralia quoque ac aeconomica). Classes were held mainly in Latin.

The school system in the Monarchy was reorganized in 1850. Zagreb Academy was abolished, while the Faculty of Law was renamed into the Royal Academy of Legal Science (Regia academia iuris), which thus became the only institution of higher education in Croatia until 1874. Since 1850, classes were held in Croatian. On 19 October 1874, the Royal University of Franz Joseph I (now University of Zagreb) was officially opened. The university consisted of three faculties; Theology, Philosophy, Legal and Administrative Sciences. All lectures were held in Croatian. Faculty worked under the name Royal Academy of Legal Science (Kraljevska akademija pravnih znanosti) until 1926 when it was renamed to its present name - Faculty of Law of the University of Zagreb (Pravni fakultet Sveučilišta u Zagrebu).

In the period between the two world wars, Faculty managed to retain its identity and attribute of the leading in the country despite many difficulties. The Faculty of Law merged with the College of Administration in 1968 and in 1983 the College of Administration and Interfaculty Studies for Social Workers. This resulted in the organization of the two-year administrative studies for administrative lawyers and the four-year social studies for social workers. Tax study was introduced in the year 1996.

Education programs at the university lasted for three years until 1868 when they were extended to four. With the introduction of the Bologna process in 2005 integrated study for a graduate lawyer was extended to five years. In its first 75 years, the Faculty of Law had cca. 2,000 students. Between 1850 and 1874, the Academy of Legal Science enrolled about 70 students annually, a total of about 1700. Today, there are more than 6000 students which makes the Faculty the second largest in the country, after Zagreb Faculty of Economics and Business.

== Studies ==
Programs performed at the Faculty are:
Faculty of Law:

- Integrated BA-MA general law graduate program
- Ph.D. in law science (with specialization in: civil and family law, corporate and commercial law, international public and private law, criminal science, fiscal systems and fiscal policy, public law and public administration, and European law)

Department of Social Work:

- BA and MA graduate program for social workers
- MA graduate program in social policy
- Ph.D. in social policy, psychosocial approach in social work, supervision of psycho-social work, and family mediation

Department of Public Administration and Public Finance:

- BA and MA graduate program of public administration
- BA graduate program of taxation

== Chairs ==
- Chair of General Theory of Law and State
- Chair of Roman private law
- Chair of General History of Law and State
- Chair of History of the Croatian law and state
- Chair of Sociology
- Chair of Political Economy
- Chair of Constitutional Law
- Chair of Criminal Law
- Chair of European Public Law
- Chair of Family Law
- Chair of Economic Policy
- Chair of Legal Informatics
- Chair of Civil Law
- Chair of Administrative Science
- Chair of International Law
- Chair of Financial Law and Financial Science
- Chair of Criminal Procedural Law
- Chair of Labour and Social Law
- Chair of Administrative Law
- Chair of Commercial Law and Corporate Law
- Chair of Civil Procedural Law
- Chair of Maritime and Transport Law
- Chair of Private International Law
- Chair of Foreign Languages

As part of the Department for Social Welfare there are 5 chairs:

- Chair of Psychology
- Chair of Theory and Methodology of Social Work
- Chair of Special Areas of Social Work
- Chair of Social Policy
- Chair of Gerontology
