= Academy of Music, University of Zagreb =

Music school in Zagreb, Croatia

Academy of Music
- Muzička akademija (MUZA)
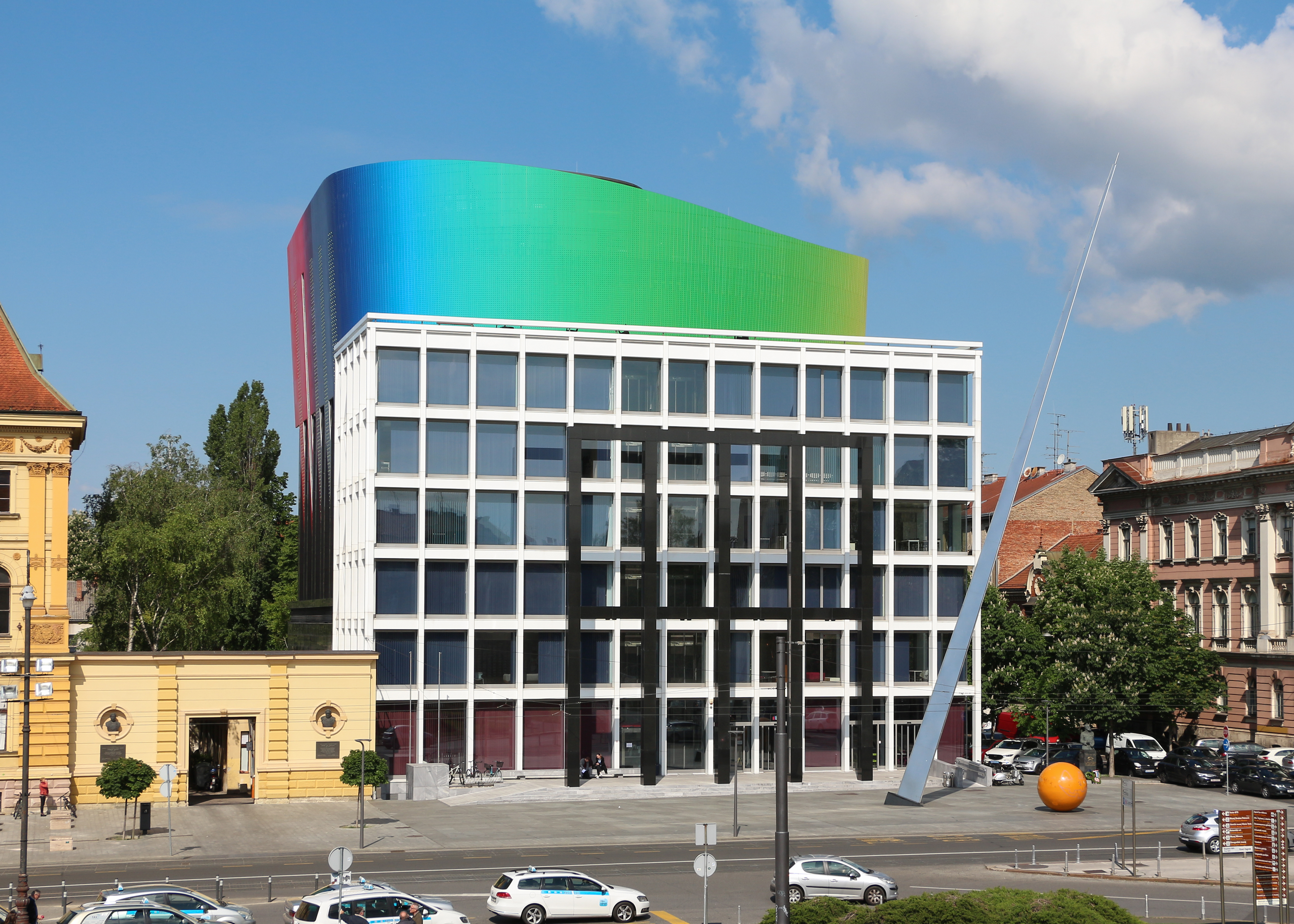
- Academy new building
- Type: Public
- Established: 1829; 197 years ago as Zagreb Musical Society's school 1921 (re-established)
- Dean: Igor Lešnik
- Faculty: 150
- Students: 500
- Location: Zagreb, Croatia; 45°48′37″N 15°58′06″E
- Website: www.muza.unizg.hr

The Academy of Music (Croatian: Muzička akademija or MUZA) is a Croatian music school based in Zagreb. It is one of the three art academies affiliated with the University of Zagreb, along with the Academy of Dramatic Art and the Academy of Fine Arts.

It is the oldest and largest music school in the country, tracing its origins back to 1829 when the Zagreb Musical Society's school (German: Tonschule des Agramer Musikvereines) was established, at a time when Croatia was part of the Austrian Empire. After World War II the Academy was officially recognized as an institution of higher education and in 1979 it became part of the University of Zagreb. The Academy today has around 500 students and a 150-member teaching staff.

The Academy traditionally organizes two grand concerts every year held at the Vatroslav Lisinski Concert Hall, along with almost 300 various smaller concerts throughout the year held at smaller venues around Zagreb.

== History ==
The Academy traces its roots to the in-house music school established in February 1829 by the German-language Agramer Musikverein (or Zagreb Musical Society) modeled after the Musikverein in Vienna and which later evolved into the present-day Croatian Music Institute. The school originally offered three-year courses in singing and wind instruments.

The school became the Institute's conservatory in 1916. In the late 18th and early 19th centuries the school continued to grow and was renamed several times. Following the dissolution of Austria-Hungary in 1918 and the establishment of the Kingdom of Yugoslavia it became the "Royal Conservatory" in 1921 (Kraljevski konzervatorij) and then the "Royal Academy of Music" (Kraljevska muzička akademija) in 1922. At the time the school comprised primary, secondary and tertiary levels of musical education. In 1923 its teachers first gained the title of professors and the Academy was re-organized into five main departments. In 1940 the Academy was officially recognized as a university-level faculty.

After World War II in 1951 the school is broken up into the primary and secondary music school (the present-day Vatroslav Lisinski School of Music) and the university-level academy named Zagreb Academy of Music (Muzička akademija u Zagrebu), which originally had seven departments. In 1967 the Academy established its Musicology Institute which later grew into an additional department in 1974, and five years later the Academy was incorporated into the University of Zagreb in 1979. The Academy is the only Croatian member of the European Association of Conservatoires (AEC), the main European association of colleges and university schools of music.

== Location ==
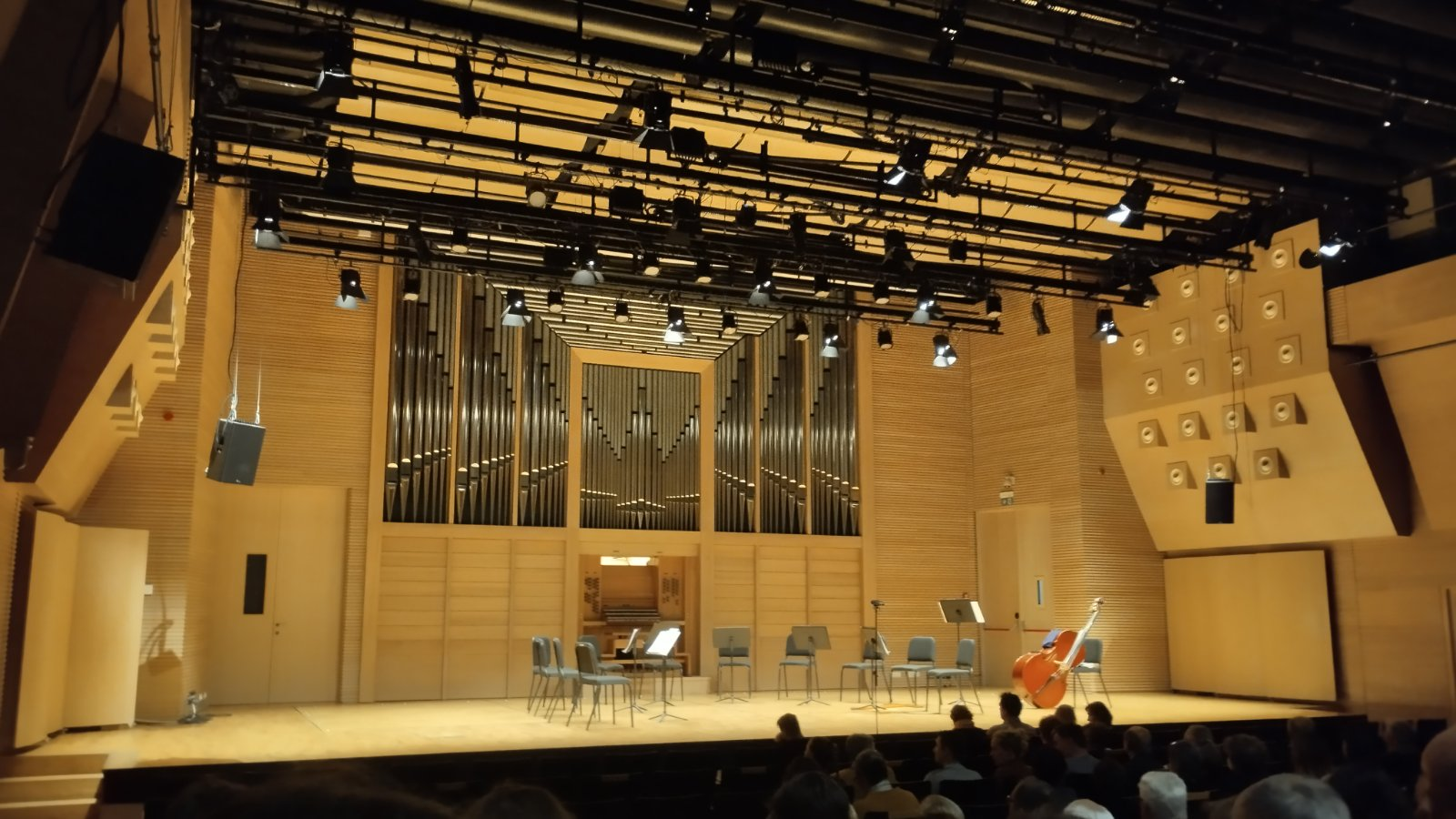
Blagoje Bersa Concert Hall inside the academy building.

The Academy currently occupies the reconstructed Ferimport building at Republic of Croatia Square which was completed in September 2014, following delays which pushed its completion date by three years from the originally planned date of 2011. The Academy had signed a 100-year lease contract with the City of Zagreb in 2009, which also agreed to provide half of the HRK 210 million (€27.5 million) funding spent to restore the building (with the other half provided by the University of Zagreb and the Croatian Ministry of Science, Education and Sports). The restored building occupies some 12.000 square meters spread over three underground and eight ground levels, and hosts 7 departments of the Academy with its 150 full-time employees, several dozen contractors and 550 students. The Academy also operates a regional department in Rijeka which offers courses in singing and piano.

== Organisation ==
=== Departments ===
As of 2010 the academy has eight departments:

- Musical composition and music theory department (Odsjek za kompoziciju i teoriju glazbe)
- Musicology department (Odsjek za muzikologiju)
- Conducting, harp and percussion instruments department (Odsjek za dirigiranje, harfu i udaraljke)
- Singing department (Odsjek za pjevanje)
- Piano, harpsichord and organ department (Odsjek za klavir, čembalo i orgulje)
- String instruments and guitar department (Odsjek za gudačke instrumente i gitaru)
- Wind instruments department (Odsjek za duhačke instrumente)
- Music education department (Odsjek za glazbenu pedagogiju)

== See also ==
- University of Zagreb
- Croatian Music Institute
- Academy of Dramatic Art Zagreb
- Academy of Fine Arts Zagreb
