= Museum of Arts and Crafts, Zagreb =

Art museum in Zagreb, Croatia

Museum of Arts and Crafts
- Muzej za umjetnost i obrt
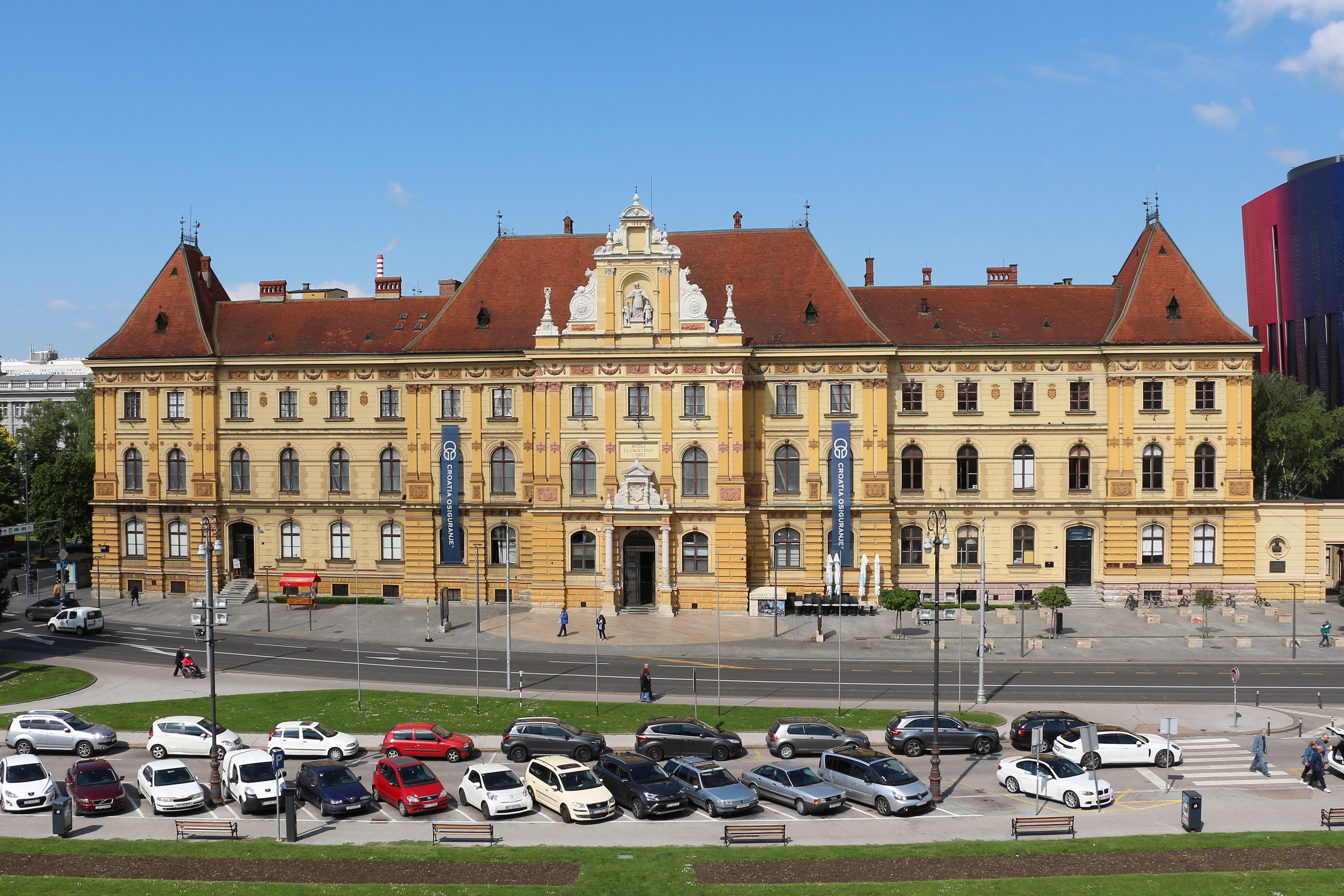
- Established: 1880; 146 years ago
- Location: Republic of Croatia Square, Zagreb, Croatia
- Coordinates: 45°48′33″N 15°58′07″E
- Type: Arts and crafts
- Collections: architecture, ceramics, clocks and watches, devotionalia, glass, graphic design, ivory, furniture, metal, musical instruments, painted leather, paintings, photographs and photographic equipment, photography up to 1950, printing and book binding, prints, product design, sculptures, textiles and fashion accessories, varia, Anka Gvozdanović's collection
- Collection size: 100,000
- Founder: Izidor Kršnjavi
- Director: Miroslav Gašparović
- Website: muo.hr

The Museum of Arts and Crafts (Croatian: Muzej za umjetnost i obrt) in Zagreb, Croatia, was established in 1880, by the initiative of the Arts Society and its former President Izidor Kršnjavi. Drawing on the theoretical precepts of England's Arts and Crafts movement and the intellectual postulates of Gottfried Semper, the museum was devised with the aim of creating a collection of models for master craftsmen and artist to reinvigorate the production of everyday use items. The strategy of the museum's activity was focused on preservation of traditional crafts, as well as creation of a new middle class aesthetic culture. Therefore, in 1882 the Crafts School (today Applied Art and Design School) was founded along the museum. The building, constructed in 1888 by Hermann Bollé, is one of the first purpose-built edifices devised to merge the functions of the museum and the school. Stylistically, the building is a grand historicist palace in the spirit of the German Renaissance.

The initial holdings had been founded several years before the Museum was formally assembled. The first permanent display in its unsuitable premises opened in Gajeva Street 26, while the complete permanent display was first seen in its own venue in 1909. The current permanent display, open in 1995 according to the ideas of the former director Vladimir Maleković, and the spatial articulation of architect Marijan Hržić, includes chosen objects from all museum collections. The permanent exhibition extends over three floors at more than 2,000 m^{2} of museum space and includes about 3,000 exhibits. The displayed objects illustrate the shift of stylistic periods from Gothic to Art Deco.

The museum houses more than 160,000 objects spanning from 4th to 20th century. The initial holdings of the Museum had been founded several years before the museum was formally assembled. The first objects for the future museum were bought in 1875 by Izidor Kršnjavi with a donation of bishop Josip Juraj Strossmayer at an inheritance auction of Catalan painter and collector Mariano Fortuny in Paris.

== The collections department ==
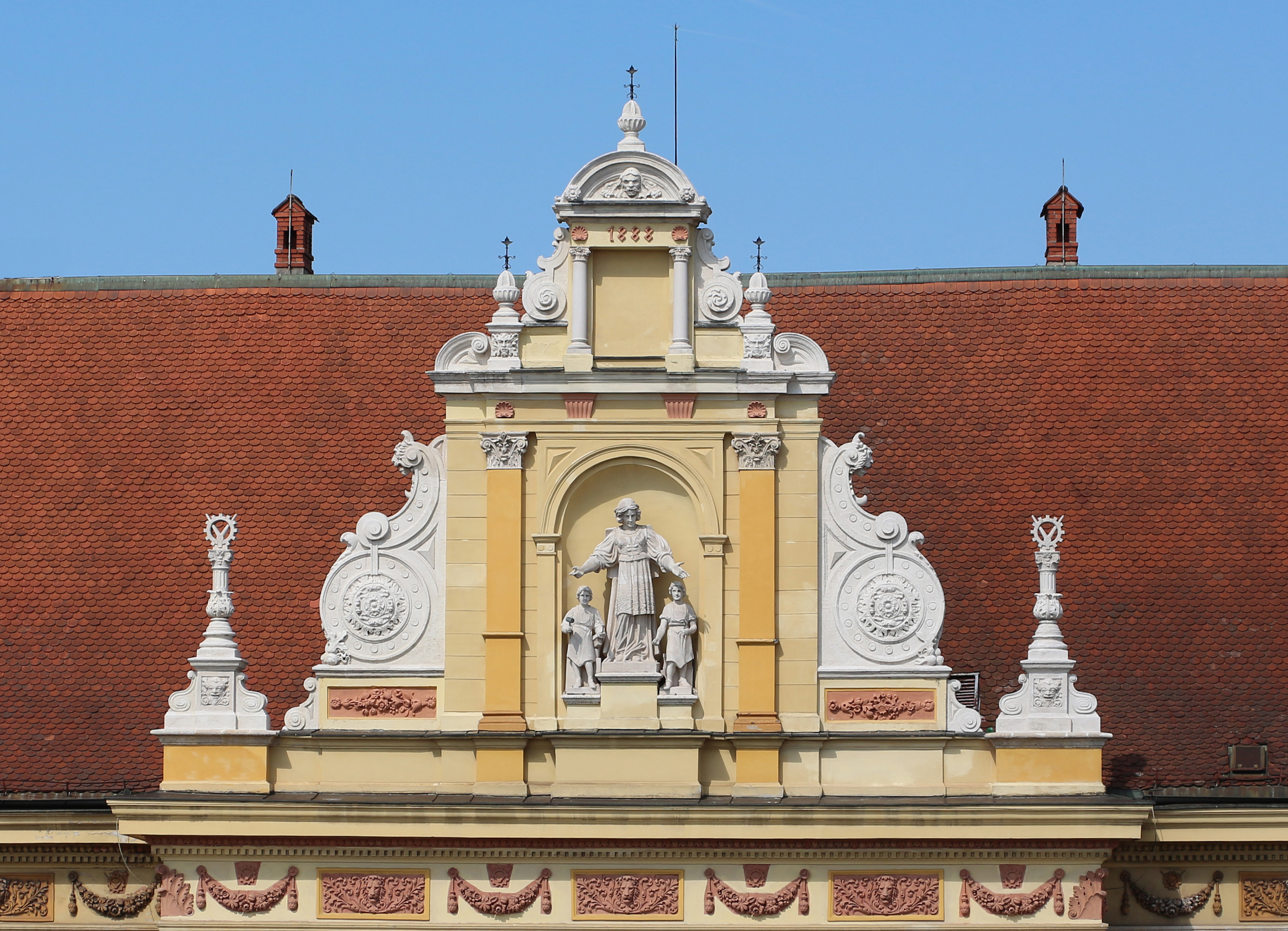
Pediment of the museum

The Collections Department systematically collects, studies, exhibits and publishes the museum material. From its beginnings, the Museum of Arts and Crafts has been systematically developing its 19 diverse collections, reorganising existing collections and founding new. Today this department curates about 100,000 objects that comprise the following collections: architecture, ceramics, clocks and watches, devotionalia, glass, graphic design, ivory, furniture, metal, musical instruments, painted leather, paintings, photographs and photographic equipment, photography up to 1950, printing and book binding, prints, product design, sculptures, textiles and fashion accessories, varia, and Anka Gvozdanović's collection (at 8 Visoka Street). The Anka Gvozdanović collection is temporarily closed as of 2021 due to the 2020 Zagreb earthquake.

== Restoration workshops ==
The museum has its own Restoration Department specialized in painting and sculpture, textile, furnishings and metal, and ceramics and glass.

== Library ==
The museum's library was founded at the same time as the museum itself. The idea of Izidor Kršnjavi, founder and first director of the Museum, was that along with providing basic lessons from art history it should provide suitable patterns from its collections to improve production in art and the fine crafts. This purpose was served by the collection of graphic patterns for all kinds of applied arts and ornaments characteristic of given periods of style. This historical collection of books is still kept in its original line-up, in an interior made according to designs by architect Hermann Bollé.

Since 1880, the library has developed and been transformed in accordance with the founding mission of the museum and the understanding of its role in the framework of currently valid conceptions of museology. Today, a contemporary specialised library, integrating the demands of contemporary museology and librarianship with the contents of holdings that are correlated with the collections, it is above all used to give support to specialised and scholarly work by museum personnel. The holdings of 65,000 volumes contain books, journals and reference works from the history of art, the fine crafts and kindred areas, print portfolios and albums of patterns for various crafts, catalogues of exhibitions and auctions. A special unit consists of the collection of rare and old books of the 16th to the 19th century that also has the significance of being a museum collection in itself. The library of the Museum exchanges publications with more than 150 similar institutions at home and abroad and has subscriptions for Croatian and foreign journals in the discipline.

== See also ==
- List of museums in Croatia
