= Stanko Fabris =

Croatian architect

- Born: 7 March 1909; Split, Kingdom of Dalmatia, Austria-Hungary
- Died: 30 December 1997 (aged 88); Zagreb, Croatia
- Education: Académie Royale des Beaux-Arts
- Occupation: Architect

Stanko Fabris (7 March 1909 – 30 December 1997) was a Croatian architect. After completing his secondary education in his hometown of Split, Fabris enrolled at the Académie Royale des Beaux-Arts in Brussels. Following graduation, Fabris worked as a planner in the administration of the Littoral Banovina. From 1942 he worked in Zagreb, first in the Z. Franjetić construction company and later in the Zagreb Designer Bureau where he would spend most of his life before retiring in 1980.

He designed dozens of notable public, residential and industrial buildings; these include houses and flats most of which were built in Split, public buildings such as the County Courthouse in Split, seven schools, numerous wineries and six factories. Two of his works have been given the status of Protected Cultural Heritage of Croatia by the Ministry of Culture; the "Dalmacijavino" winery in the Port of Split (1959), and the six story residential flats in the Vukovarska street in Zagreb built for the Yugoslav Navy. (1956/60).
