= Branko Gavella =

Croatian theatre director, critic and essayist

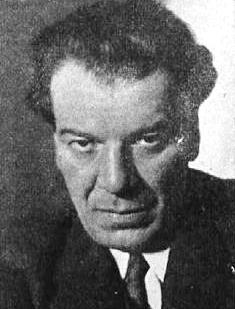
Branko Gavella

Branko Gavella (29 July 1885 – 8 April 1962) was a Croatian theatre director, critic and essayist.

== Biography ==
Born in Zagreb, Croatia (which was at the time part of Austria-Hungary) Gavella finished high school in his hometown before enrolling at the University of Vienna where he studied philosophy and German studies. He graduated and subsequently earned a doctorate there in 1908, after which he returned to Zagreb. In 1909 he was employed by the National and University Library in Zagreb. He began writing theatre reviews the following year, published in the local German-language daily Agramer Tagblatt, for which he contributed from 1910 to 1918.

During this time he was also an active member of the HAŠK sports society, and is known for refereeing the opening match of the first ever Croatian association football league championship in September 1912 played between HŠK Croatia and Tipografski ŠK at HAŠK's ground which later became Maksimir Stadium.

In 1914 Gavella began directing at the Croatian National Theatre in Zagreb (HNK) and in the 1930s his essays on theatre theory were published in several cultural magazines, including the short-lived literary magazine Danas edited by Miroslav Krleža (which was launched in January 1934 in Belgrade and had only five issues before being banned by Yugoslav authorities in May 1934). Gavella had greatly influenced the development of HNK in the following decades as he became director of Drama at the theatre and directed a number of plays and operas and was instrumental in setting up HNK's in-house drama school. His tenure at HNK was also marked by his emphasis on performing plays written by Croatian authors (such as Marin Držić, Ivan Gundulić, Tituš Brezovački, Miroslav Krleža and Milan Begović) along with world-renowned authors (like William Shakespeare, Luigi Pirandello and Richard Wagner).

After World War II Gavella spent several years directing in Bratislava, Ostrava and Ljubljana before returning to Zagreb once again in 1949. For his work in Ljubljana (namely, the direction of plays Deep are the Roots by James Gow and Arnaud d'Usseau and A Month in the Country by Ivan Turgenev, and the opera Jenůfa by Leoš Janáček), Gavella was awarded the Prešeren Award, the highest Slovenian prize for artistic achievements, in 1949.

Upon returning to Zagreb, he established the Academy of Theatre Arts (Croatian: Akademija za kazališnu umjetnost, present-day Academy of Dramatic Art) in 1950. Three years later, dissatisfied by the conservative approach to theatre at HNK, Gavella was one of the founders of the alternative Zagreb Drama Theatre in May 1953, which had its first premiere in October 1953 with a production of Golgotha by Miroslav Krleža (the theatre later adopted its current name Gavella Drama Theatre in honor of their founder in 1970).

In 1959 he won the inaugural annual Vladimir Nazor Award for achievements in theatre, and was made a member of the Yugoslav Academy of Sciences and Arts (the present-day Croatian Academy of Sciences and Arts) in 1961. Gavella died the following year aged 76 and was buried at the Mirogoj Cemetery.

During his career Gavella directed around 270 plays, operas and operettas, and authored a number of essays about Croatian playwrights and poets such as Držić, Mažuranić, Šenoa, Vojnović and Krleža. His writings on the history of Croatian theatre and the theory of theatre were compiled in several books, some of which were published posthumously. He also translated a number of plays and librettos into Croatian (including works such as Shakespeare's Macbeth, which he translated for his 1957 production of the play).

== Books by Gavella ==
- Hrvatsko glumište (Croatian Theatre, Zagreb, 1953, OCLC 26510493)
- Glumac i kazalište (Actor and Theatre, Novi Sad, 1967, OCLC 450752764)
- Književnost i kazalište (Literature and Theatre, Zagreb, 1970, OCLC 439908133)

== See also ==
- Gavella Drama Theatre
- Croatian National Theatre in Zagreb
- Academy of Dramatic Art, University of Zagreb

Academic offices
Preceded by Josip Škavić	Rector of the Zagreb Academy of Dramatic Art; 1954–1962	Succeeded by Kosta Spaić
