= Bratoljub Klaić =

Bratoljub Klaić (also Adolf Klaić; 27 July 1909 in Bizovac – 1983 in Zagreb) was a Croatian linguist and translator.

== Biography ==
He was born in the municipality of Bizovac in the Kingdom of Croatia-Slavonia as Adolf Klaić. His father, Adolf Klotz, changed the family name to Klaić. After finishing classical gymnasium in Zagreb, and graduating at the Faculty of Philosophy the history of South Slavic languages and literatures, Czech and German, Bratoljub Klaić pursues further specialisation in Poland and Czech Republic. He received his Ph.D. in 1941 with the thesis Bizovačko narječje ('The dialect of Bizovac'). He was a professor at the gymnasium in Vukovar, Prijedor, Osijek and Zagreb, and at the Viša pedagoška škola in Zagreb. From 1950. he is a professor of Croatian language at the Academy for Theater and Film Arts.

As a member of the State Committee for Language in NDH, Klaić has, in collaboration with other members, arranged an orthographical handbook Koriensko pisanje ('Root-based writing'; 1942), and with Franjo Cipra also a voluminous Hrvatski pravopis ('Croatian orthography'; 1944, reprint in 1992), both based on the morphological-etymological principles in accordance with the official language policy.

He became famous for his Rječnik stranih riječi ('The dictionary of foreign words'), originally published in 1951 and printed in several editions, most recently in 2012. He translated from foreign languages (Aeschylus, Sophocles, Euripides, Virgil etc.). As a versed accentologist, he published papers on Croatian prosody, leaving an orthoepical dictionary in MS. He commented and provided critical editions of various Croatian writers (e.g. in the edition Pet stoljeća hrvatske književnosti, 'The five centuries of Croatian literature') and linguistically adapted many theater and film performances. He practised diction with actors for the shows and was a main interpreter for unknown words. He studied Polish-Croatian cultural ties and wrote on them. Beside linguistics, he also studied literary theory (Između jezikoslovlja i nauke o književnosti, 'Between linguistics and the literary theory'; 1972).

In Croatian studies as well as in Croatian culture in general, Bratoljub Klaić left a permanent written and oral mark as a versed lexicographer and orthographical normativist.

== Sources ==
- Rođen Bratoljub Klaić (in Croatian)
