= Nikola Šubić Zrinski Square =

Square and park in Zagreb, Croatia

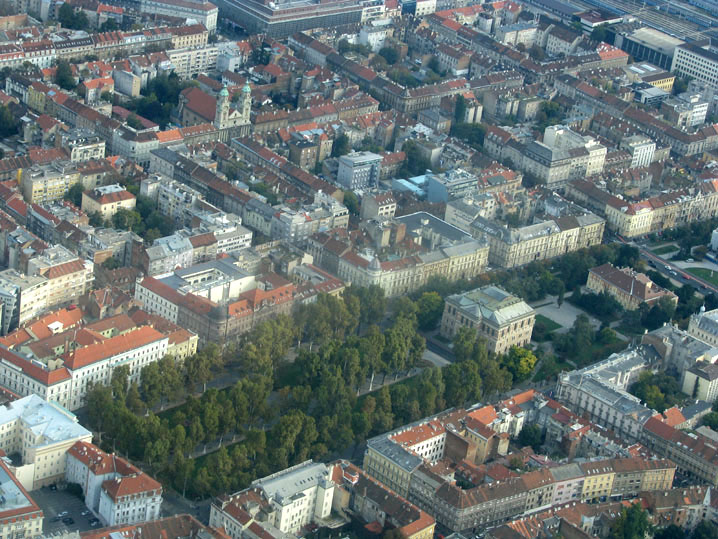
- Aerial view of the park
- Interactive map of Nikola Šubić Zrinski Square
- Type: Park
- Location: Zagreb, Croatia
- Coordinates: 45°48′37″N 15°58′41″E
- Area: 3.00 ha (7.4 acres)
- Created: 1892.
- Operator: Zagreb Holding
- Status: Monument of Park Architecture
- Public transit: ZET lines 6 & 13

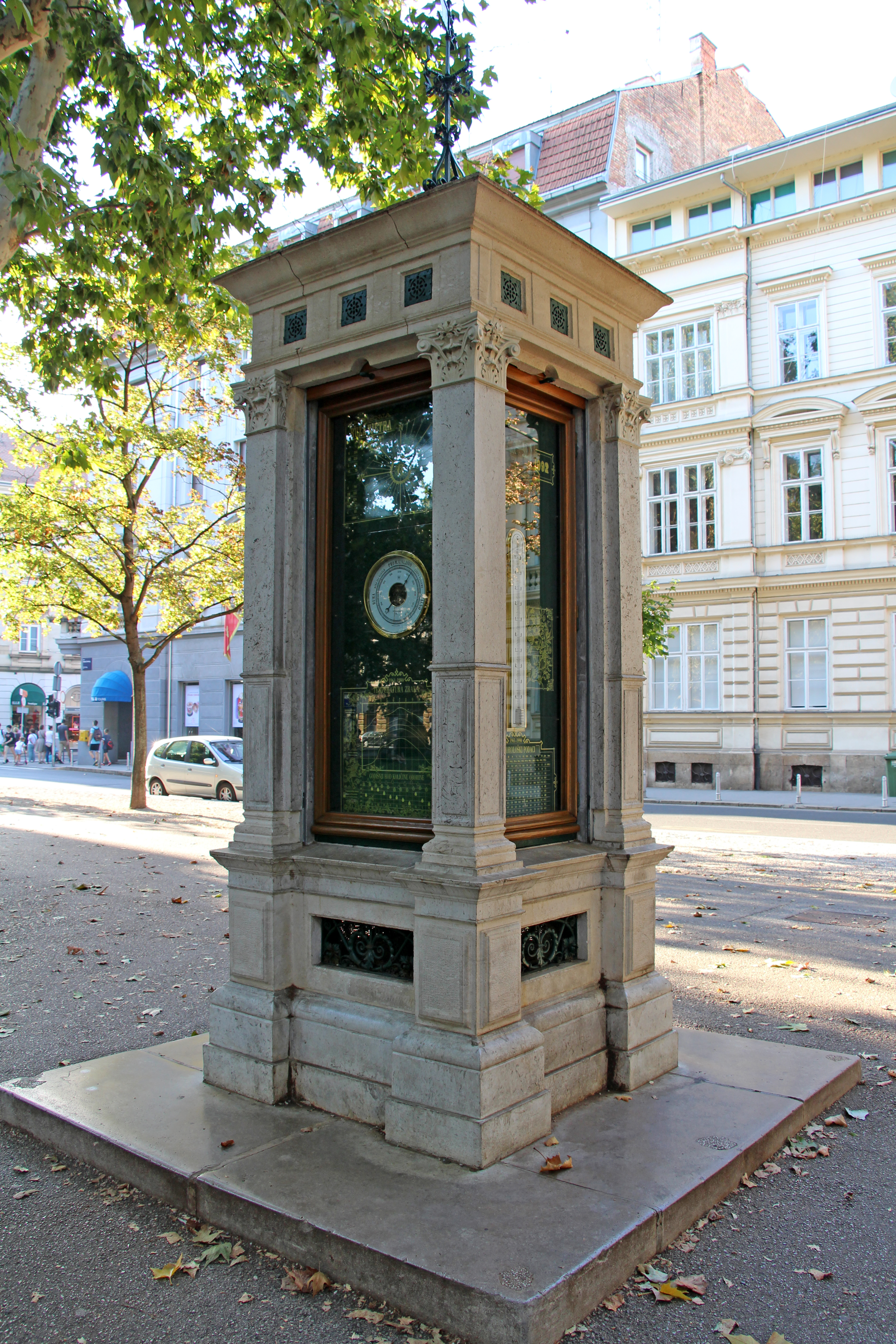
The Meteorological Pole in Zrinjevac was set up as a gift of a military doctor and amateur meteorologist Dr. Adolf Holzera. It was made of Istrian marble, meteorological instruments were acquired at Göttingen, and the clock was the work of Zagreb's König. Arch. Hermann Bollé

Nikola Šubić Zrinski Square (Croatian: Trg Nikole Šubića Zrinskog, popularly referred to as Zrinjevac) is a square and park in Donji Grad, the central part of Zagreb, the capital of Croatia. It is located near the central Ban Jelačić Square, halfway towards the Main Railway Station. It is a part of the Green horseshoe or Lenuci's horseshoe (Croatian: Zelena potkova or Lenucijeva potkova), which consists of seven squares in Donji grad. It is spread over an area of 12,540 square meters (135,000 sq ft).

The southern part of Zrinjevac sports busts of significant Croatian people: Julije Klović, Andrija Medulić, Fran Krsto Frankopan, Nikola Jurišić, Ivan Kukuljević Sakcinski and Ivan Mažuranić.

In the middle of the park is a music pavilion built in 1891, gift of Eduard Prister, to the city of Zagreb.

Several institution are based in buildings around Zrinjevac:

- North side - The Supreme Court of the Republic of Croatia,
- West side - The Zagreb Archaeological Museum,
- South side - The Croatian Academy of Sciences and Arts, Strossmayer Gallery of Old Masters
- East side - The Ministry of Foreign and European Affairs and the Zagreb County Court.

== Gallery ==
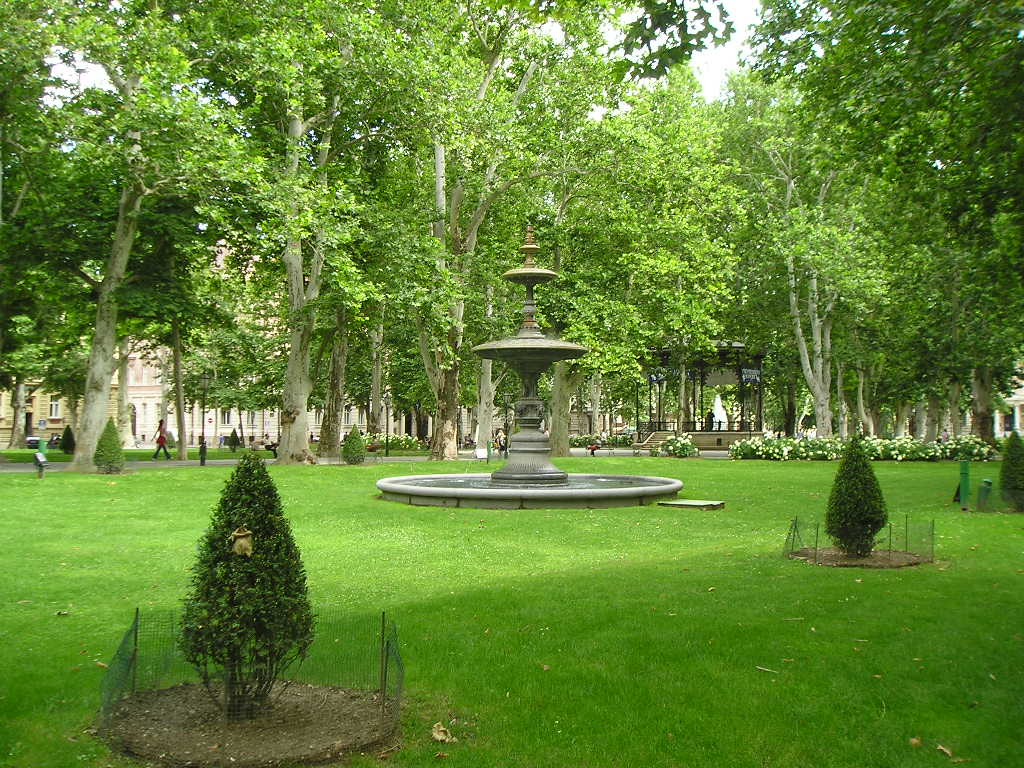
Nikola Šubić Zrinski Square, in the center of Zagreb.

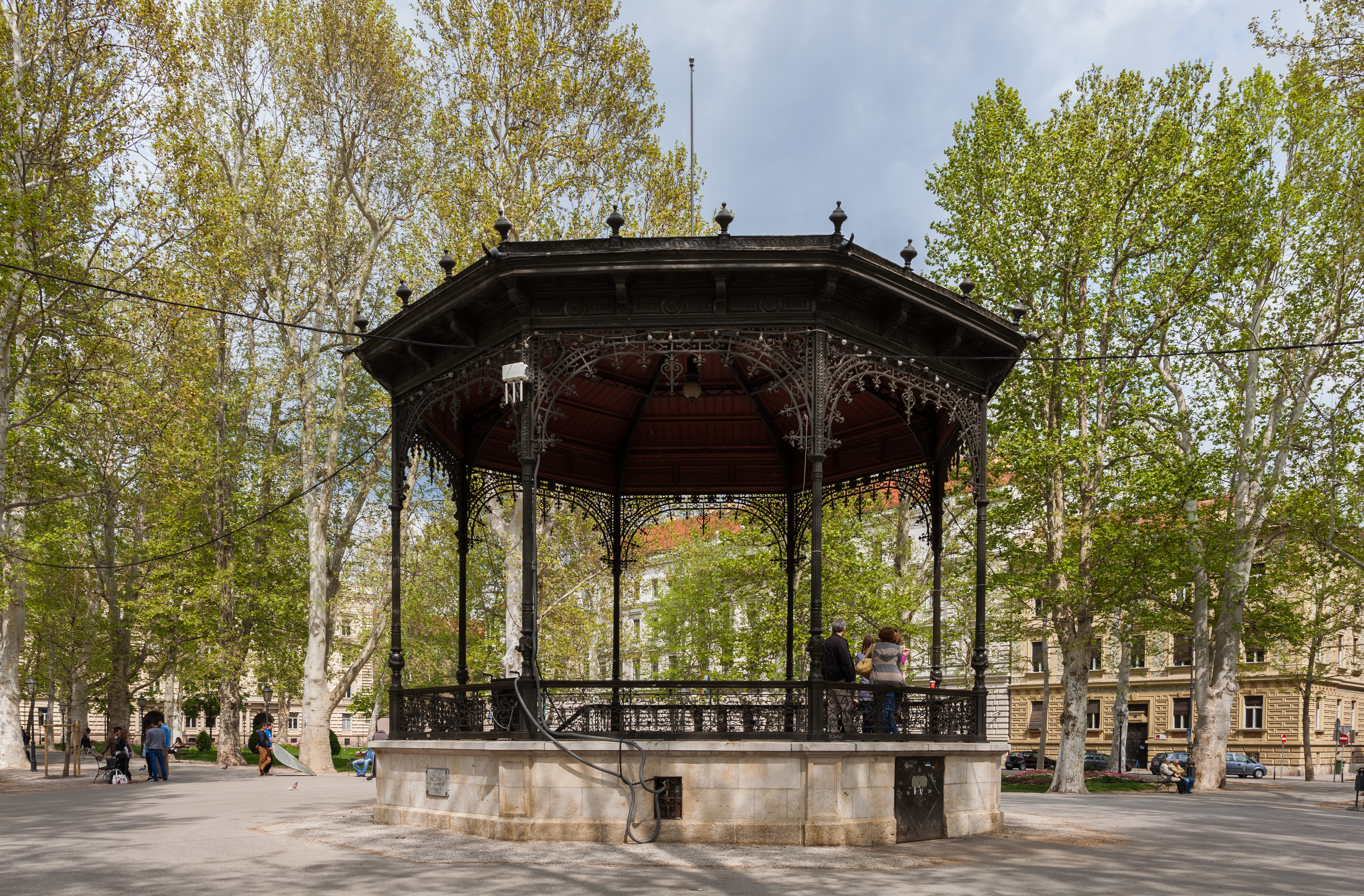
Music Pavilion

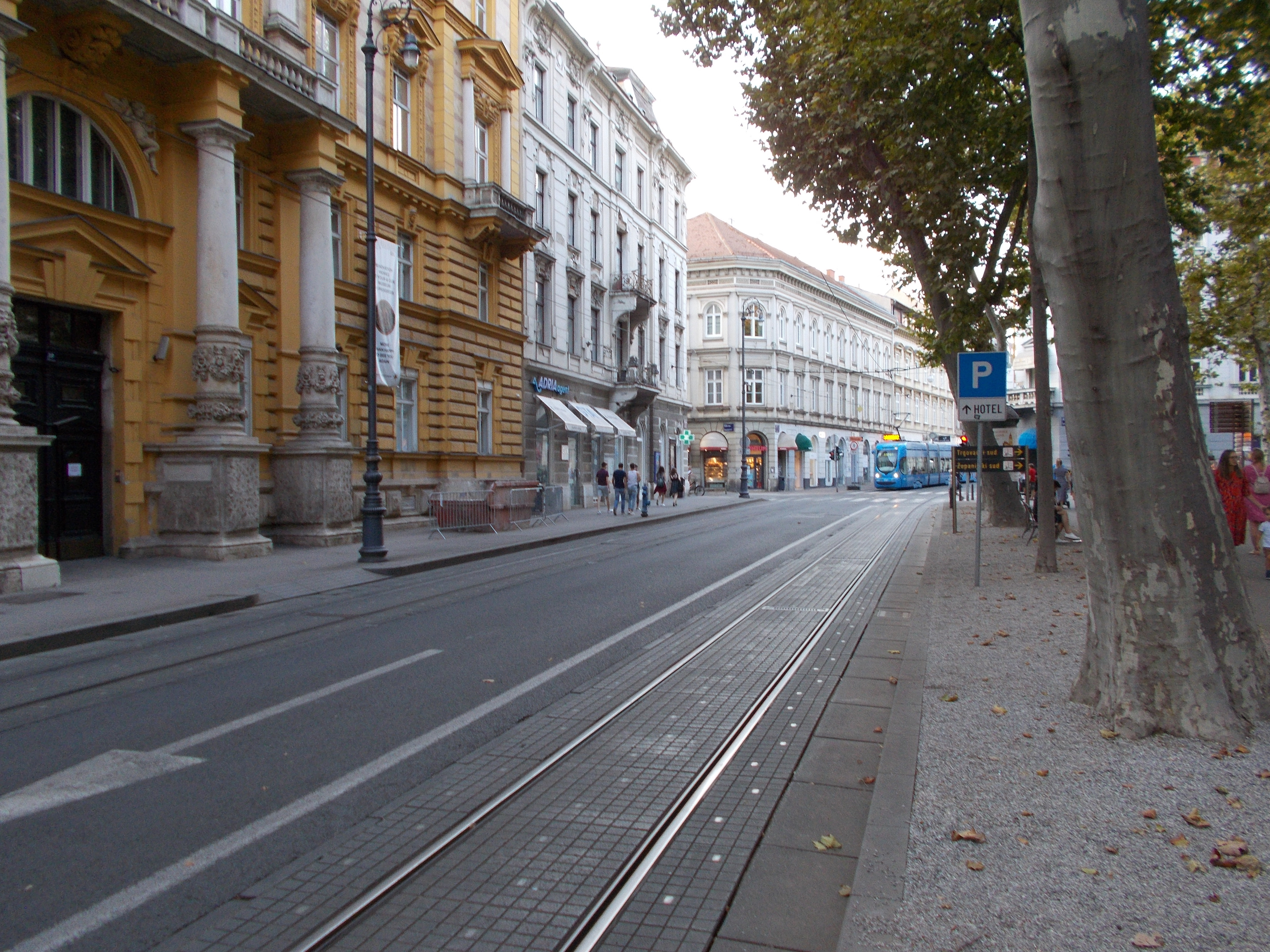
Zrinjevac street with tram lines 6 & 13

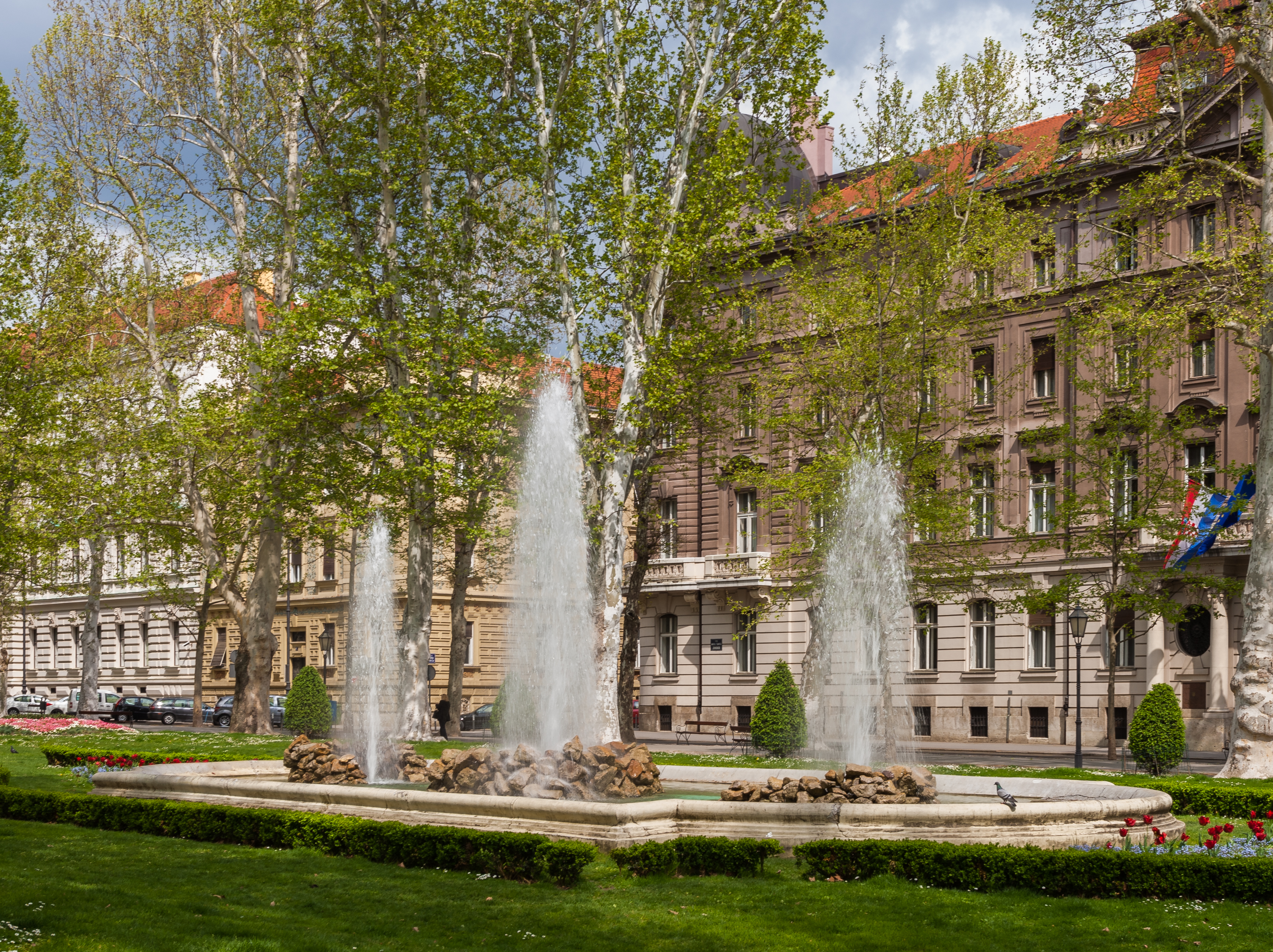
Fountain

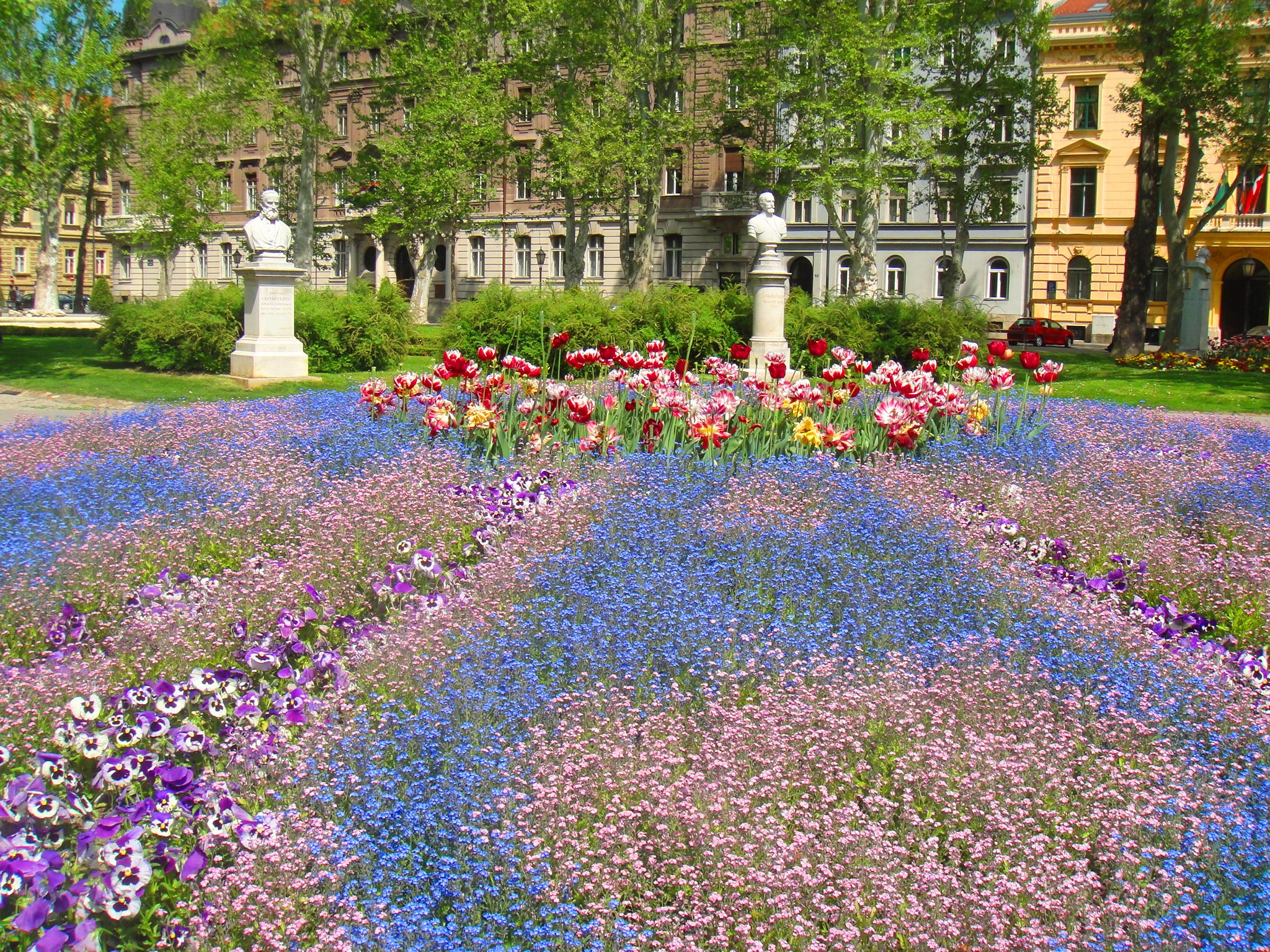
Flower path

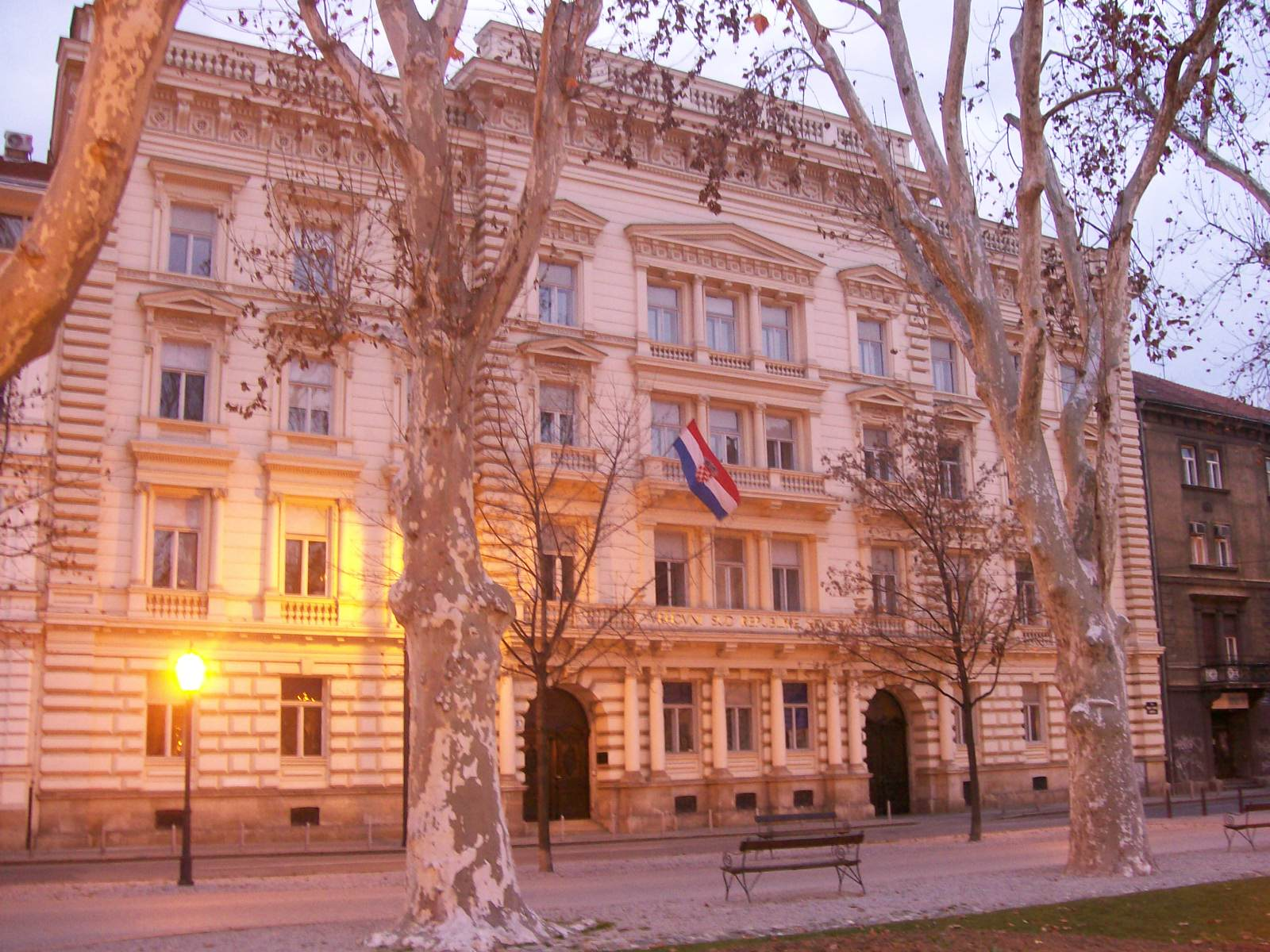
Supreme Court of the Republic of Croatia

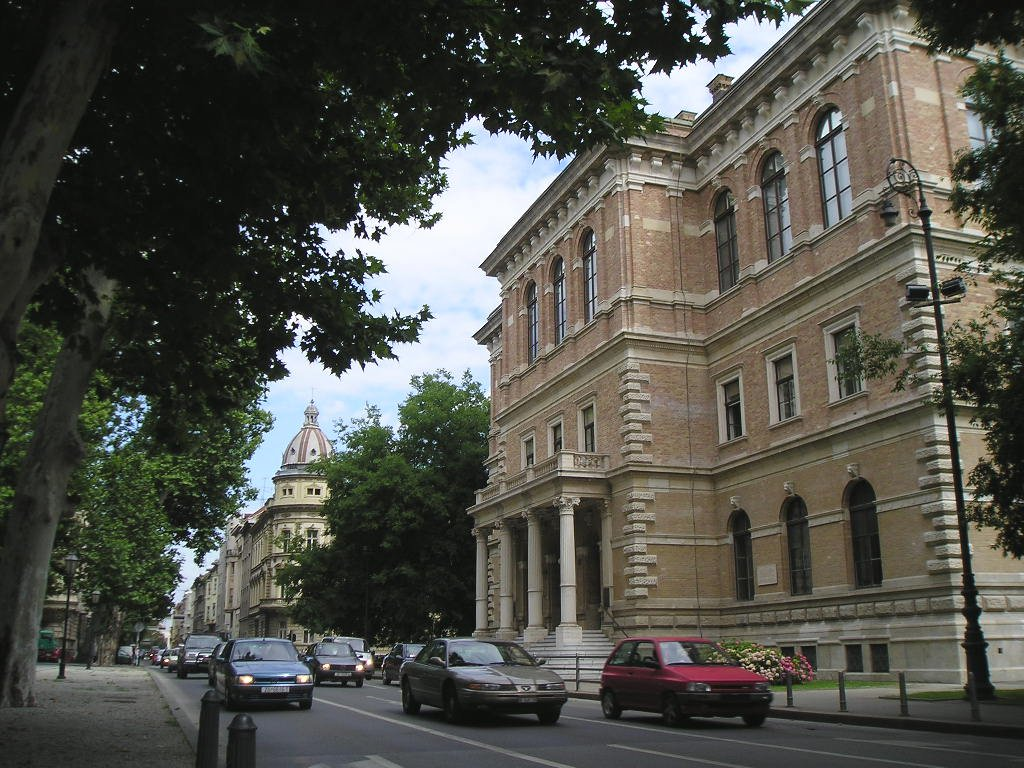
Strossmayer Gallery of Old Masters

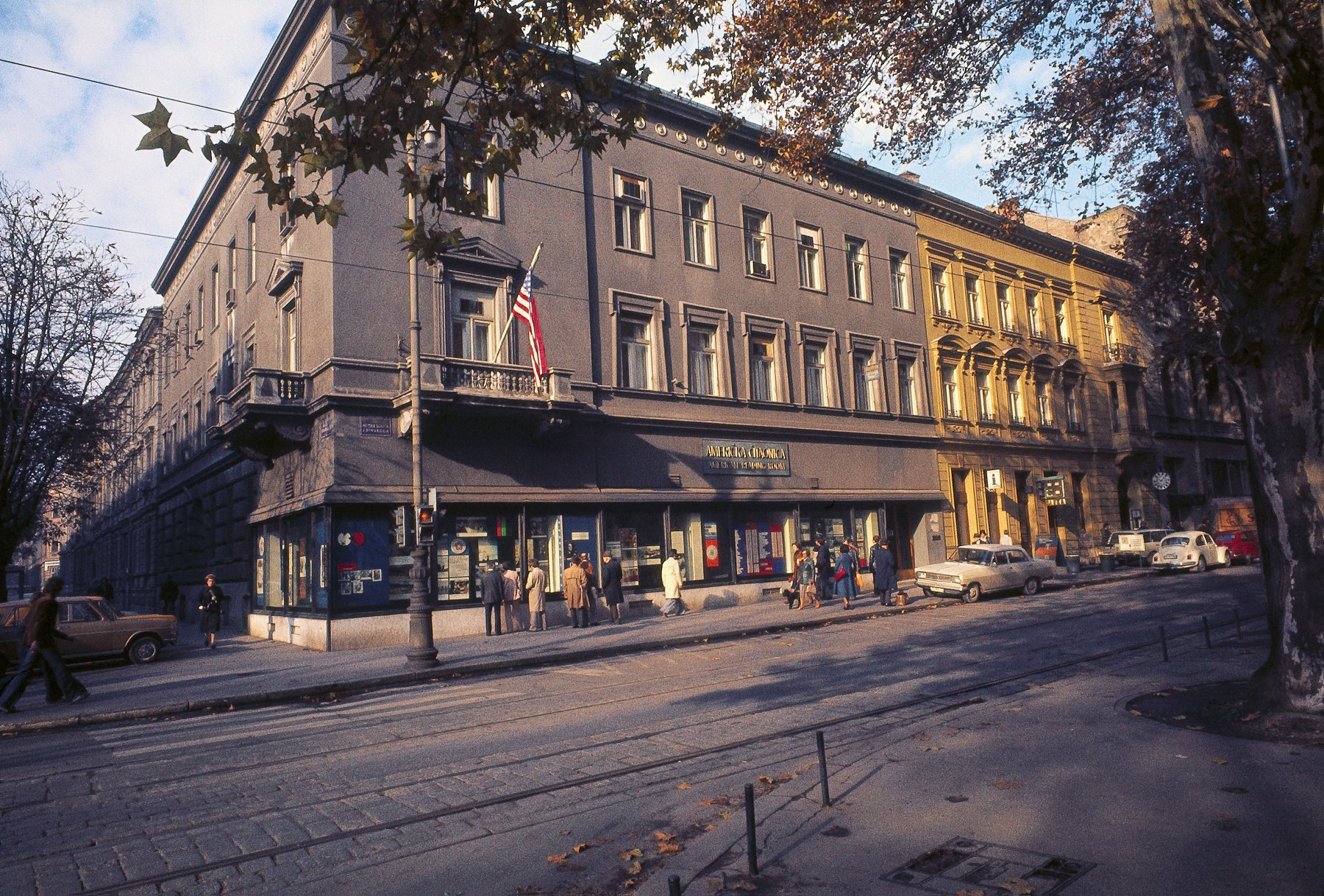
US Consulate in 1977

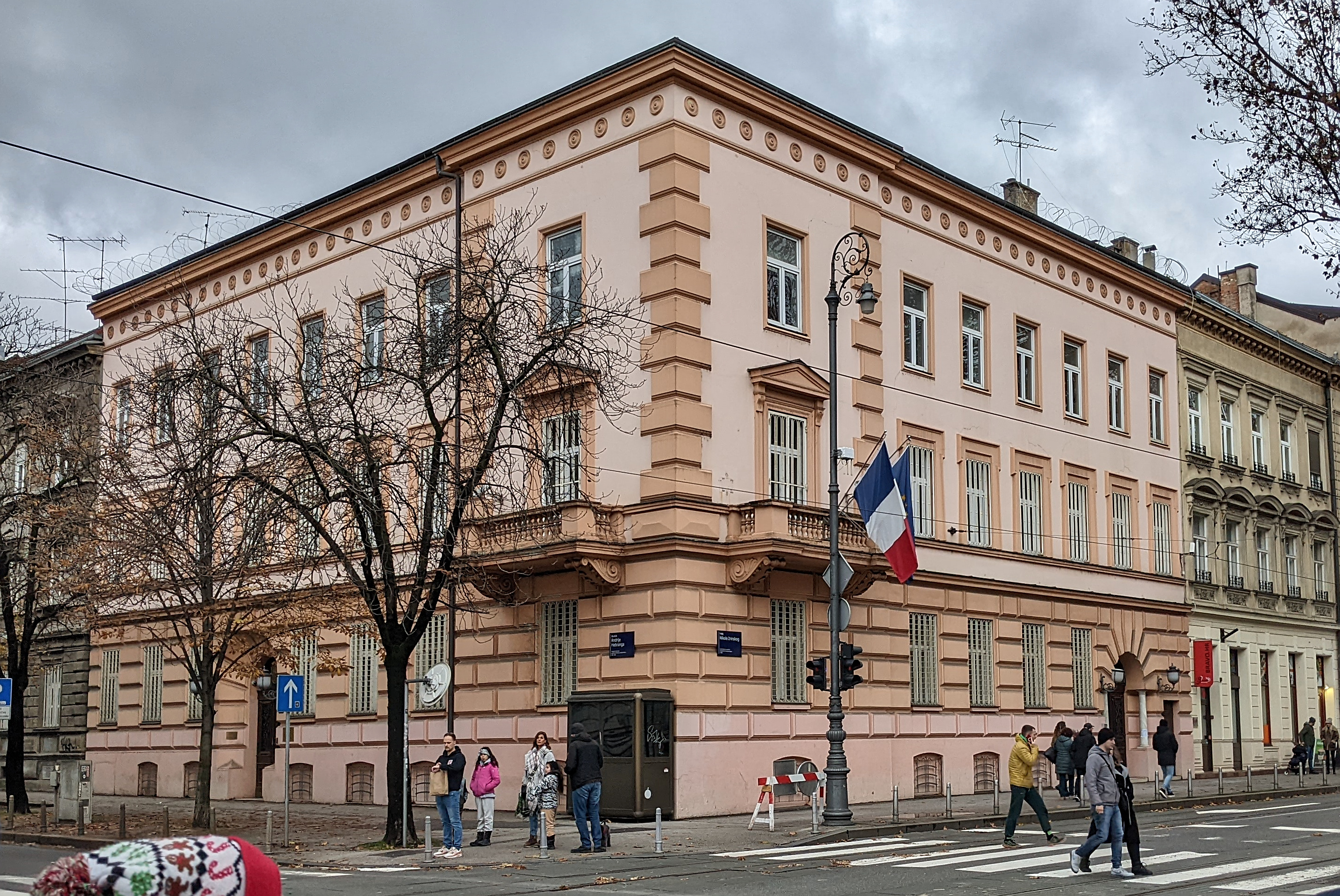
Embassy of Republic of France
