= Theatre of Croatia =

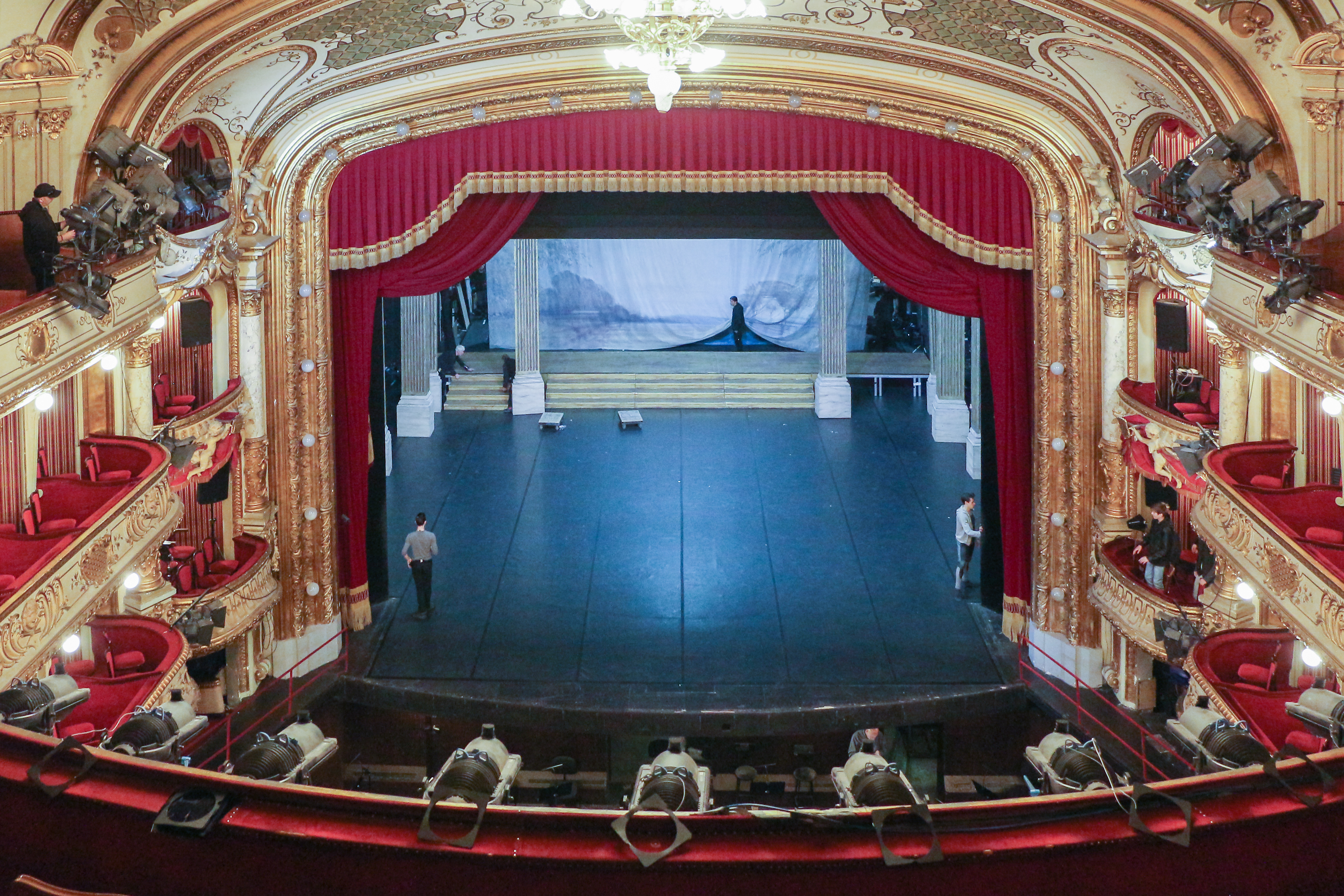
Interior of Croatian National Theatre, Zagreb

Theatre in Croatia refers to the history of the performing arts in Croatia, or theatrical performances written, acted and produced by Croatians. Croatian theatre generally falls into the Western theatre tradition, with influences especially from Italy, Germany, Austria and other European nations.

Croatian theatre dates back at least as far as the Middle Ages, with a combination of religious liturgical dramas, and secular performances of travelling entertainers. During the Renaissance, there was a flowering of dramatic writing and performances in Dalmatia, especially in Dubrovnik and on the island of Hvar. Notable playwrights of the time were Marin Držić and Hanibal Lucić.

In other parts of Croatia, theatres started to appear in the late 18th, early 19th century in cities such as Split, Dubrovnik, Šibenik, Zadar, Osijek, Varaždin, Pula, Rijeka, and Zagreb. The development of a Croatian National Theatre evolved from Zagreb's first city theatre on St Mark's Square. Beginning in the 1860s, performances were increasingly written and given in Croatian.

Today, Croatia boasts a strong tradition of theatres and theatrical companies all round the country. Performances range from dramas and musicals for adults or children, youth theatre and puppet theatre. Croatia is also home to the world's oldest Theatre of the Blind. Festivals are held in several locations in the summer.

== History ==
=== Classical ===
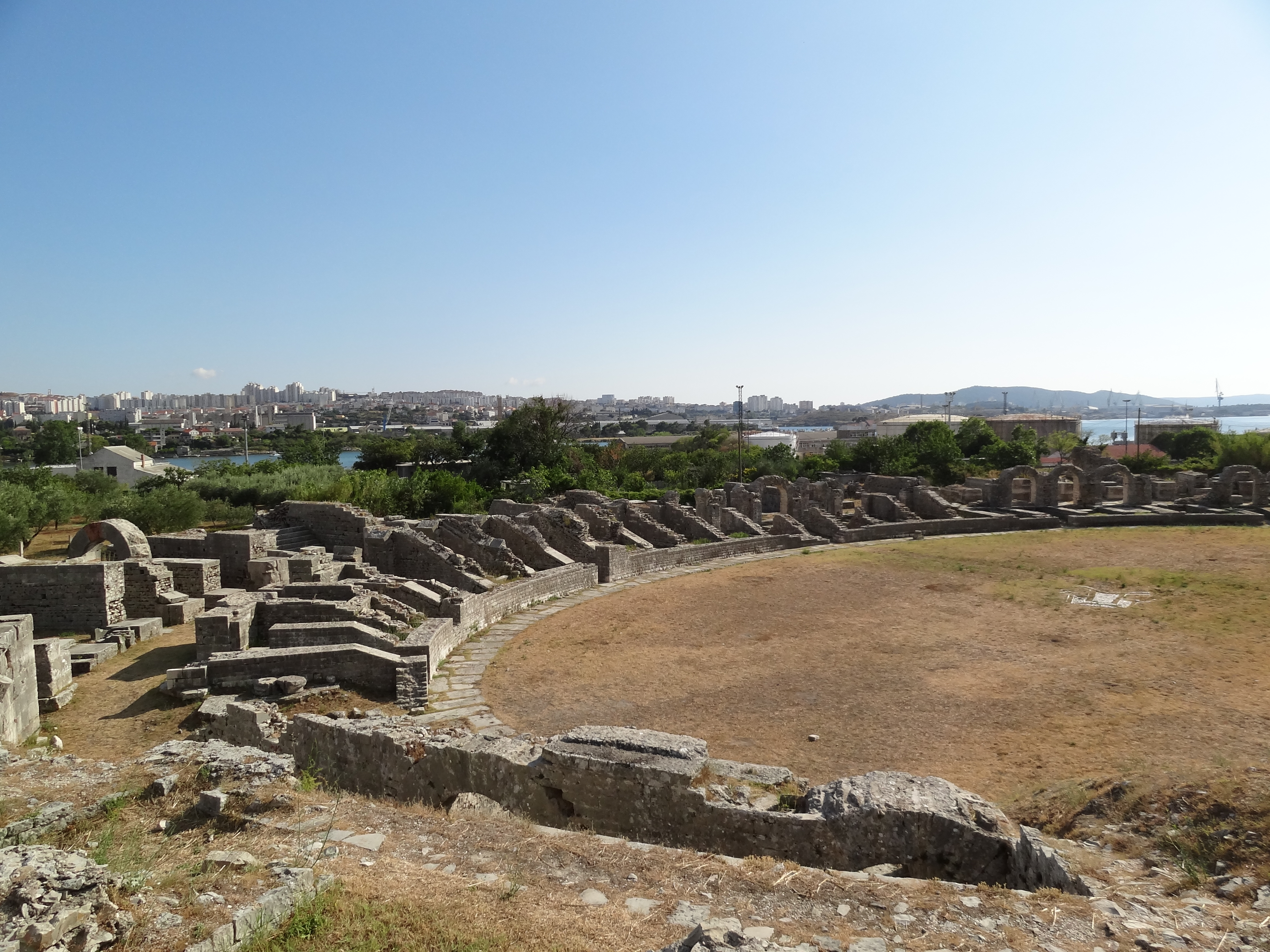
1st century Roman Theatre in Salona, Dalmatia

The very first theatre venues in today's Croatia were built during the Roman period. The remains of a Classical theatre can be seen in ancient Salona near Split, and in Pula there are remains of a smaller Roman theatre, both dating from the 1st century.

=== Medieval plays ===
The first evidence of theatrical performances in Croatia refers to liturgical scenes that formed part of the mass celebration in medieval churches. Mostly anonymous and initially only Latin texts, they presented dialogues between biblical or saintly characters. At first these were sung or chanted by priests, but later by lay people at the altar or in parts of the church that served as a stage. In the oldest ritual of the Zagreb Cathedral from the 11th century, two Latin liturgical dramas have been preserved, the Easter Visitatio sepulchri and the Epiphany Tractus stellae, and in the Vrbnica Missal from 1462 there is a fragment written in Glagolitic in the Old Church Slavonic Croatian edition. From these liturgical scenes, other secular religious dramas developed: miracles (legends of the saints), passion (sufferings of Jesus and the saints), and morality (Christian teaching).

Along with the liturgical dramas, there were secular performances, associated with travelling musicians and entertainers who would perform at public events such as weddings, church holidays, or carnival processions.

=== Renaissance theatre ===
The renaissance saw the first organized theatrical events given by named authors, mostly in the literary centres of Dubrovnik and Hvar, but also to some extent in Korčula and in public performances in Zagreb (in Latin). The Renaissance theatre brought a flourishing of dramatic literature.

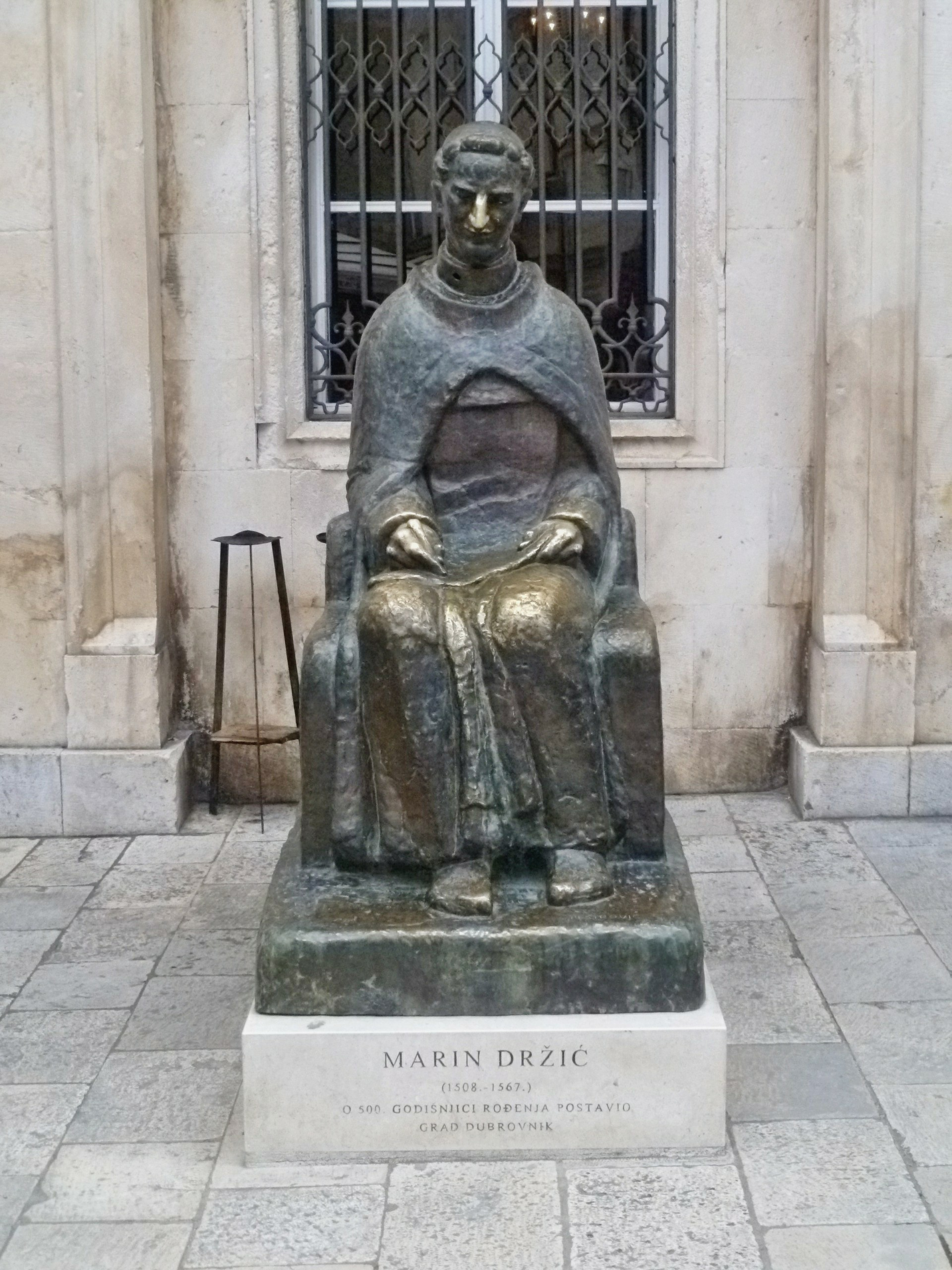
Statue of Marin Držić in Dubrovnik

Born in Dubrovnik, then known as the Republic of Ragusa, Marin Držić is considered to be one of the finest renaissance authors in Croatian literature His work covers many fields: lyric poetry, pastorals, political letters and pamphlets, and comedies. While his pastorals (Tirena, Venera i Adon and Plakir) are still highly regarded as masterful examples of the genre, his comedies are among the best in European Renaissance literature. Držić's comedies are full of exuberant life and vitality, celebrating love, liberty and sincerity and mocking avarice, egoism and petty tyrants — both in the family and in the state. His best-known comedies include: Pomet (1548 or 1553), Novela od Stanca (1550), Dundo Maroje (1551 or 1556) – his best-known play which was also performed abroad, and Skup (1554)

Meanwhile, in Hvar, another important author of the Croatian renaissance was Hanibal Lucić who, as well as poetry, also wrote Robinja (The Slave Girl being the first secular play in Croatian literature). Also writing drama around this time were authors such as Mavro Vetranović, Nikola Nalješković, Martin Benetović, Dinko Zlatarić. The influence of Italian theatre was strong, which can be seen in the themes of the plays and the theatrical terminology. New, specially built indoor stages gave the actors more space to move around, and scenic backdrops introduced, suitable for tragic, comic or pastoral dramas. Some amateur theatre companies were founded.

In 1610, the oldest public theatre in Europe was opened in Hvar. Earlier Italian theatres such as the Teatro Olimpico in Vicenza (1584) were privately built, while the Hvar theatre, added as part of the reconstruction works to the Arsenal building, was financed by the commune for the people of Hvar. Modified over the years, it is still in existence serving the same purpose today.

=== Baroque theatre ===
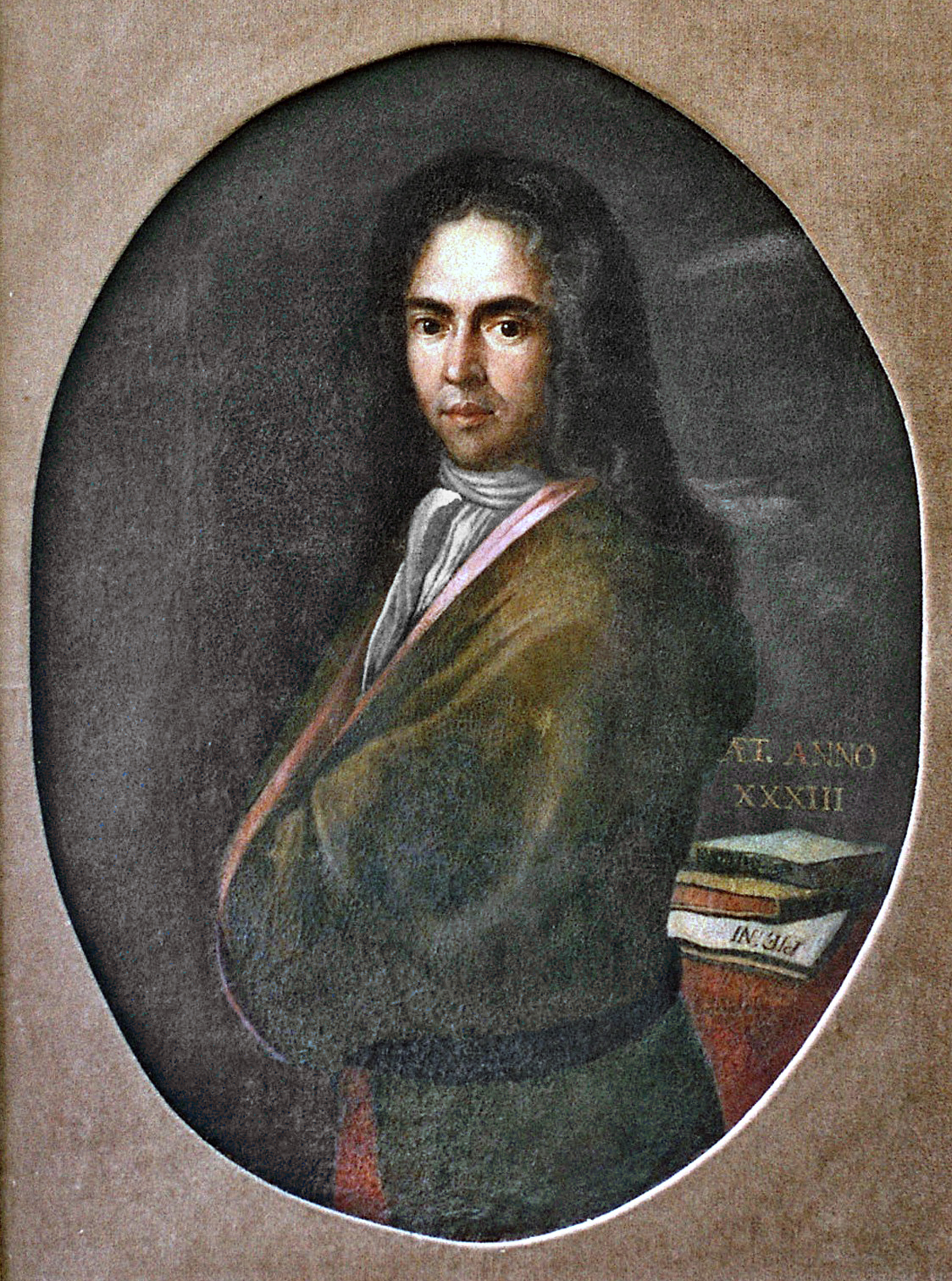
Ivan Gundulić (1589–1638)

During the 17th century, theatrical performances were taking place throughout most of Croatia, but the main creative centre was still Dubrovnik. In addition to the old theatrical forms, new ones began to appear: melodrama and musical pastorals (Ivan Gundulić, Junije Palmotić) and te trionfe i anonimne komedije with influences of commedia dell'arte.

Music now took an increasing role, and some performances could almost be called operas. New stage design allowed for improved decor, costumes, and lighting, and even an increased number of performers. The equipment became more complex, and fantastic new stage effects designed for specific performances: mountains and seas which could be dismantled, angels or monsters would appear and disappear, gods come down from heaven. More demanding performances called for printed manuals (translated from the original Italian) to deal with the dynamic equipment and lighting fixtures.

One of the leading figures of the Dubrovnik literary scene was Ivan Gundulić, whose most famous play is Dubravka, a pastoral written in 1628, where he rhapsodises on the former glory of Dubrovnik and it contains some of the most famous verses in Croatian literature:

Croatian

O liepa, o draga, o slatka slobodo,
dar u kom sva blaga višnji nam Bog je dô,
uzroče istini od naše sve slave,
uresu jedini od ove Dubrave,
sva srebra, sva zlata, svi ljudcki životi
ne mogu bit plata tvôj čistoj lipoti.

English

Fair liberty, beloved liberty, liberty sweetly avowed,
thou are the treasured gift that God to us endowed,
all our glory is thy true creation,
to our Home thou are all the decoration,
no silver nor gold, not life itself could replace
the reward of thy pure and sublime grace.

=== Age of Enlightenment ===
During the 18th and early 19th centuries, performances took place in various venues and there was an increasingly professional approach to theatre. The lavishness of the Baroque performances continued with elaborate costumes and inventive stage solutions. The first theatrical programs were printed, and more cities were involved in theatrical life (Split, Trogir, Šibenik, Zadar, Senj, Rijeka, and Karlovac). Dubrovnik was still the core of dramatic creativity, but there was less original dramatic writing. In the northern part of Croatia, most of the theatrical productions were connected with the schools of certain priestly orders, for example the Jesuits in Zagreb, Varaždin, Požega, Osijek, and Rijeka, the Franciscans in Osijek, Slavonski Brod, and Vukovar, and the Paulines in Senj.

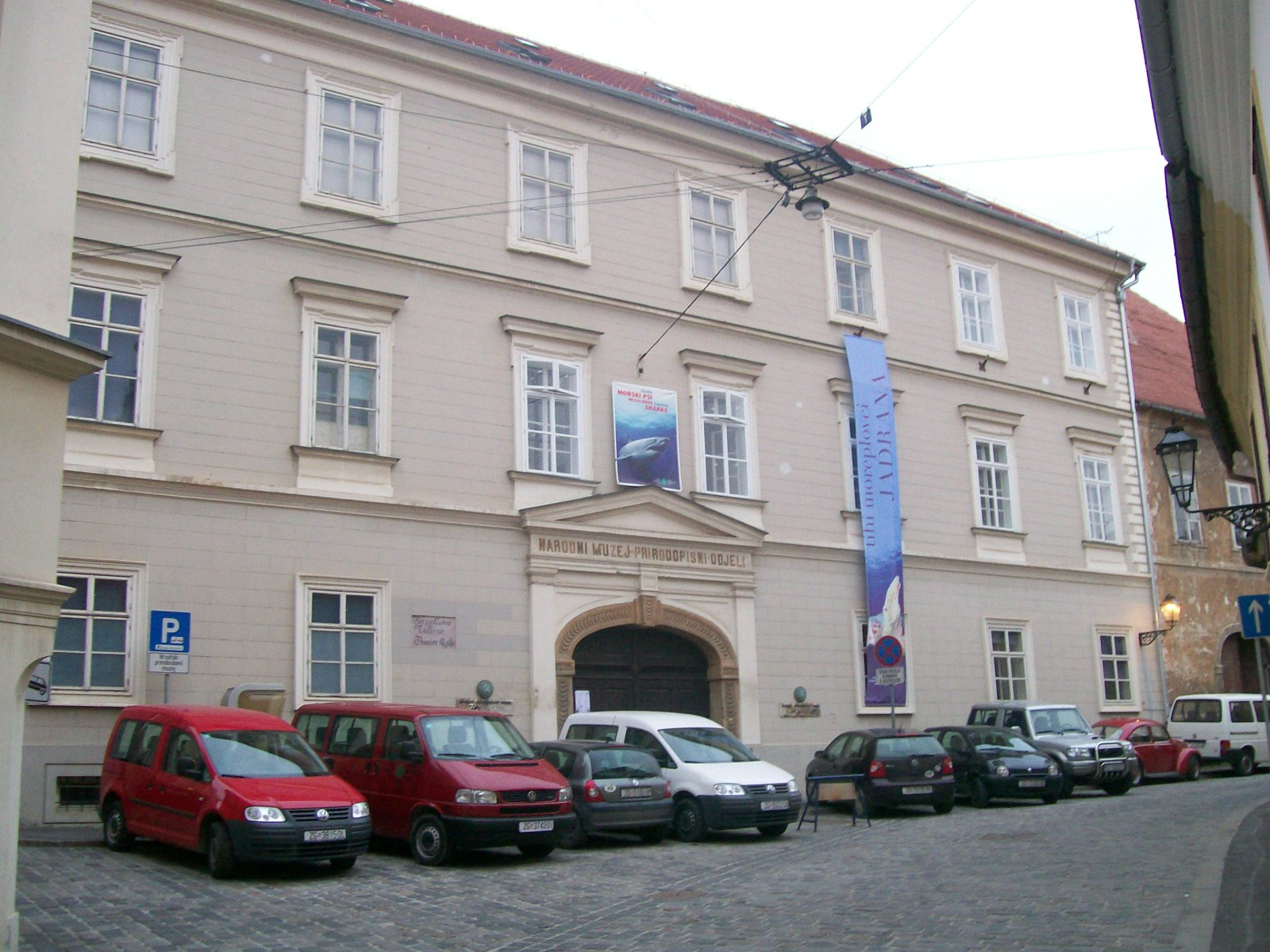
Former Amadeo's theatre, now Croatian Natural History Museum.

One of the first performances that was explicitly performed in Croatian was "Cyrus in solium vocatur" (Cirus Called to the Throne) in 1766.

Zagreb's first public theatre hall was part of the Kulmer-Pejačević palace, which is now the Croatian Natural History Museum at Demetrova 1. It had many of the characteristics of a public theatre, including tickets and publicity leaflets. Operating from 1797 to 1834, it was known as Amadeo's theatre after Count Antal Amade de Várkony county prefect of Zagreb. The theatre was rented exclusively to German companies, but in 1832 and 1833 German actors also performed several plays in Kajkavian.

=== Nationalism and city theatres ===
At the turn of the 19th century, dramatic performances in the Kajkavian dialect flourished, with the most important author being Tituš Brezovački, who wrote («Matijaš grabancijaš dijak», «Diogeneš»). In Dubrovnik, 23 plays by Molière were translated and performed, still unusual at the time. The best drama written in Croatian during the 18th century was "Kate Kapuralica" by Vlaha Stulli.

The beginning of the nineteenth century is also marked by the strong influence of German theatre, which can be seen in the theatrical terminology of the time, but also in the increasingly professional work habits and organization. Many Croatian actors and theatre workers gained their experience by watching guest performances by German theatre companies or they would travel to Germany and Austria to learn at first hand.

In 1834, the first real theatre space was opened on St. Mark's Square in Zagreb. The golden age of construction of theatre halls in Croatia came between 1859 and 1895, when large theatres were built in Split, Dubrovnik, Šibenik, Zadar, Osijek, Varaždin, Pula, Rijeka and Zagreb. Following that, theatrical life in Croatia gradually became more professionalized and despite a number of political and material difficulties, a single national theatre was formed, primarily due to the efforts of Dimitrije Demeter, August Šenoa and Stjepan Miletić.

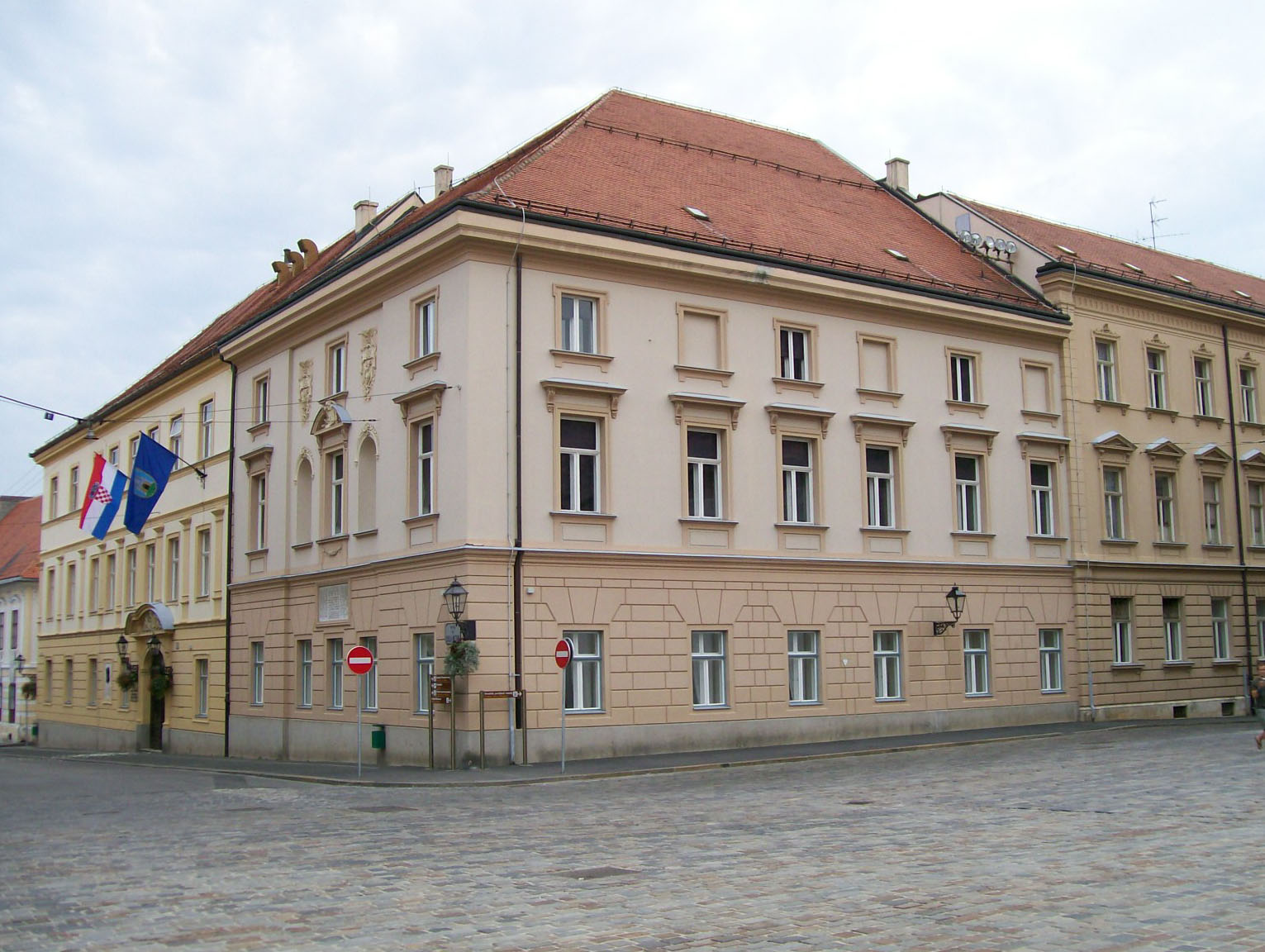
Old City Hall, previously the Theatre on St. Mark's Square

Zagreb's first purpose-built city theatre was Stanković's Theatre (also known as the Old Theatre or the Theatre on St. Mark's Square). It was built by the merchant Kristofor Stanković, who had won 30,000 ducats in the Vienna lottery in 1833. He intended to rent the building to foreign companies, and it also contained a ballroom, which hosted a number of important sessions of the Parliament of Croatia.

The builders were father and son, Christofor and Anton Cragnolini. The theatre was designed with three rows of boxes surrounding the auditorium, and could accommodate more than 750 patrons. The stage covered approximately 200 m^{2}, and at the same time served as a storage for the scenery backdrops. The orchestra was placed on a level with the audience. Lighting was originally candles, then from 1864 by gaslight, and after 1894 by electricity.

The first play, Körner's play Niklas Graf von Zriny, was performed by a German troupe on October 4, 1834. German and Italian theatrical troupes performed, but beginning in 1860, only Croatian plays were performed. Croatian was first heard in the theatre during an intermezzo of a German production, when Ljudevit Gaj's reveille "Još Hrvatska ni propala" was performed, and the first play in Croatian, the Juran and Sofia or The Turks under Sisak: Heroic Play in Three Acts (Juran i Sofia ili Turci kod Siska: junačka igra u trih činih) by Ivan Kukuljević Sakcinski, was performed there on 10 June 1840. The first Croatian opera, Love and Malice (Ljubav i zloba) by Vatroslav Lisinski, was also performed there on 28 March 1846.

Dimitrije Demeter, author of the patriotic epic "Grobničko polje" (Grobnik Plain) in 1842, laid the foundation for a new Croatian theatre, as manager and writer. His most important dramatic work "Teuta" (1844) draws on Illyrian history. Other writers of the time are Antun Nemčić, author of a drama called "Kvas bez kruha" (Yeast without bread). Ivan Kukuljević Sakcinski was a politician, scientist, historian, and the first writer of plays based on more recent Croatian literature: "Juran i Sofija" (1839).

The old theatre building was badly damaged in the great earthquake of 1880, and in 1881 the Croatian Parliament voted to construct a new theatre. The last performance was held in the old theatre on June 16, 1895. After the interior was renovated in 1895, the building was given a new administrative purpose as the City Hall, while the theatre moved to the new Fellner-Helmer building in the lower town that we know today as the Croatian National Theatre.

In the late 19th century, Ivo Vojnović captivated the public with plays such as "Ekvinocij" (Equinox, 1895). Although his early works dealt with cosmopolitan themes, Dubrovnik remained his major inspiration especially in "Dubrovačka trilogija" (Dubrovnik Trilogy, 1903). In that work, the subject relates to realism, although the technique and inspiration is entirely modernist.

Two other very successful playwrights of the time were Milan Ogrizović and Josip Kosor. Ogrizović used themes from folk songs in works such as ("Hasanaginica"), and he also wrote passionate dramas ("Vučina", 1921), while Kosor is best known for his dramatic "Požar strasti" (Fire of Passion, 1912).

=== Modern times ===
The growth of theatrical art in Croatia entailed the opening of new theatre venues throughout the 20th century, many of them within the adapted buildings of former cinemas and cultural centres. This trend continued to the end of the 20th and beginning of the 21st century, when several new theatre venues were opened in Zagreb (Small Stage Theatre, EXIT Theatre, Histrion House), and a number of existing venues have been reconstructed and adapted.

== Theatres and theatrical companies ==
The Croatian National Theatre and other theatres around Croatia.

=== Croatian National Theatre ===
Croatian National Theatre (Croatian: Hrvatsko narodno kazalište) is the official name of all the state-funded theatre houses in Croatia. Each one is commonly referred to by the Croatian-language initials HNK. The Croatian National Theatre was established in 1860, and in 1861 it gained government support putting it on par with many other European national theatres. As part of that, new theatres were built in Zadar (1865), Dubrovnik (1865), Osijek (1866), Šibenik (1870), Varaždin (1873), Rijeka (1885) and Split (1893). The theatre buildings in the biggest cities (Zagreb, Split, Rijeka, Osijek and Varaždin) are considered the premier theatre and opera houses in the country.

==== Croatian National Theatre in Zagreb ====
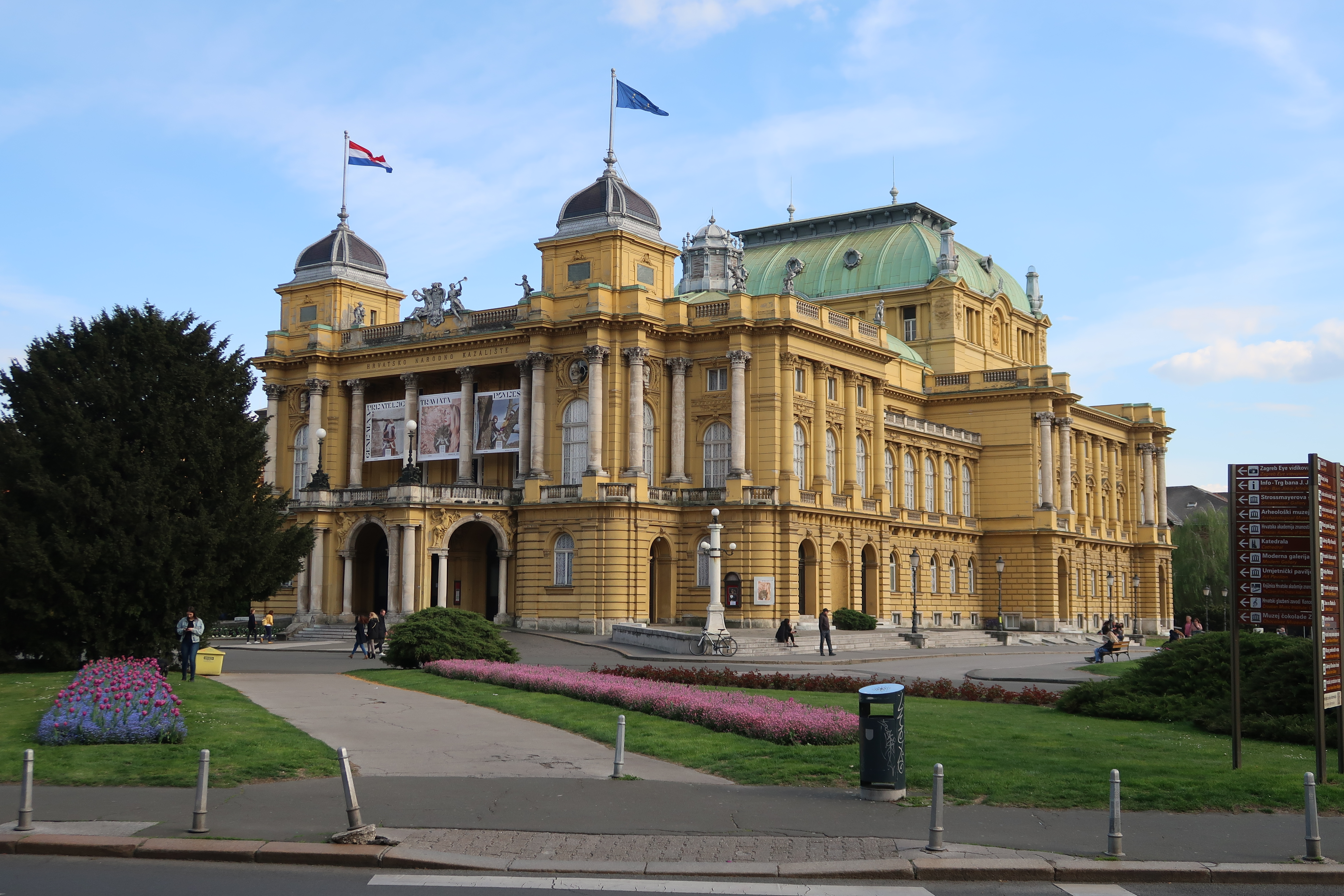
Croatian National Theatre in Zagreb in 2018

With the increasing demands on Zagreb's old theatre in St Mark's Square, it was decided to build a larger theatre to accommodate the new artistic and technical requirements. So in 1895 the Croatian National Theatre moved to a new purpose-built building on Republic of Croatia Square in Zagreb's Lower Town, where it is based today. The Austro-Hungarian emperor Franz Joseph I was at the unveiling of this new building during his visit to the city in 1895. The new building was the project of famed Viennese architects Ferdinand Fellner and Herman Helmer, whose firm had built several theatres in Vienna. Celebrations marking the 100th anniversary of the building were held on October 14, 1995.

The auditorium has seating for 809 patrons, including the parterre, two tiers of boxes and a balcony. The Croatian National Theatre has three ensembles: a drama company founded in 1860, opera established in 1870, and ballet first formed in 1894. In principle, the drama and opera repertoires are focused on classical pieces and well-known pieces by contemporary authors. The ballet ensemble also leans towards a more classical repertoire, but also sometimes includes contemporary dance.

==== Croatian National Theatre in Split ====
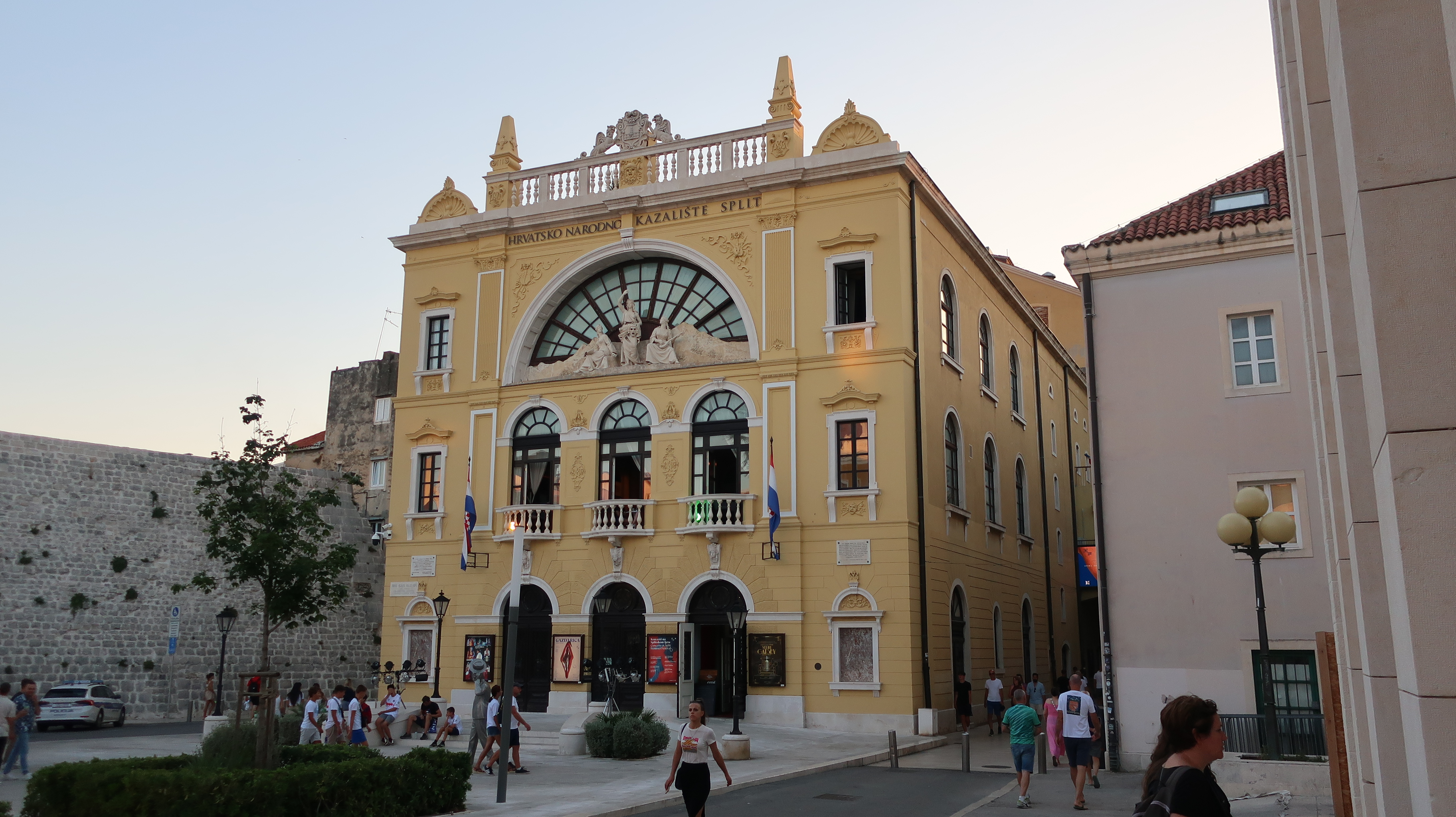
Croatian National Theatre in Split

Originally opened in 1893, the Croatian National Theatre in Split is owned and operated by the City of Split and is one of the oldest surviving theatres in Dalmatia. When first opened, the auditorium that could accommodate 1,000 with three tiers of boxes, a gallery and parterre circle. The building was designed by Emilio Veccietti and Ante Bezić, whose approach was that of historical eclecticism. Following a fire in 1970, major renovations were need to reconstruct parts of the original building (the front façade, the atrium, and the foyer) while a new west wing was added. The main theatre now has seating for 660, and there is an additional chamber stage, called Stage 55 (Scena 55).

After an initial attempt to establish a theatrical company in 1898, it was not until 1920 that Split's first professional ensemble was founded. Although it only ran for 8 years, the drama and opera ensembles resumed again in 1945, and in 1952 they were joined by a ballet ensemble. Today all three produce rich and diverse repertoires, both classical and contemporary. The drama and the opera ensembles are particularly dedicated to working with authors from the Mediterranean cultural scene.

Since 1954, the Croatian National Theatre has been organizing the Split Summer Festival, with productions by all three ensembles contributing to the festival's program. Also, since 1992, the Croatian National Theatre in Split has been organizing Marulić Days – Festival of Croatian Drama.

==== Croatian National Theatre in Rijeka ====
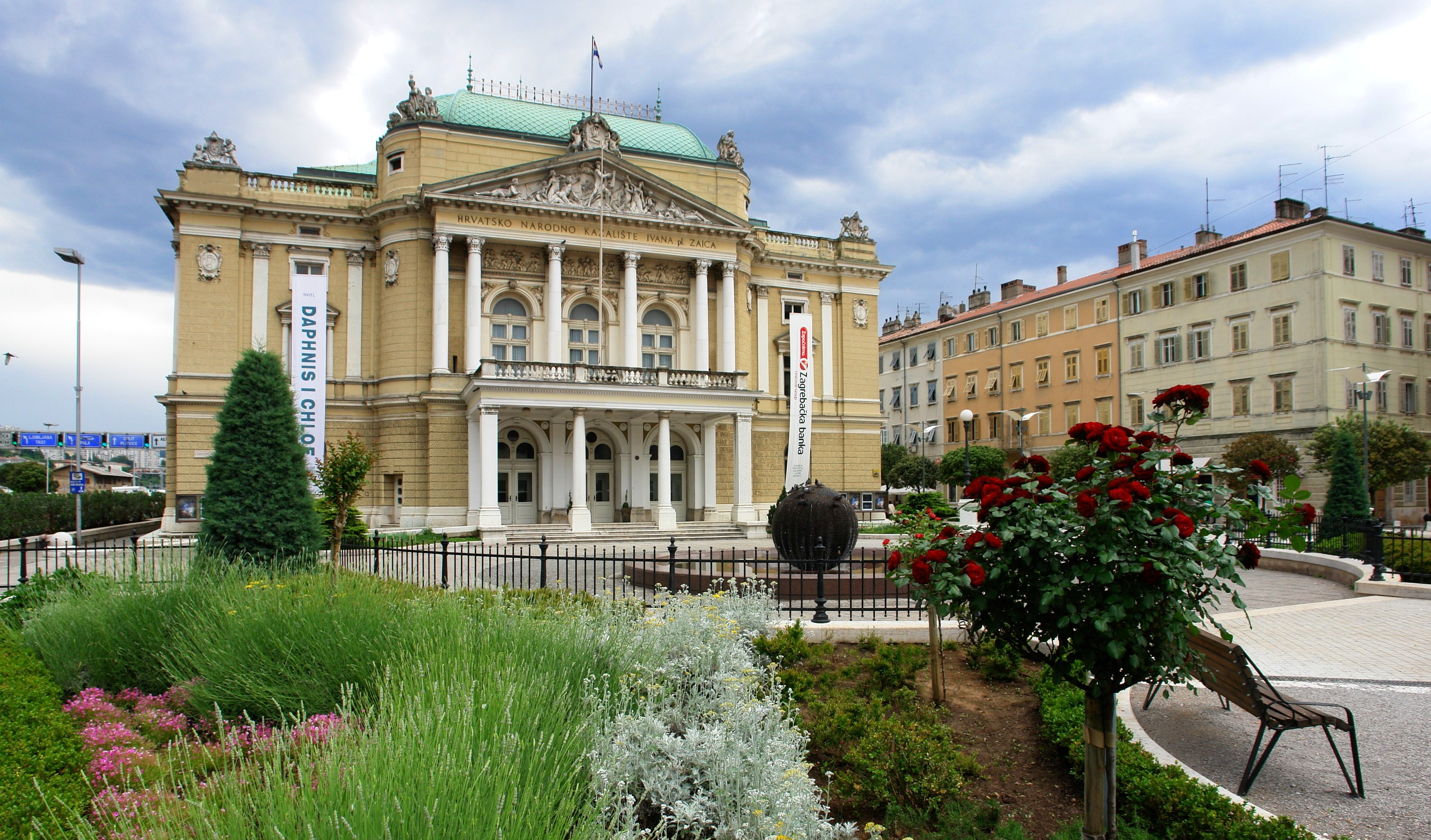
Croatian National Theatre in Rijeka

The building of the Croatian National Theatre in Rijeka was designed by renowned Viennese architects Ferdinand Fellner and Hermann Helmer, and opened in 1885. The exterior of this luxurious theatre building featured a renaissance style façade with six columns and gable roof, while the interior was designed in a late-baroque style. The main theatre contains a parterre, three tiers of boxes and a balcony, providing seating for 600. The building was completely renovated in the 1970s.

For the first 60 years, the venue mainly hosted visiting theatrical troupes, primarily for opera performances. Then in 1946, the building gained its own resident Croatian and Italian drama, opera and ballet ensembles. All provide an extensive and diverse repertoire, including domestic and international classics from literature and music, contemporary pieces right up to a lighter entertainment productions. In 2004 the theatre became a co-organizer of the Rijeka Summer Festival.

==== Croatian National Theatre in Osijek ====
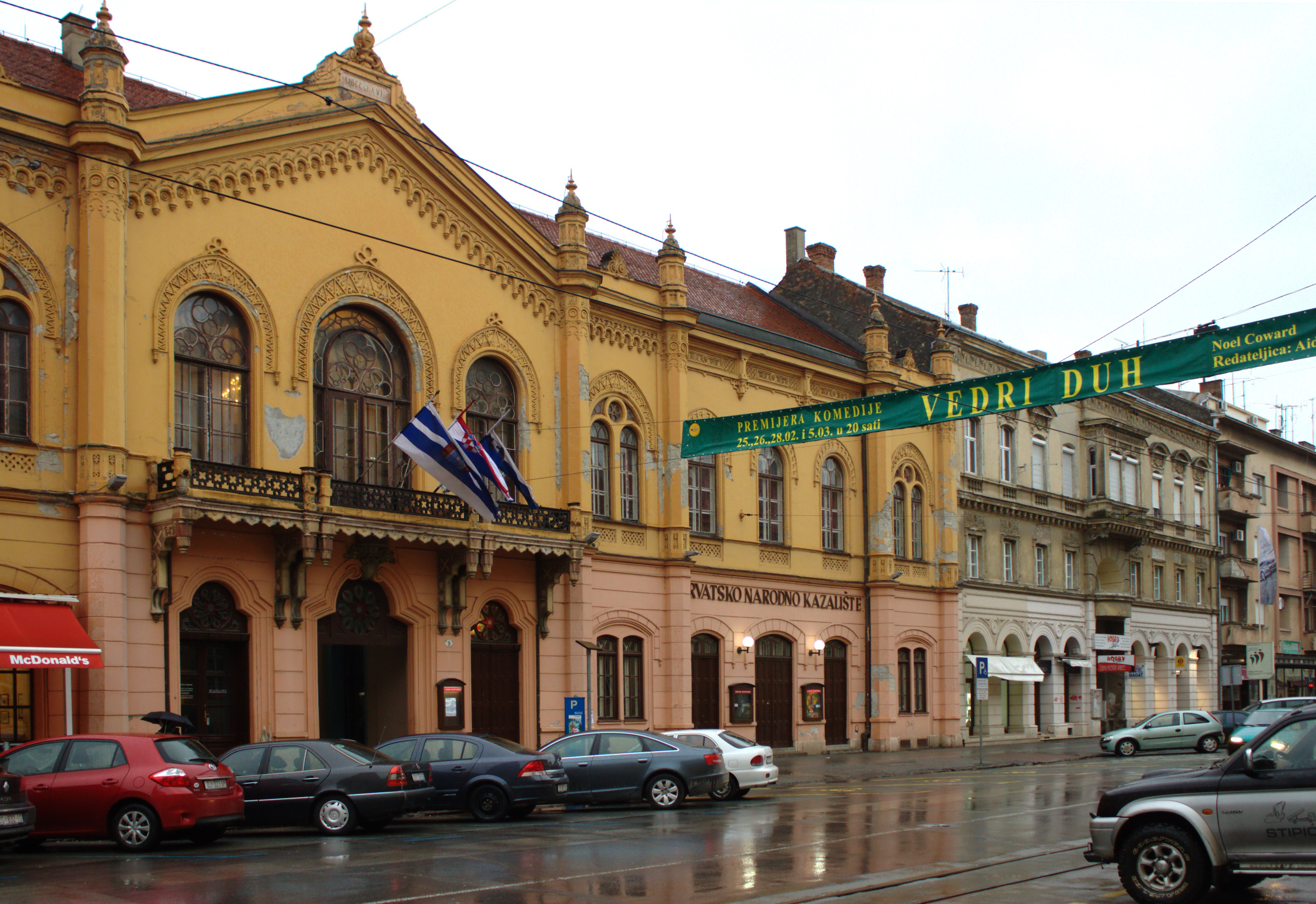
Croatian National Theatre in Osijek

The Croatian National Theatre in Osijek was designed by Karl Krausner and built in 1866 in a in historic style with elements of Moorish architecture. The building originally also housed a casino and ballroom on the first floor. With the establishment of a professional theatrical ensemble in 1907, there were plans for a new building to accommodate their needs. This never happened, and despite several attempts at reconstruction, it was only in 1945 when the casino and a wing of the neighbouring hotel became available that the existing venue was able to support their needs. Following severe damage in the homeland war of 1992–1994, the building was again completely reconstructed. Today, the horse-shoe shaped auditorium contains a parterre and three tiers of boxes and provides seating for 420 patrons.

Since its founding in 1907, the theatrical company has maintained diverse drama and music repertoires, which they often take on tour. They are the second largest national theatre ensemble, and as of 2005, the theatre also houses a permanent dance group.

==== Croatian National Theatre in Varaždin ====
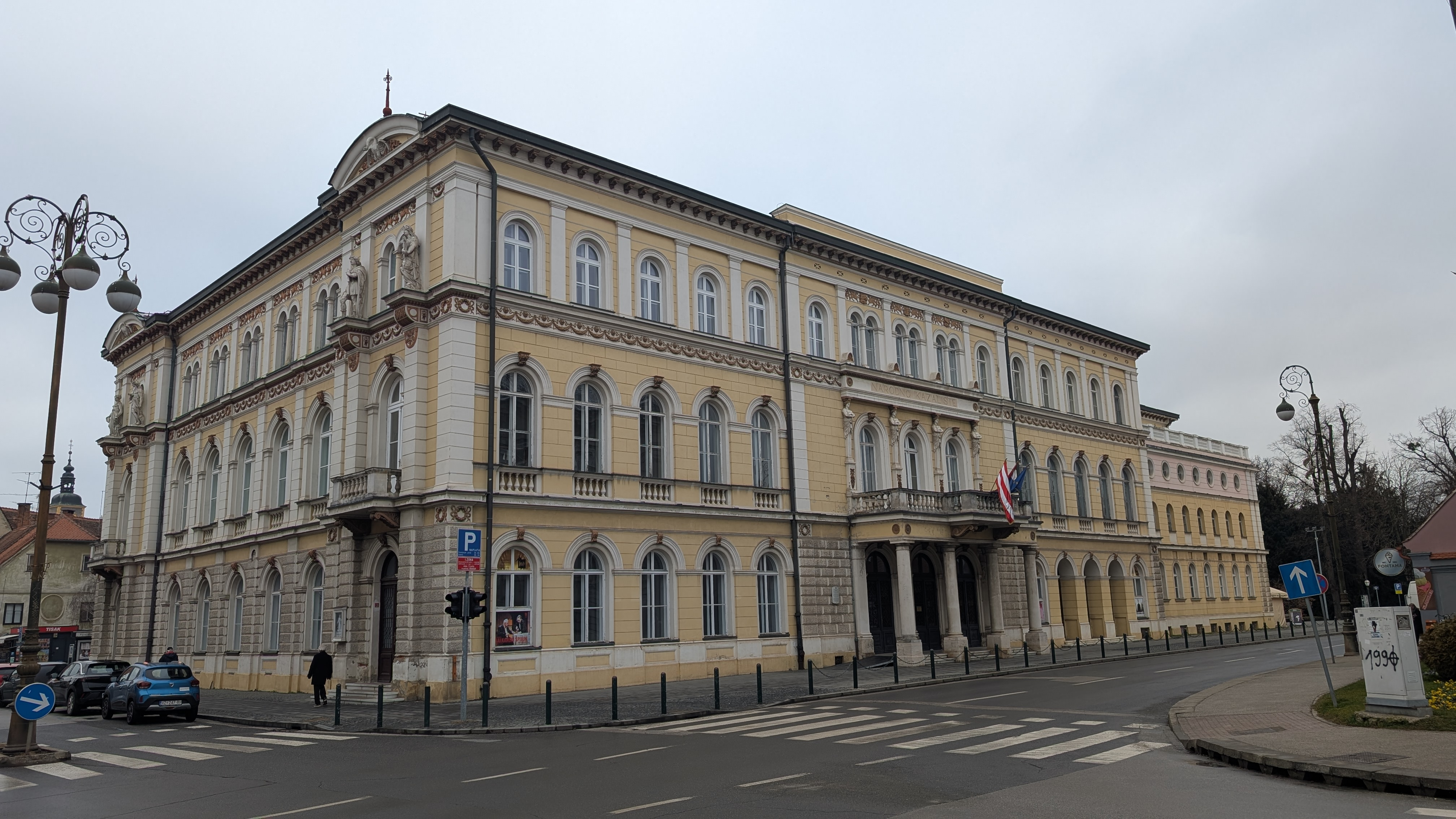
Croatian National Theatre in Varaždin

The Croatian National Theatre in Varaždin was built in 1873 by Zagreb-based builder Janko Jambrišak according to the awarded design by Viennese architect, Hermann Helmer, who also personally supervised the construction. This was his first theatre project, and together with Ferdinand Fellner, he would go on to build fifty theatres across Europe between 1873 and 1916. With its harmonious neo-renaissance façade, the building was designed to serve as both a theatre and concert hall. The central theatre hall has a 370-seat auditorium with a parterre, two tiers of boxes and a balcony. The building also houses a separate concert hall and a small chamber hall in the basement, which was added in 1956. The Varaždin theatre housed its first theatre company in 1915–1923, and the Croatian National Theatre was established in 1945. The theatre maintains a diverse repertoire with a special focus on premieres of new pieces written by Croatian playwrights, as well as pieces written by authors from Central Europe. A specialty of the theatre is its adaptations of classical pieces in the local dialect and at times experimental theatre. On top of maintaining a standard repertoire, the Croatian National Theatre also permanently produces puppet and children's theatre pieces

==== Croatian National Theatre in Šibenik ====
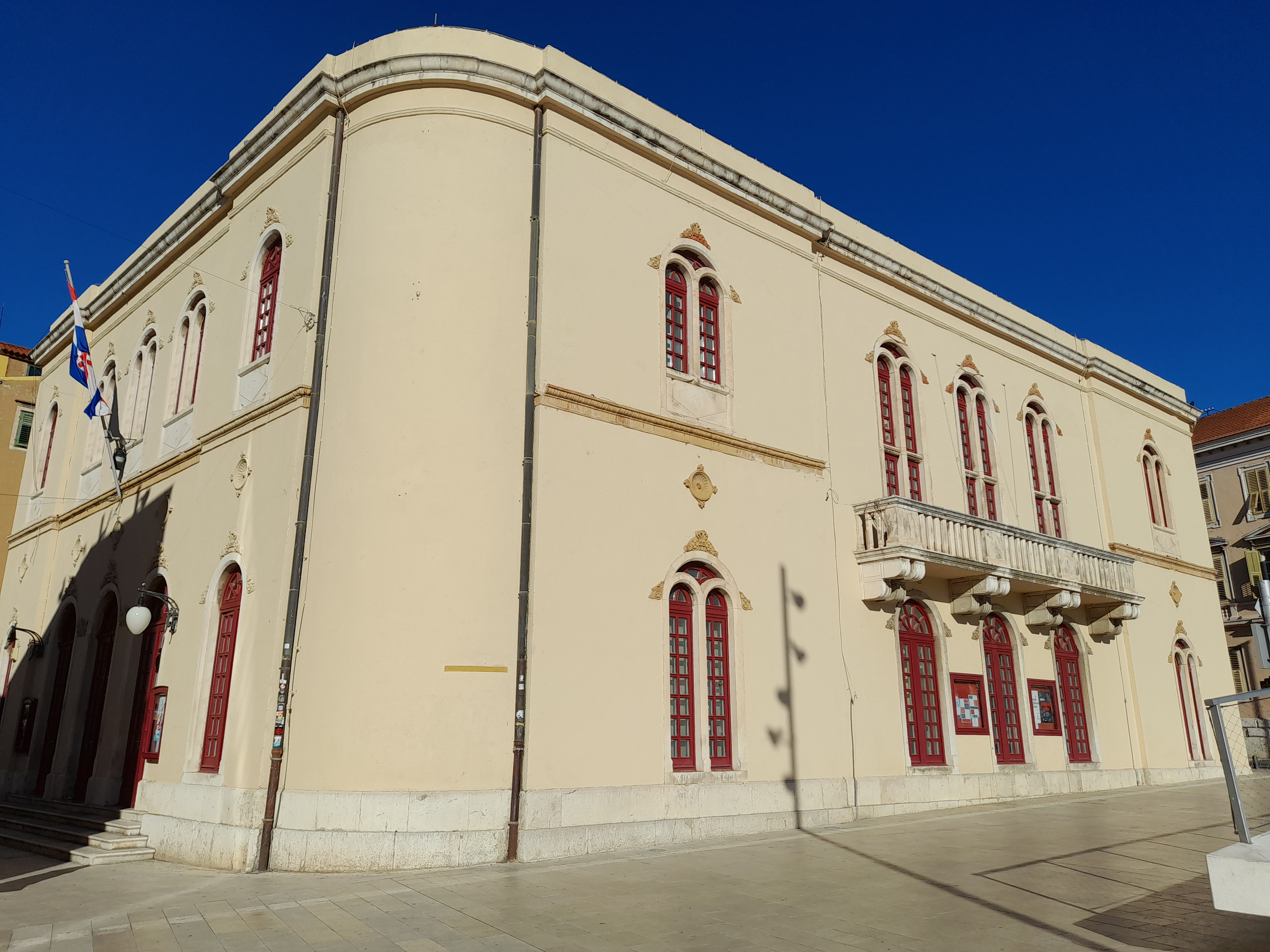
Croatian National Theatre in Šibenik

The Croatian National Theatre in Šibenik was opened in 1870, financed and built by local citizens through the Šibenik Theatre Society, which was set up for the purpose in 1864. The auditorium follows the plan of the Teatro Fenice in Venice, while the architectural style is an eclectic mix of renaissance, romanic and gothic features as designed by Josip Slade from Trogir. Decorative elements in the main hall include allegoric scenes and figures of prominent citizens of Šibenik at the time. In the mid-20th century a long stone balcony was added to the eastern facade. Following severe damage in the homeland war in 1991, the theatre had to undergo a major reconstruction. The theatre hall presently has a parterre and three tiers of boxes with a 310-seat capacity. From 1945 to 1964, the Šibenik Theatre was home to an ensemble of the National Theatre Company which produced both drama and operetta repertoire. The venue has now a semi-professional ensemble, and serves as host for visiting performances.

==== Croatian National Theatre in Zadar ====
The Croatian National Theatre in Zadar was initially built in 1783 as the Teatro Nobile (Nobleman's Theatre). It was outfitted finely with an orchestra pit, parterre and four tiers of boxes. However, it was closed down in 1882, as it did not have an adequate fire system. The run-down building was later purchased by entrepreneur Aldo Meštović, who opened up a 1000-seat movie and variety theatre in 1924. Damaged by an air-strikes during the second world war, it underwent a major re-construction with a completely new theatre space, with its first professional drama ensemble. After further renovations over the years, the large hall now seats 650 patrons. The theatre has served mainly as a host venue for visiting drama and opera groups, but is gradually once again building up its own professional drama company.

=== City and regional theatres ===
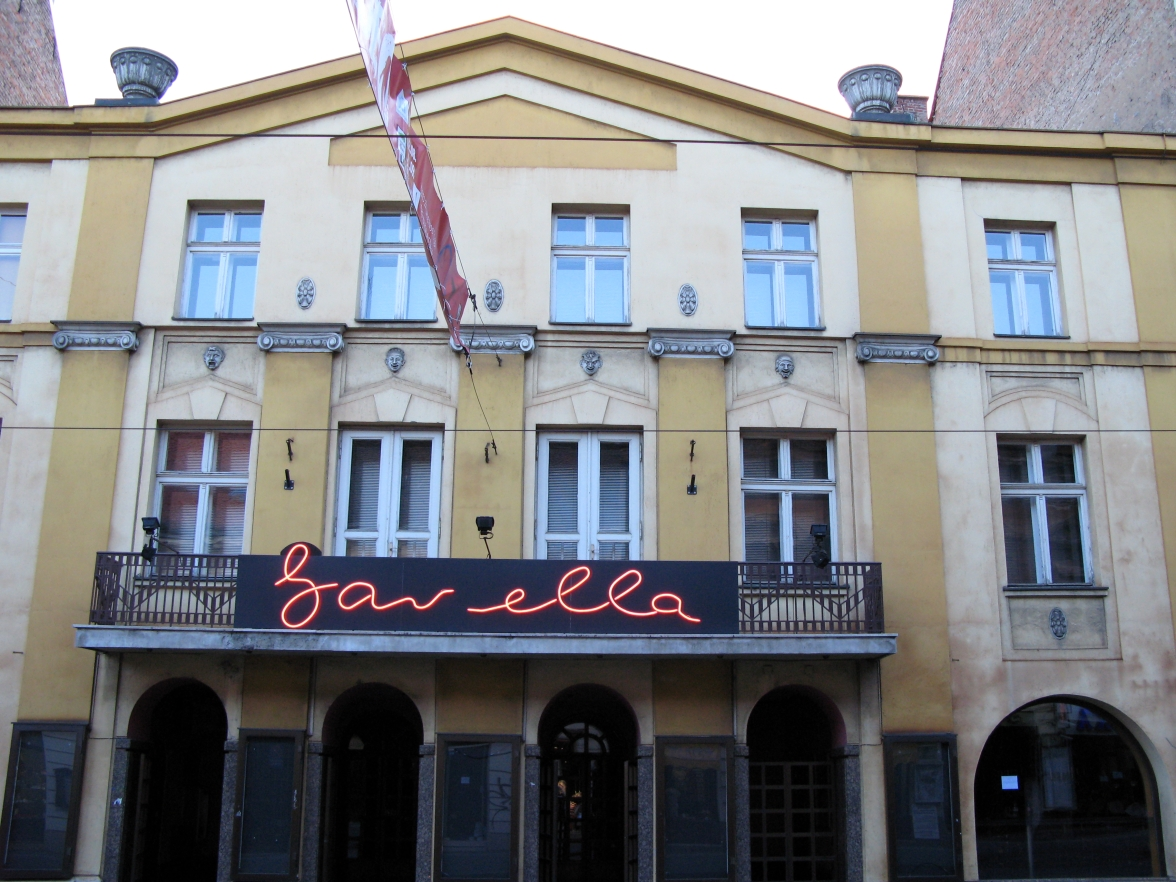
Gavella Theatre

- Gavella Drama Theatre in Zagreb was established in 1953 under the name Zagreb Drama Theatre. Comprising a set of young actors and directors under Branko Gavella, it was intended to be a second city theatre, creating a counter-point to the mainstream Croatian National Theatre. The venue was originally built in 1916 as the Helios Cinema, then operated for a number of years as the Small Theatre, a second stage for the Croatian National Theatre. Following the most recent renovation in 1995, the theatre has a total of 389 seats on the floor and balcony. The company and the theatre are now known as the Gavella Drama Theatre. The theatre's repertoire is based on reinterpretations of classical drama pieces and contemporary pieces by both domestic and foreign authors. The theatre also hosts the Gavella Nights Festival, featuring a selection of the season's best productions from other Croatian theatres.
- The Kerempuh Satirical Theatre in Zagreb was originally founded in 1964, merging with the Varijete stage in 1971, thus gaining its own venue and ensemble. Their repertoire focuses mainly on classical and contemporary pieces that have a satirical content. In 1994 the theatre was named for Petrica Kerempuh, the traditional folk jester/wise character from Croatian popular literature. The Kerempuh building dates from 1912, and was originally a cinema (Apollo, and later Croatia), converted to a theatre venue. The latest renovation in 1988 created a modern 519-seat auditorium, with a ground floor foyer, known as the Night Stage, where performances may take place.
- &TD Theatre in Zagreb is an independent theatre with a permanent ensemble that operates within the Zagreb University Student Centre. &TD stands for "i tako dalje" meaning "Etc" "and so on". The &TD is known for taking on provocative and challenging contemporary works, open to experimentation and different artistic practices. Its audience tend to be mainly students and young intellectuals and it has recently opened up to supporting independent artistic projects and groups.
- Histrion House, Zagreb is home to the Histrion Theatre Company, which was formed in 1975. Their repertoire maintains a tradition of popular theatre, simple in expression, rich in improvisation and grotesque. The company has toured extensively within Croatia, and since 1986 has performed on the summer stage of Zagreb's Opatovina Park (known as Zagreb’sHistrion Summer Festival) The Histrion building started life as a cinema (Olimp, Kozara and Apolo) and is famous for being the place that presented the first sound motion picture in Croatia in 1929. The modern theatre has seating for 230, and opened in 2007.

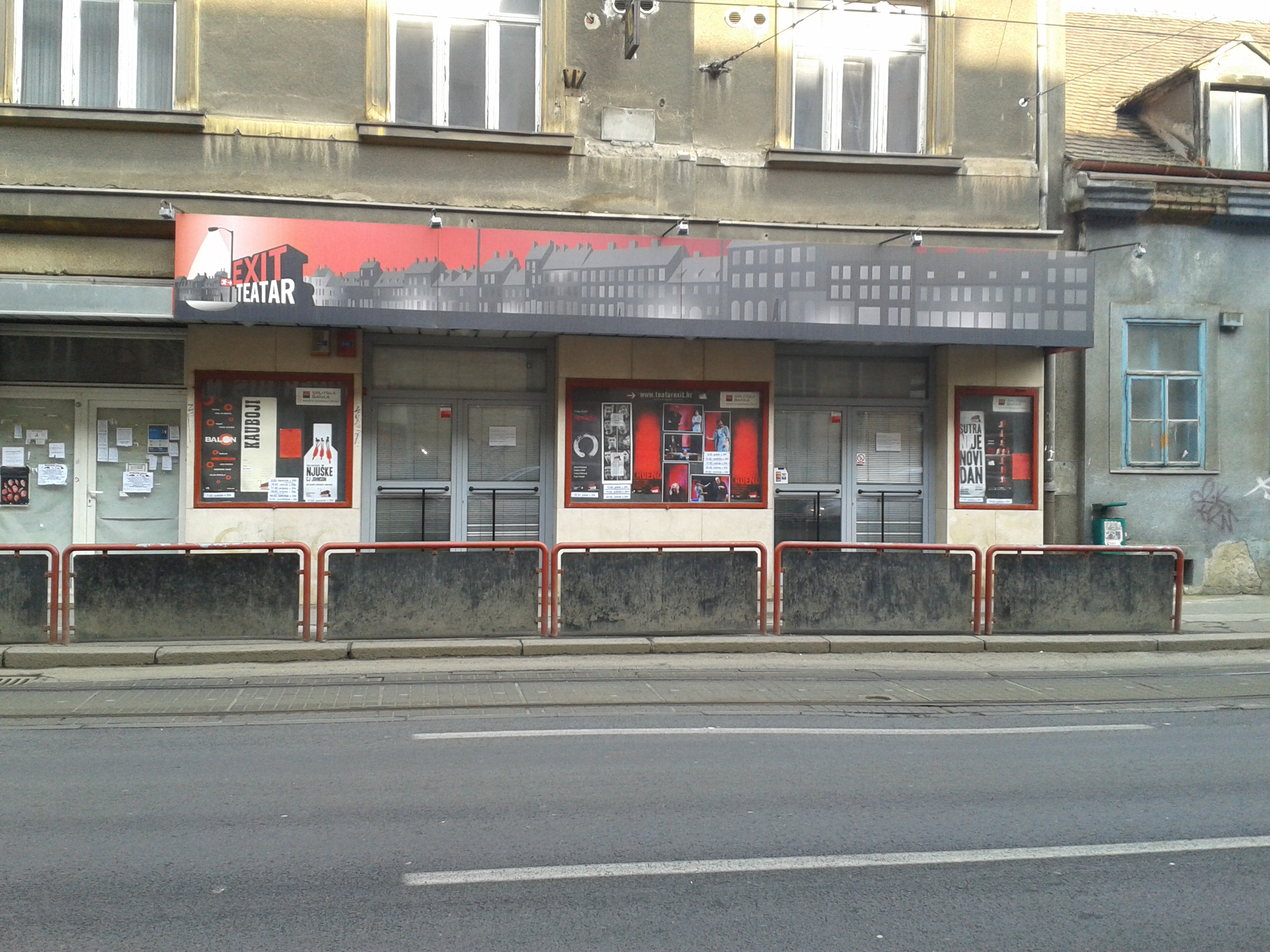
Exit theatre

- Exit Theatre in Zagreb is an independent theatre without a resident ensemble, founded in 1994. It is known for its contemporary repertoire and diversity of theatre practices, much of it experimental, where the actor often takes on all aspects of creating a performance. The 300-seat theatre is part of the renovated former Cultural Centre “August Cesarec”.
- Istarsko Narodno Kazaliste Istrian National Theatre (INK): City Theatre Pula. The theatre building in Pula was designed by architect Rugger Berlam and built in 1880. It was initially named Politeama Ciscutti after the entrepreneur and financier of the building, Pietro Ciscutti. Over the following decades, it hosted a variety of programs, including music and theatre events, entertainment programs, sports events and film screenings. The 800-seat auditorium consisted of a parterre, two tiers of boxes, a balcony and gallery. The National Theatre was established in 1948, in the Politeami Ciscutti, and in 1956 became known as the Istrian National Theatre. At the same time, a permanent ensemble was formed, and in the 1990s a drama studio added.
- Hrvatski Kulturni Dom (Croatian House of Culture) HKD, Rijeka, is a 530-seat theatre set within a modern building that also houses a hotel and cafe. It was designed by architects Josip Pičman and Alfred Albini and completed in 1948. The repertoire includes visiting theatrical performances, as well as productions of local independent theatre and dance companies from Rijeka. The permanent HKD company was founded in 1993, known for its contemporary drama repertoire and radical interpretations of classics. As of 1994, the HKD Theatre Company has hosted and organized the International Small Stage Festival, and the majority of programs take place in the Croatian House of Culture.
- Teatro Fenice in Rijeka, opened in 1914, was designed by Theodor Träxler and Eugenio Celligoi as one of the first large theatres in Europe with bearing surfaces made out of reinforced concrete. Such construction allowed the building of two large halls one on top of the other, with a joint capacity of 2000 seats. The Main Hall was technically well-equipped and was the first theatre in Croatia to have a flying system along with wind and rain machines. The venue hosted a variety of performances, vaudeville pieces and circus shows, concerts, balls, exhibitions and motion picture screenings. The Teatro Fenice is not currently used, but is on the List of Protected Cultural Heritage in the Register of Cultural Heritage of the Republic of Croatia.

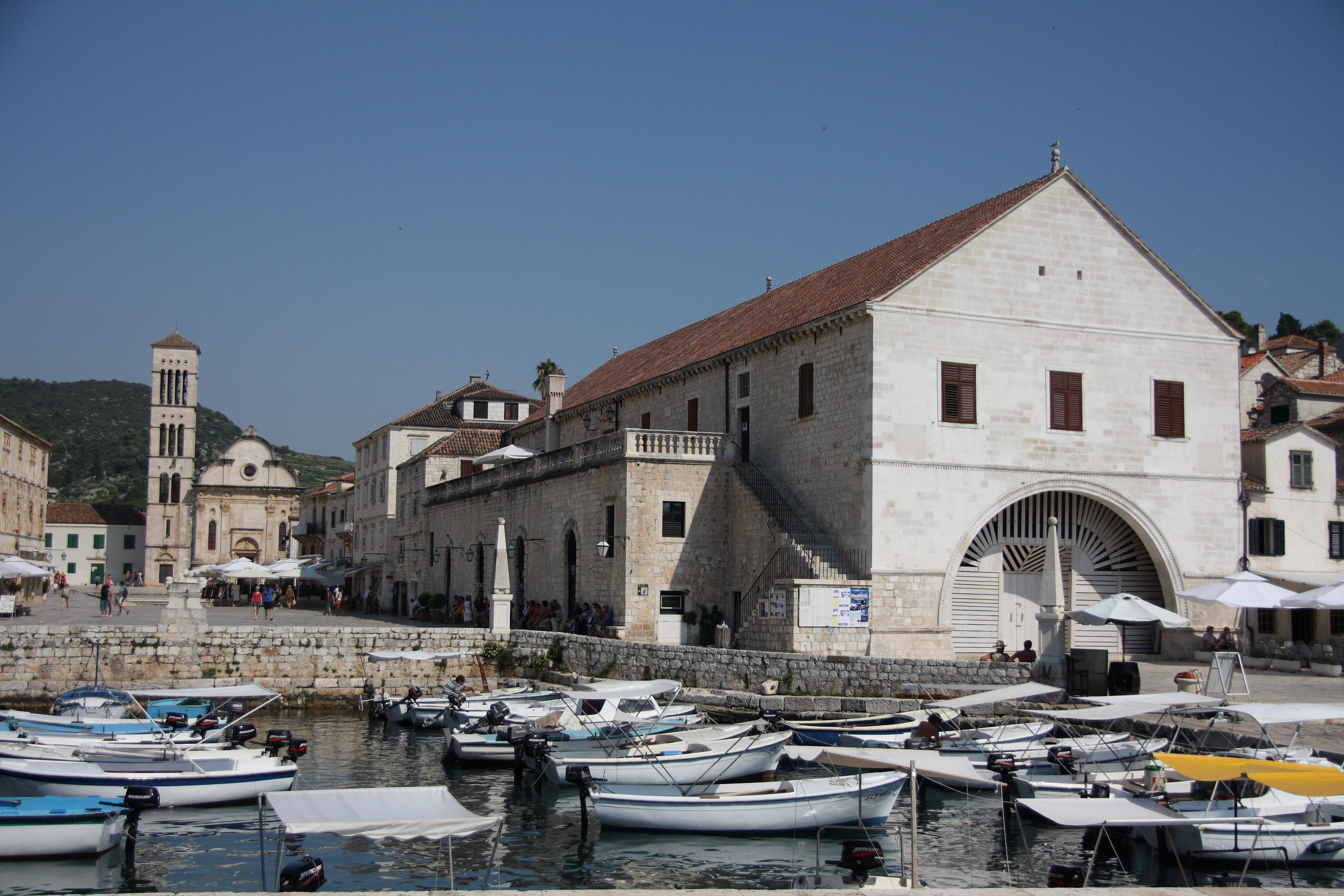
Hvar arsenal

- The historical Hvar Theatre is located on the first floor of the Arsenal building, added in 1612 as part of extensive renovations. It is the first communal theatre in Europe, earlier ones having been privately owned and built. The first records we have of performances held in the Hvar Theatre date back to 1676. The current layout of the interior dates from the mid 19th century, and the floor and ceiling decorations added in 1900. The stage is relatively compact, and close to the audience, making for an intimate venue. The auditorium can seat around 160 in a pit area and two tiers of narrow boxes. The rear wall of the stage is decorated with a fresco painting of an unidentified town, painted in 1819 as part of a universal set design for performances. During the 19th century, there were over 30 drama plays and operas presented in a single season. In addition to visiting companies, coming mainly from Italy, the Hvar Theatre was also the artistic home to domestic amateur groups, such as the local Hvar Popular Theatre. The latest renovation and conservation project won a Europe Nostra Award in 2020.
- Marin Držić Theatre in Dubrovnik, opened in 1865, was the first purpose-built theatre venue in the city. It was known as Bonda's Theatre after the organizer and main funder for the project, nobleman Luko Bonda (Bundić). The theatre was designed by Emil Vecchietti in a neo-renaissance style, and located within the walls of the old town. The 370-seat auditorium follows the design of the “sala a l’italiana” with a parterre and three tiers of boxes. On the ceiling is a painting by Vlaho Bukovac. As part of a major reconstruction in 1989, a 70-seat black box stage was added, known as the Bursa Theatre. In addition to hosting domestic and Italian theatre companies and presenting the work of Dubrovnik-affiliated amateurs, Bonda's Theatre also hosted a diverse range of other cultural and entertainment events, such as concerts, lectures and film screenings. The theatre's first professional ensemble was founded during the second world war and since 1945 the building has been home to the National Theatre. In 1967 the theatre was renamed Marin Držić for one of the leading European renaissance comedy playwrights and citizens of Dubrovnik. The theatre's professional ensemble is dedicated to playing adiverse drama repertoire, especially including pieces from the Mediterranean cultural milieu and those revitalizing the rich literary and theatre heritage of Dubrovnik.

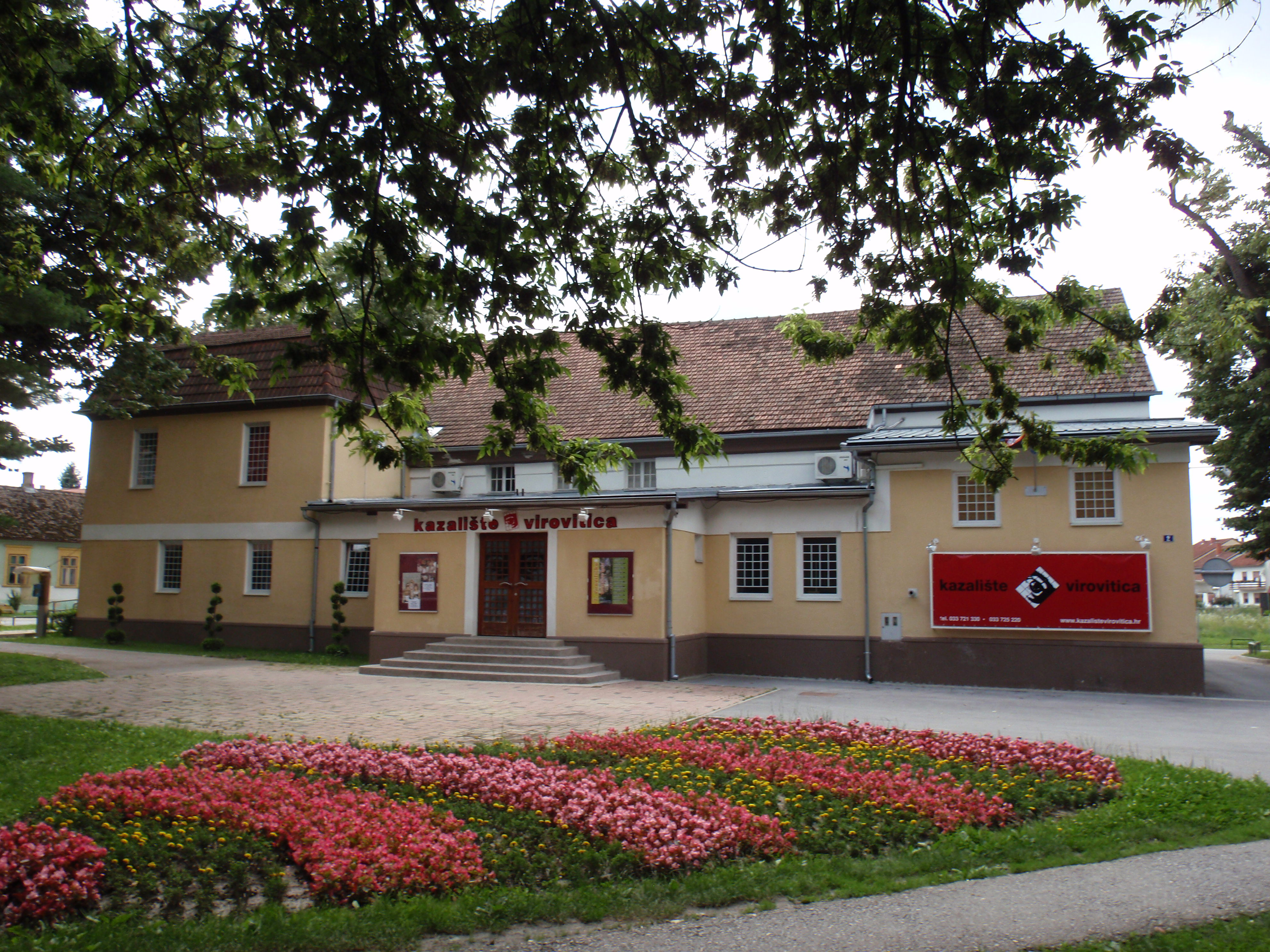
Virovitica Theatre

- Virovitica Theatre, Virovitica is housed in the former Croatian House, built in 1927-1929 thanks to voluntary donations by citizens. It hosted a variety of entertainment programs and even sports events, and a group of amateur theatricals. In 1954 it became solely a theatre venue and has been modernized and adapted with an expanded stage and an auditorium that seats 300 patrons. Unique among Croatian contemporary theatres, the Virovitica Theatre came into existence due to the dedicated work of its theatre amateurs. The first professional members were employed in 1948 and at the beginning of the 1950s started to engage professional theatre directors for its productions. Today, the Virovitica Theatre has a permanent ensemble of ten actors and a diverse repertoire for a multi-generational audience
- Požega City Theatre, Požega is located in the central town square in a one-storey brick building which was built in the mid 19th century. In 1895, the building was re-adapted into a hotel with a representative ballroom which in time started serving predominantly as a theatre venue. From 1948 to 1957 the venue also had a professional theatre ensemble. The long abandoned and burnt-down building hall was renovated and expanded in 1988. Today it can hold 230 visitors and is the permanent stage of the Požega City Theatre (founded in 1995). In addition to theatre workshops and amateur productions, the City Theatre occasionally produces performances with visiting professional actors.

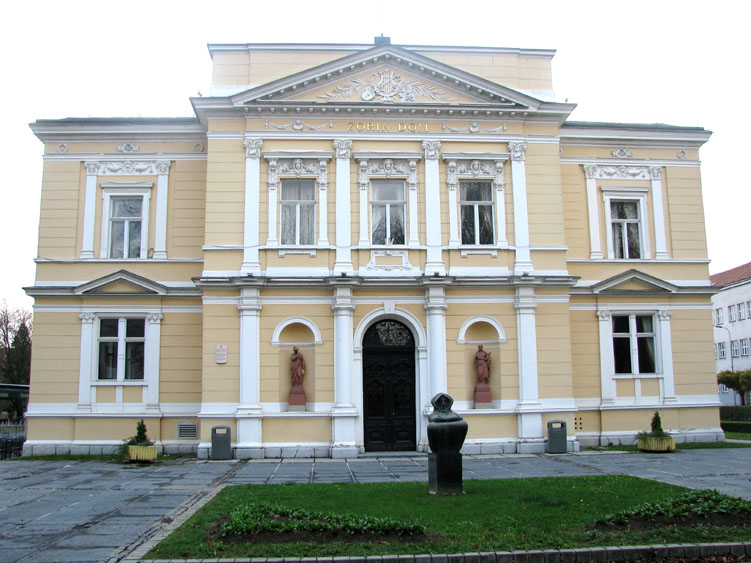
Zorin dom, Karlovac

- Zorin Dom (Zora's House) in Karlovac is a neo-renaissance building dating from 1892 belonging to the First Croatian Singers Association Zora (Dawn). Its initial purpose was to host various social and arts events, as well as being a public library. Designed and built by Gjuro Carnelutti, a Zagreb architect of Italian origin. During the building's renovation in 1987–2000, the art-nouveau interior was restored to its original design and the stage enlarged and modernized. In addition to the large 329-seat theatre, the venue also houses two smaller halls with 120 seats. From its beginnings as a venue for visiting companies, later it also produced drama and opera works given by local amateur dramatic groups. As of 2001, the venue serves as a visiting company theatre and youth centre, and organizes professional theatre productions

=== Comedy ===
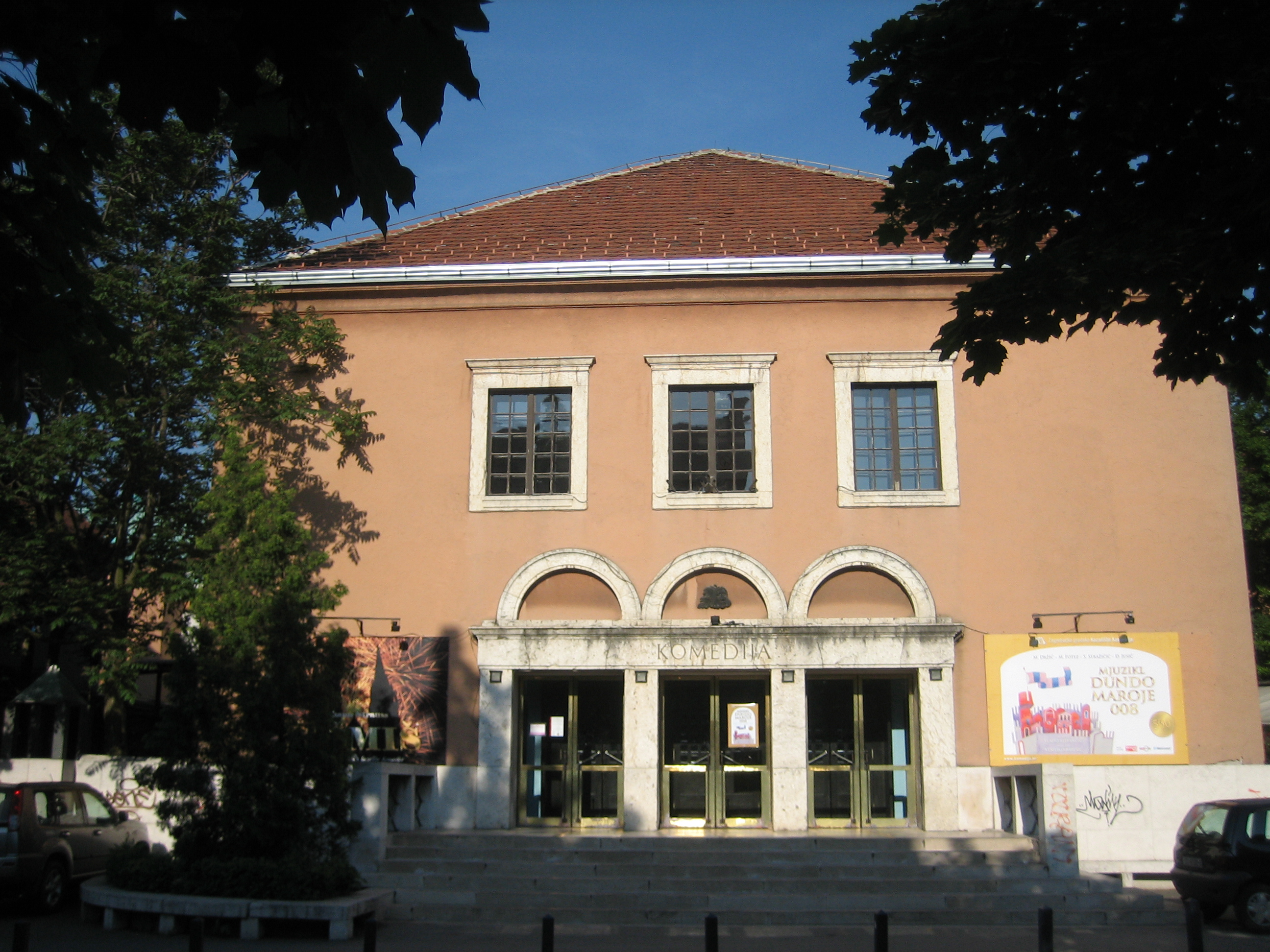
Komedija, Zagreb Comedy Theatre

- Komedija Theatre, the Zagreb Comedy Theatre was founded in 1950 through the merger of the Zagreb Drama Theatre and the Vedran Kerempuh Theatre. Right from the start, the new company has been dedicated to producing both musical pieces and drama plays, mainly comedies. It has developed a reputation for quality operettas and musicals. Along with its resident drama ensemble, the Comedy Theatre has a permanent choir, dance ensemble and orchestra. The Franciscan Hall, which has housed the Comedy Theatre since its beginning, was built in 1938 next to the Franciscan monastery on Kaptol. The venue has seating for 442 patrons, with a parterre and balcony

=== Puppet theatres ===
The first public puppetry performances in Zagreb in Croatian were held from 1916 onwards. The Teatar marioneta (Marionette Theatre) was founded in 1920 by the writer Velimir Deželić, the composer Božidar Širola, the painter and scenographer Ljubo Babić, and the poet Dragutin Domjanić, with the performance of the first Croatian puppet play, Petrica Kerempuh i spametni osel (Petrica Kerempuh and the Clever Donkey).

Between the two world wars, puppetry appeared as a feature within the Sokol (Falcon) movement that had originated in Bohemia. There were some fifteen amateur Sokol theatres in Croatia at that time and all of them used the marionette (string puppet) exclusively. After the Second World War, a network of professional puppet theatres was set up.

From the beginning, the puppet theatres devoted special attention to staging Croatian literature, particularly works by the “Croatian Andersen”, Ivana Brlić-Mažuranić. National puppetry drama is based on plays by authors such as Vladimir Nazor, Radovan Ivšić, Vojmil Rabadan, Milan Čečuk, Borislav Mrkšić, Luko Paljetak, Ivan Bakmaz, and Zlatko Krilić, and is mainly imbued with the spirit and idiom of folk tales

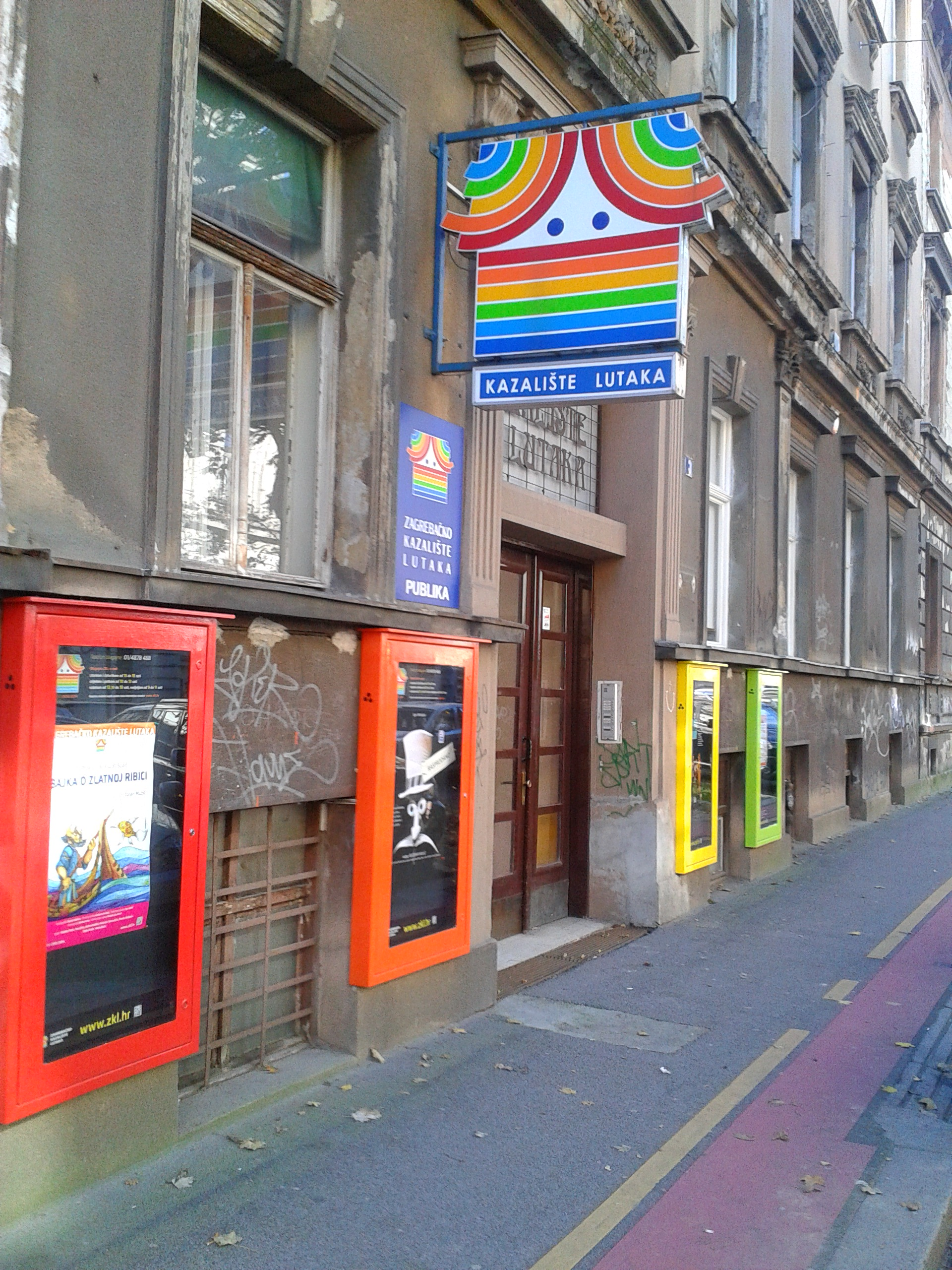
Zagreb Puppet Theatre northern entrance

The International Puppet Festival is held in Zagreb.

- Zagreb Puppet Theatre (ZKL) was founded in 1948, with many well-known puppeteers from Croatia and abroad contributing to its success. The repertoire features a diverse range of techniques and presents a classical and contemporary literature pieces mainly for pre-school and elementary school age children. Since its foundation, the Zagreb Puppet Theatre has been performing in Jerome Hall, built in 1923 by the Croatian Literature Association of St. Jerome's. The latest renovation now provides a modern stage with a tiered auditorium with seating for 240. ZKL hosts a major part of the International Puppet Theatre Festival (end of August and beginning of September), and has published the puppet theatre magazine LuKa since 1995.
- City Puppet Theatre, Split was founded in 1945 as the Pioneer Puppet Theatre, following the traditions of the pre-war Sokol amateur puppet theatre (1933–40). Initially, only string puppets were used, but gradually, other puppets and techniques were introduced. Today, the City Puppet Theatre (renamed in 1991) provides a diverse repertoire using various techniques and artistic expression. Since its foundation it has been resident in the Croatian House building, designed by Kamilo Tomčić and built in 1908 in the Art Nouveau style. The 200-seat theatre hall on the first floor of the building is outfitted with the most up-to-date equipment and adapted for use as a theatre and concert hall
- City Puppet Theatre in Rijeka was founded in 1960, known as Domino until 1993. The theatre is well known for its innovative use of technology and diverse repertoire. The venue of the Rijeka puppeteers originally housed the Teatro Apollo and the Alhambra, with mainly cinema and vaudeville programs, and also served as a music hall. Following a reconstruction in 1996, the theatre features up to date equipment, and the auditorium seats 188 visitors. Starting in 1996, the theatre has organized the Fall Festival of Puppet Theatres, featuring the best puppet performances from Croatia and from abroad
- The Zadar Puppet Theatre was founded in 1951. In addition to providing classical repertoire for the education and entertainment of children, the Zadar Puppet Theatre is known for experimenting with modern visual, technical and performing aspects of puppetry, and has also produced several adult performances based on Croatian and world literature. Construction of a new building began in 1986 within the old town in the Zadar peninsula. It will provide a new modern theatre with an auditorium for between 210 and 470 patrons

=== Children's theatres ===
- Gradsko kazalište Trešnja (Cherry Theatre) in Zagreb was established in 1969 as a children's theatre, with productions mainly for elementary schoolchildren. Its repertoire is based on Croatian and world classics for children and youth, and performances can be quite spectacular with musical and dance elements. They often make use of the "black light" technique to combine puppets and live actors on stage. The building at the former "Maxim Gorki" Cultural Centre, was completely renovated in 2000, and houses a modern performance area with 320 seats, while the exterior features a bright tile-covered facade, cupola and cherry logo.
- Kazalište Mala Scena (Small Stage Theatre) in Zagreb is a private theatre, founded in 1988. Presenting mainly contemporary pieces for children and young people by both foreign and domestic authors. The 160-seat theatre is on the ground floor of a building that had been, at various times an inn, a cafeteria and a local-district community office. The Small Stage Theatre Company is known for its participation in the Milk-Tooth International Festival (1998 to 2004), and for its theatre-related publications.
- Gradsko kazalište Žar ptica (Bird of Fire Theatre) in Zagreb is a children's theatre that provides a wide-ranging repertoire including theatrical pieces, puppet theatre, musicals and choreographed dramas. Initially a touring company, in 1997 they were given the Kozjak Community Centre building, which was adapted into a 220-seat theatre. From 2001, Bird of Fire founded a children's theatre festival, called "Naj, Naj, Naj" (The Best of the Best festival) which has now become an international festival
- Branko Mihaljević Children's Theatre in Osijek was initially an amateur theatre group set up in 1950, developing into a professional company in 1957. The theatre is based in the former Croatian House in Osijek's Lower Town. It was built at the beginning of the 20th century and in addition to the main hall with stage, orchestra pit and 260-seat auditorium, the building also has a rehearsal hall for ballet. Providing a combination of puppet plays and live acting performances, the Children's Theatre Osijek also organises the SLUK festival, featuring a selection of the best Croatian puppet performances that year. In 2006, the theatre was named after Branko Mihaljević (1931–2005), a composer and writer from Osijek

=== Youth theatres ===
- ZeKaeM, the Zagreb Youth Theatre was founded in 1948 as the Zagreb Pioneer Theatre, initially aimed at providing education for children and youth. The professional company was formed in 1967, and following the move into their own building, ZKM has developed a strong reputation of enthusiasm for modern artistic practices and its readiness to take on challenging productions. The repertoire focuses on contemporary drama pieces that engage a diverse, multi-generational audience. In addition to serving as a repertoire theatre, ZKM maintains its educational purpose through acting and dance classes, and is also the organizer of the World Theatre Festival (since 2006). The building of the Zagreb Youth Theatre initially housed (1921) the Music Hall cinema, and later (1949) became the Concert Hall Istria. The main hall provides tiered seating for 283, while the chamber stage has an additional 100 seats.
- Town Youth Theatre, Split evolved out of the cultural and artistic association in 1943 that worked in the Croatian refugee camp in El-Shatt, Egypt. Back in Split, in 1953 it developed into a Children's Theatre named “Tito’s Sailors,” which in 1991 was renamed the Youth Theatre, providing theatrical courses and educational programs for actors. They are located in one of the buildings surrounding Split's Prokurative Square, which used to house the Bajamonti Theatre which opened in 1859 destroyed by fire in 1881. However, the theatre's vestibule has remained largely intact to the present. The Town Youth Theatre is on the first floor with a relatively small stage and seats for an audience of 155. The theatre still maintains theatrical courses for children and youth and it houses a small professional ensemble, which mainly plays a youth repertoire and comedies for adult audiences

=== Theatre of the Blind ===
"New Life" (Croatian: Novi Život) founded in 1948, is the oldest theatre company of blind and visually impaired people in the world. Until 1986, they were the only blind theatrical company in Europe.

The theatrical company of the blind and visually impaired New life gave its first performance on 21 March 1948. The audience showed such appreciation for the performers, that the group decided to continue, forming the first blind theatrical company in Europe. Their mission is to break down prejudices and to raise public awareness about the possibilities and artistic creations of blind and visually impaired people. This includes active participation in the public and cultural life of Croatia through involvement in theatrical arts.

New Life has staged plays by many famous national and foreign playwrights. In the last five years, they have focused their attention on the Theatre of the Absurd and surrealism. By giving about 60 performances a year, in addition to opening nights, New Life has become one of the top amateur theatrical groups in Croatia. In addition to performing nationally, they have also toured within Europe, the United States of America and Australia.

Since 1999, the Blind in Theatre (BIT) Festival has been held every two years in Zagreb, attracting blind and visually impaired artists and theatrical groups from all over the world.

== Academy of Drama ==
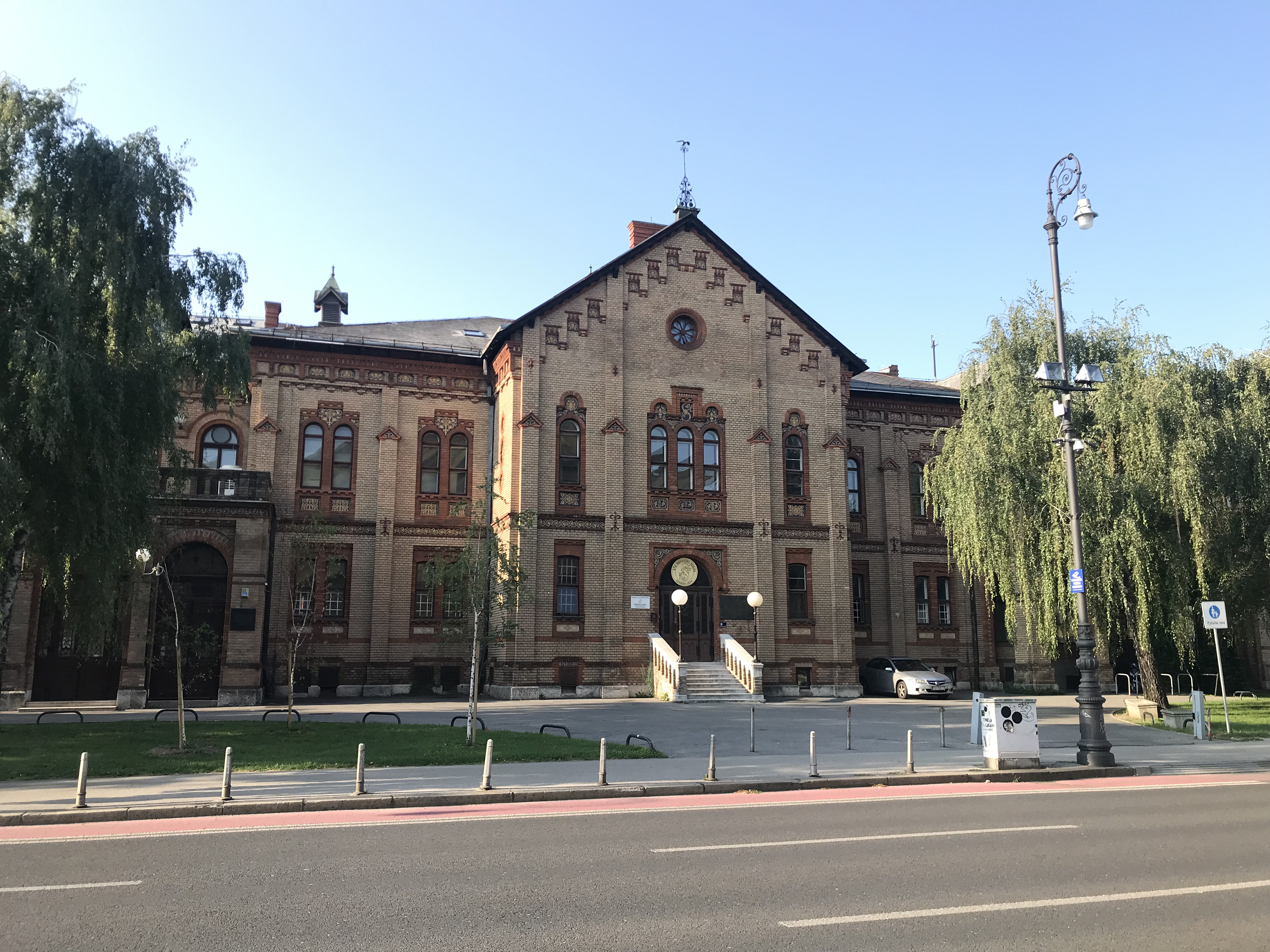
Academy of Dramatic Art in Zagreb

The Academy of Dramatic Art (Croatian: Akademija dramske umjetnosti or ADU) was founded in 1896, growing in prominence resulting in its successful affiliation with the University of Zagreb in 1979. The academy serves as the country's premier drama school, providing education for all types of professions related to theatre, radio, television and film production, including actors, directors, cinematographers and editors.

The need for an academy of drama in Zagreb was first mentioned in the Parliament of Croatia's 1861 theatre legislation which stipulated that a "school for theatre personnel should be formed in Zagreb". However, the modern-day academy traces its roots to the Croatian Drama School (Hrvatska dramatska škola) which was established by Stjepan Miletić in 1896, more than 30 years after the 1861 law. The school was housed in a building at Republic of Croatia Square, which it still occupies today. Up until mid-20th century, its primary role was vocational training of theatre actors. Later, departments for film and television were added. In 1979, it officially became part of the University of Zagreb.

== Croatian Association of Drama Artists ==
The Croatian Association of Drama Artists (Croatian: Hrvatsko Društvo Dramskih Umjetnika or HDDU) is an artistic, non-governmental, non-partisan and non-profit organization that acts as an umbrella association for expert artistic associations. HDDU has about 1,000 members who are professionally involved in the dramatic arts, life and audiovisual performing. The majority of members (about 75%) are actors, while the rest are stage directors, playwrights, drama writers and scriptwriters, costume designers, stage designers, puppet designers, score composers, light designers and theatre producers. These artists are members of 32 professional theatres throughout Croatia as well as in many private theatres and artistic organizations.

== Festivals and open-air performances ==
=== The World Theatre Festival ===
The World Theatre Festival (Croatian: Festival svjetskog kazališta), sometimes translated as the World Theatre Zagreb Festival, is a festival held in Zagreb with a reputation for staging avant-garde and experimental theatre from around the world. It was co-founded by Dubravko Vrgoč and Ivica Buljan in 2003, and both serve as co-curators and artistic directors.

The festival also has an educational focus, aiming to give students exposure to new approaches to the study and creation of performing arts, by staging collaborations between experienced theatre directors and emerging playwrights. It features dramatic productions, opera and ballet,

It is usually held in September–October. The 2013 event was the 11th edition of the festival, run in July of that year. It is scheduled to be staged over December and January in 2021–2022, with extra measures in place to protect audiences, performers and staff due to the COVID-19 pandemic.

=== Other festivals ===
- The Dubrovnik Summer Festival is held annually since 1950 in July–August in Dubrovnik.
- The International Puppet Festival (PIF) is held in Zagreb in mid-September, with hundreds of puppet groups from all around the world having participated in the puppet shows, seminars and exhibitions. The inaugural PIF was held in 1968, and it has since built a sound international reputation. It is run by professional puppet companies.
- International Small Scene Theatre Festival, Rijeka
- Split Summer Festival* Zadar Snova Festival of Contemporary Theatre

== Awards ==
The Vladimir Nazor Award (Croatian: Nagrada Vladimir Nazor) arts and culture was established in 1959 and awarded every year by the Ministry of Culture. The prize is awarded to Croatian artists for achievements in six different fields of art and culture, and in each category every year two separate prizes are awarded – one for life achievement (for overall contributions to their respective field), and an annual award for outstanding work in the field created over the previous 12 months. The winners for the preceding year are usually announced around 19 June, the anniversary of Nazor's death, with the official award ceremony usually in July.

The Marin Držić Award (Croatian: Nagrada Marin Držić) has been granted by Ministry of Culture of Croatia since 1991. Its goal is to stimulate dramatic and theatrical work. Traditionally, the award ceremony is held in Split on the opening day of Marulić Days. The prize includes a fee and a bronze sculpture by Damir Matušić.

== See also ==
- Croatian literature
- Croatian Association of Theatre Critics and Theatre Scholars

== Sources ==
- Kazalište. Hrvatska enciklopedija, mrežno izdanje. Leksikografski zavod Miroslav Krleža, 2021. Pristupljeno 11. 3. 2021.
- Hrvatsko narodno kazalište: 1894–1969 Pavao Cindrić. (in Croatian) Croatian National Theatre: 1894–1969. Published by Enciklopedijsko izd., Zagreb. 1969
