= Nikola Andrić =

Croatian writer, philologist and translator

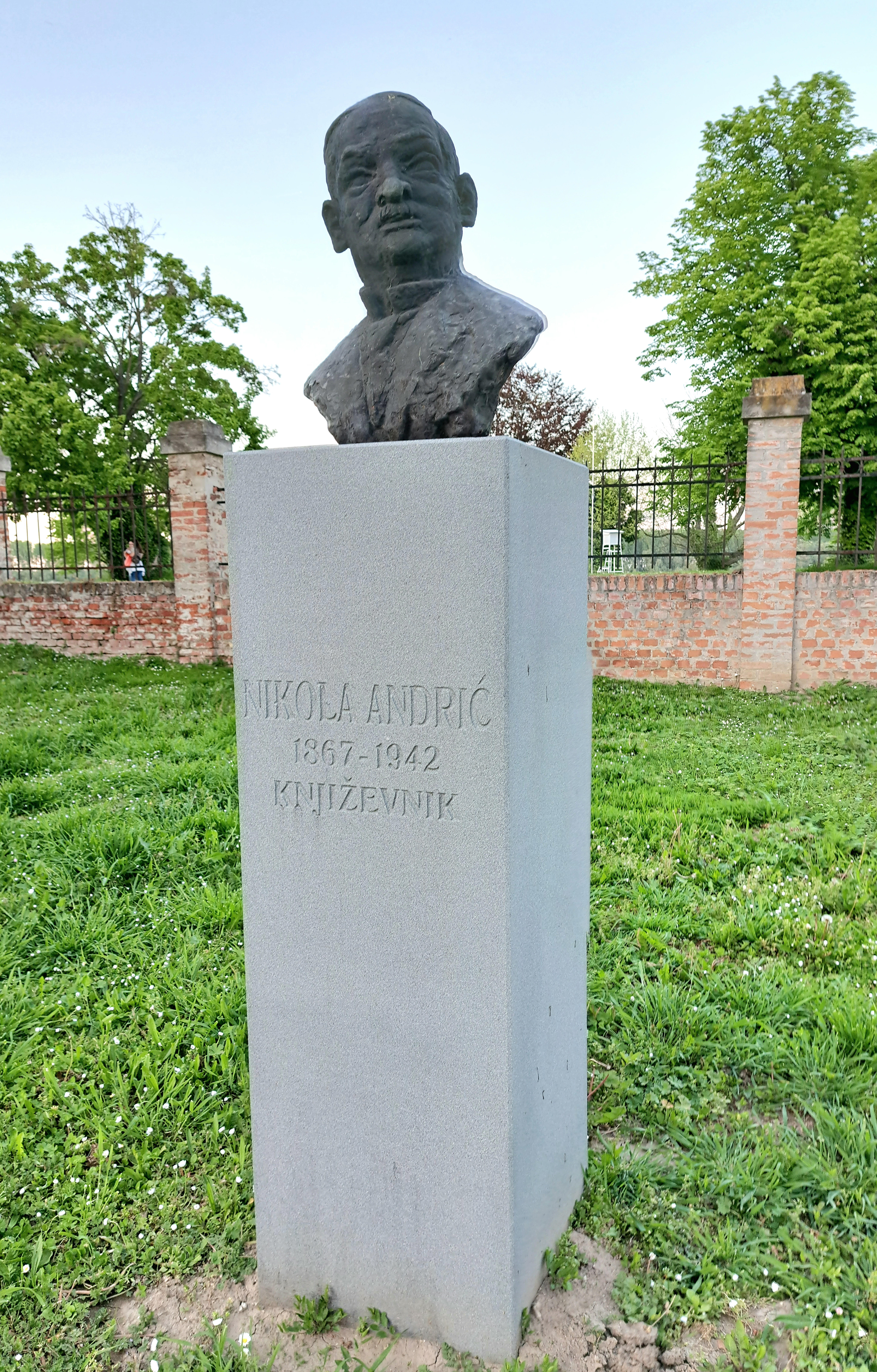
Bust of Nikola Andrić in Vukovar, Croatia.

Nikola Andrić (5 July 1867 – 7 April 1942) was a Croatian writer, philologist, and translator.

== Biography ==
Andrić was born in Vukovar in 1867. After obtaining a degree in Romance and Slavic studies in Vienna and Paris, he received his PhD in 1897 in Vienna. At the invitation of Stjepan Miletić, he became a dramaturge at the Croatian National Theatre in Zagreb (1894–1898, 1901–1907). In 1898, together with Miletić he founded the Acting School, where he taught for many years. He was one of the founders and the first manager of the National Theatre in Osijek in 1907.

In 1913, he started a popular publishing house Zabavna biblioteka ("Entertainment Library") and served as its editor-in-chief until his death. During that period, Zabavna biblioteka published more than 600 volumes of mostly translated novels, but also domestic fiction. It had a major role in shaping the taste of domestic readership.

Andrić served as a president of the Croatian Writers' Association. Between 1925 and 1926, he was an Assistant Minister of Education to Stjepan Radić in Belgrade.

He died in Zagreb.

== Writing ==
Andrić was a prolific writer who successfully contributed to various areas. In 1887 in the weekly Srijemski Hrvat he published a short story Lov na sjedećke, a parody of the humorous piece with the same name written by Vilim Korajac. Since 1888 he regularly writes essays on French literature for Vijenac.

His first book U vagonu (1891) is a compilation of feuilletons written in his youth. A bit more successful were his travelogues Od Balkana do Montblanca ("From the Balkans to the Montblanc"; I–II, 1927). Andrić's literary-historical and linguistic works are generally considered much more valuable than his fictional works. His book Pod apsolutizmom ("Under absolutism"; 1906) is a synthesis of Croatian literary production during the period of Bach's absolutism (1851–1860), and the study Izvori starih kajkavskih drama ("The sources of old Kajkavian dramas"; Rad JAZU, 146, 1901) he investigates the lesser-known, mostly German templates for the 18th century Kajkavian dramas.

In 1902 he published a book about the making of secular literature in Slavonia, Iz ratničke književnosti hrvatske. He wrote a monograph on Serbian writer Pavle Solarić, and in 1895 a book Spomen-knjiga Hrvatskog zemaljskog kazališta pri otvaranju nove kazališne zgrade ("The memorial book of the Croatian State Theatre for the opening of the new theater building").

His most famous work is Branič jezika hrvatskoga ("Defender of Croatian"; 1911), a language advisory book characterized by the departure from lexical normativisms advocated by Croatian Vukovians.

Andrić also gave a valuable contribution to lexicography in Šta je šta ("What's what", 1938, together with Iso Velikanović) – the first picture dictionary of Croatian. At the invitation of the President of Matica hrvatska Tadija Smičiklas in 1894, he edited and published six books of Croatian folk songs, followed by a treatise on the motifs, language and ethos in Croatian folk poetry. Of 603 works published by Zabavna biblioteka he personally translated more than 60 novels and short stories, as well as the same number of dramas – mostly from French, German and Russian.

Critics have called Andrić a polyglot and erudite whose literary-historical and essayistic work surpassed his fictional works.

== Works ==
- Prijevodna beletristika u Srba od godine 1777–1847, Zagreb, 1892
- U vagonu (under a pseudonym Miloje Fruškogorac), Zemun, 1894
- Spomen-knjiga Hrvatskoga zemaljskog kazališta Zagreb, 1895
- Odgovor na odgovor Živanovića. Prilog konačnome sporazumu., Zagreb, 1899
- Izvori starih kajkavskih drama, Rad JAZU, 1901, 146, pp. 1–77
- Značenje Marka Marulića, Zagreb, 1901
- Iz ratničke književnosti hrvatske, Zagreb, 1902
- Život i književni rad Pavla Solarića, Rad JAZU, 1902, 150, pp. 103–194.
- Pod apsolutizmom, Zagreb, 1906
- Branič jezika hrvatskoga, Zagreb, 1911
- Od Balkana do Montblanca, 1–2, Zagreb, 1927
- Šta je šta. Stvarni hrvatski rječnik u slikama (co-authored with Iso Velikanović), Zagreb, 1938
