= Krilić =

Krilić is a surname. Notable people with the surname include:

- Zlatko Krilić (born 1955), Croatian children's writer
- Max Krilich (born 1950), Australian rugby league footballer
