= Croatian Writers' Association =

DHK
- Croatian Writers' Association
- Društvo hrvatskih književnika
- Formation: 1900; 126 years ago
- Purpose: Croatian literature
- Location: Zagreb, Croatia
- President: Hrvojka Mihanovic Salopek
- Vice-president: Željka Lovrenčić
- Vice-president: Mirko Ćurić
- Website: http://dhk.hr/

Croatian Writers' Association (Croatian: Društvo hrvatskih književnika; abbreviated DHK) is the official association of Croatian writers. It was founded in 1900 in Zagreb with the goal "to unite writers and help them support one another, and promote Croatian literature regardless of political objectives", "to protect the interests and increase the reputation of writers" and "supports its members and their orphans." The DHK's president is Hrvojka Mihanović Salopek, while Željka Lovrenčić and Mirko Ćurić are vice-presidents.

== History ==
In 1897 the Croatian Writers' Club (Klub hrvatskih književnika) unofficially operated as part of the Association of Croatian Artists (Društvo hrvatskih umjetnika ), and was led by Milivoj Dežman. In 1898 the first informal agreement on the establishment of the Croatian Writers' Association was held, and a regulatory proposal was written. Matica hrvatska in 1899 approved the establishment of a separate Association, and on March 17, 1900 the government approved its rules. Rules established four categories of members: real members (pravi članovi), association founders (zakladnici), founders (utemeljitelji) and associate members (izvanredni članovi). The association was established by the so called Mladi (Young) writers contrary to Stari (Old) writers gathered in Matica hrvatska and it's journal Vienac.

At the inaugural meeting on April 2, 1900, held in the presence of 103 writers, Ivan Trnski was elected for the first president of the Association. In 1906 a monthly Contemporary (Savremenik) was launched. At the end of the 1908 the series Modern Croatian Writers (Suvremeni hrvatski pisci) was established, which was particularly prominent under the editorship of Julije Benešić (1909–1920). It was in that series that the famous anthology Croatian Young Lyric (Hrvatska mlada lirika ) was published in 1914.

The association's first years were marked by convergent efforts towards Matica Hrvatska – the association's publications of the Modern Croatian Writers series and the magazine Contemporary were supported by Matica hrvatska as possibly jointly published. At the same time the association advocated literary unity of Croats and Serbs, and proposals were made to issue a common literary magazine. In 1914 the association was temporarily suspended by a government decision due to the World War I. The postwar efforts of the association were marked by a support to linguistic and orthographic unification of Croats and Serbs.

Due to failed agreements with Matica hrvatska, financial deficit and a fierce competition of the newly established magazines, the Contemporary ceased to be published in 1922, and after being temporarily issued in 1923 it was resuspended in 1924–1926. The topic of the establishment of the Yugoslav Writers' Association was actively discussed, and after a proposal of the Association of Writers in Belgrade "for all writers of our country be united in one association", the Committee of the Croatian Writers' Association replied in 1927 that it such initiatives are still premature, and has proposed an alliance of autonomous associations instead.

The death of Stjepan Radić all the more strengthened the Croatian national spirit of the association. The Association operated during the period of Independent State of Croatia as well. In 1945 the Association was renamed the Association of Writers of Croatia (Društvo književnika Hrvatske), new rules were approved and a new board was elected with Luka Perković as the president. A few dozen writers were punished by prohibiting their public work and a temporary suspension of having their works published.

In 1949 the Second Congress of the Writers' Union of Yugoslavia was held in Zagreb, in which the new administration was elected with Ivo Andrić as the President, and the board consisting of Miroslav Krleža, Marin Franičević, Josip Barković, Petar Šegedin, Viktor Car Emin and Slavko Kolar. In 1964 the association's plenum unanimously adopted the Declaration on the Status and Name of the Croatian Literary Language, and during the Croatian Spring the association stood with Matica hrvatska in support the movement. In the 1980s, especially after the last congress of the Writers' Union of Yugoslavia in Novi Sad in 1985, the association was more actively involved in political life, usually by writing open letters in defense of Croatian language, or civil rights of individual writers. In 1990 the original name of the Association was restored.

In 2002 several former members, dissatisfied with the state of the association, founded the Croatian Association of Writers (Hrvatsko društvo pisaca). The first president of the new association, Velimir Visković, explains the necessity of secession by the dominance of the radical right-wing nationalist ideology in the DHK.

== Association today ==
The association has regional chapters in Pula, Rijeka, Zadar, Split, Osijek and Čakovec. It issues several magazines: Bridge (Most), Republic (Republika) and Korabljica. The series Contemporary Croatian Writers has been renewed under the name Library of the Croatian Writers' Association (Knjižnica Društva hrvatskih književnika). Several literary awards have been established.

== Presidents ==
- Stjepan Miletić
- Natko Nodilo
- Ksaver Šandor Gjalski (twice)
- Nikola Andrić (twice)
- Branimir Livadić
- Mihovil Nikolić
- Milutin Cihlar Nehajev
- Milivoj Dežman
- Stjepan Trontl
- Franjo Fancev
- Ilija Jakovljević
- Mile Budak
- Luka Perković (1945–1948)
- Slavko Kolar (1948–1952)
- Ivan Dončević (1952)
- Petar Šegedin (1953, 1968–1970)
- Mirko Božić (1954, 1959–1960)
- Miroslav Feldman (1955)
- Vjekoslav Kaleb (1956)
- Marijan Matković (1957–1958)
- Jure Kaštelan (1961)
- Dobriša Cesarić (1962)
- Dragutin Tadijanović (1963)
- Gustav Krklec (1964, 1974–1976)
- Vlatko Pavletić (1965–1968)
- Ivo Frangeš (1970–1972)
- Jure Franičević-Pločar (1972–1974)
- Josip Barković (1976–1977)
- Milivoj Slaviček (1978–1979)
- Šime Vučetić (1980–1981)
- Pero Budak (1982–1984)
- Marija Peakić Mikuljan (1985–1989)
- Nedjeljko Fabrio (1989–1995)
- Ante Stamać (1995–1999)
- Slavko Mihalić (1999–2005)
- Stjepan Čuić (2005–2008)
- Borben Vladović (2008–2011)
- Božidar Petrač (2011–2017)
- Zlatko Krilić (2020–2023)
- Hrvojka Mihanović Salopek (2023-)

== See also ==
- Association of Writers of Yugoslavia
