= Zagreb Puppet Theatre =

Zagreb Puppet Theatre Zagrebačko kazalište lutaka
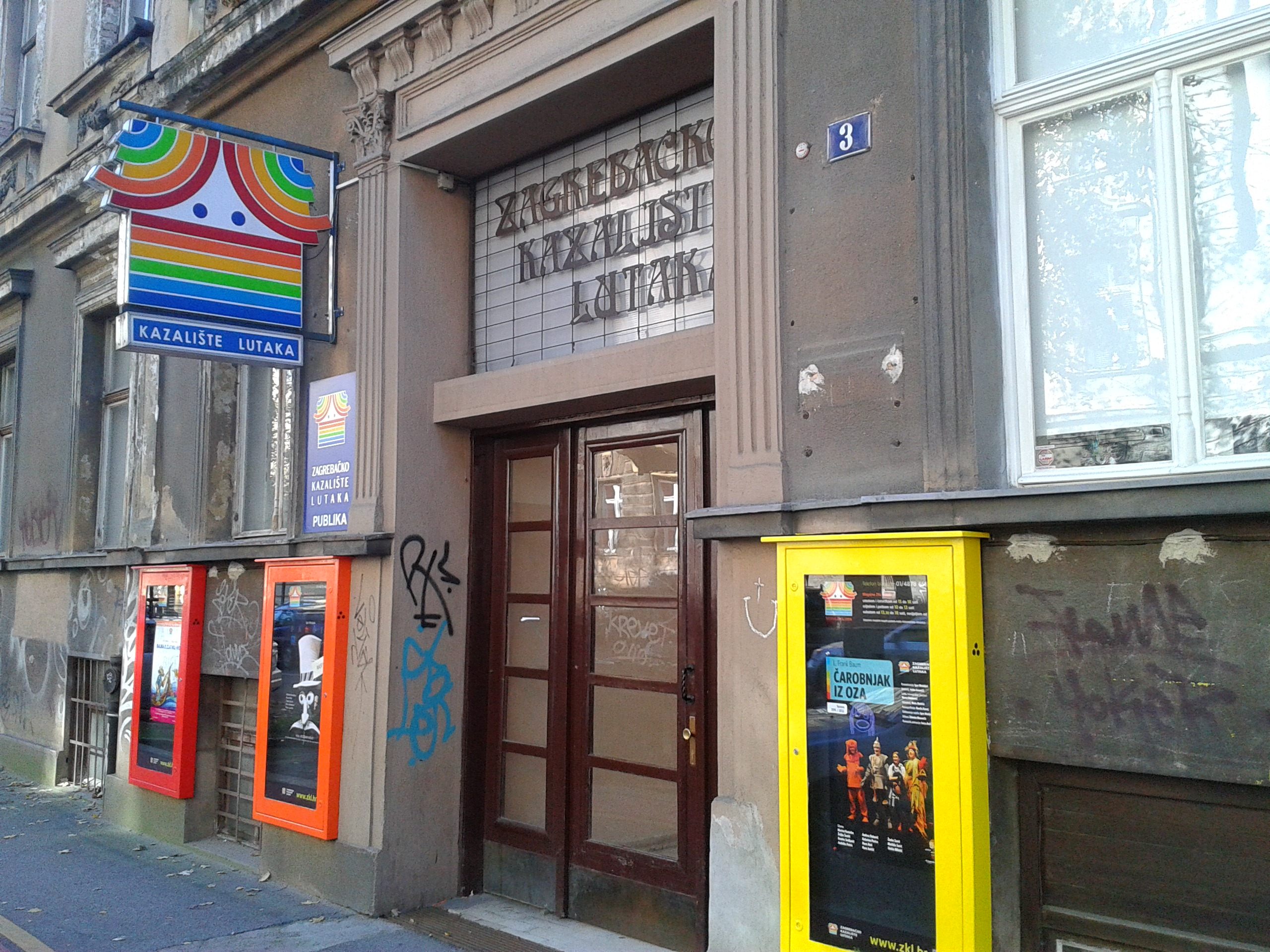
- Entrance to the theatre
- Interactive map of Zagreb Puppet Theatre; Zagrebačko kazalište lutaka
- Address: Barun Trenk 2 Zagreb; Croatia
- Coordinates: 45.8076785°N 15.9752126°E
- Capacity: 212

Construction
- Years active: 1948 – present

Website
- (Official Website)

Zagreb Puppet Theatre (Croatian: Zagrebačko kazalište lutaka) was founded in 1948 by the City of Zagreb, and is the oldest professional Croatian puppet theatre. The theatre is geared primarily towards children, which has also performed abroad and has participated in charitable work. Notable members of this theatre include Velimir Chytil and Krešimir Dolenčić.

== History and specifications ==
The forerunner to this theatre was Kazalište Lutaka, founded in 1947 and whose contributors included the actress Tilla Durieux. The current theater was created in 1948 following a name change and is located in a Lower Town building on Barun Trenk 2 street, which is in the vicinity of the main train station. The theatre is equipped both with a main hall consisting of 212 seats, the minor hall and a garden used for larger gatherings during summer. The theatre constructs it own puppets and scenes in its workshop and has produced more than 300 plays since its inception with around 70 employees. Shows typically start at noon or 6pm. As of 2020, it is led by Ljiljana Štokalo, being its director.

The theatre describes its goal as "finding a balance between spoken words and stage spectacle", claiming that technical aspects should not overshadow the conveyed message. Some plays are based on the works of contemporary authors, but most use classic fairy tales (such as Ribar Palunko i njegova žena, by Ivana Brlić-Mažuranić) as basis, but are reworked by both local and foreign directors who work in puppet theatre.

During 1998, the theatre was expanded and revitalized due to increasing demands from the performers.

== Current repertoire ==
As of 2020:

- Alladin and the Magic Lamp
- Bambi
- White stag (Bijeli jelen), directed by Zoran Mužić
- A Christmas Carol
- Bubamarac
- Cvilidreta
- Puss in Boots
- Little Red Riding Hood
- Snow White, directed by Zoran Mužić
- Magic Flute. directed by Krešimir Dolenčić
