= Hvar Arsenal =

Historic building in Hvar, Croatia

Coordinates: 43.1721°N 16.4417°E

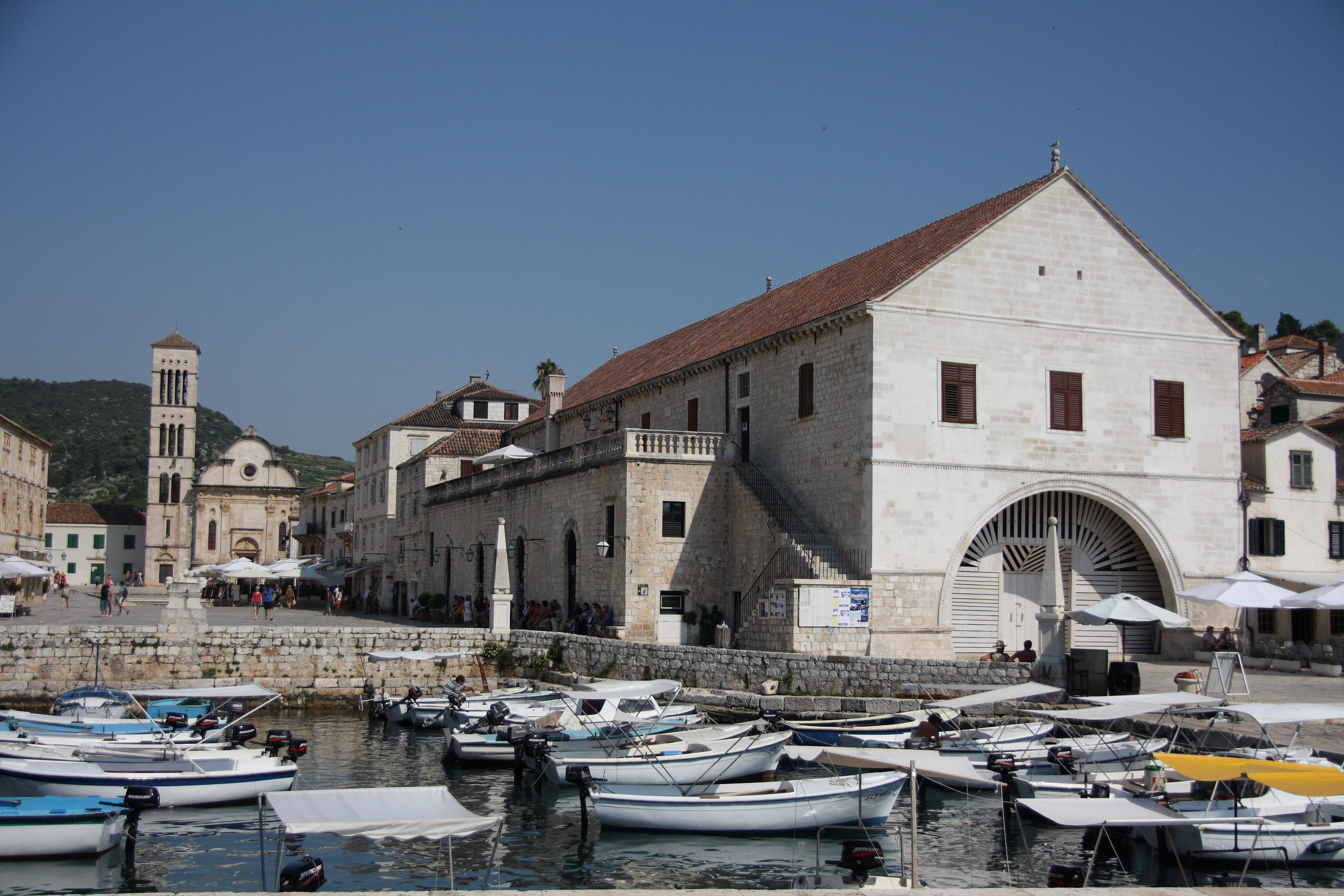
Arsenal Hvar

The Hvar Arsenal is a historic building in the town of Hvar, Croatia. It was first constructed in the 14th century as a maintenance shipyard for the galley of the commune. Over time it was further expanded and gained additional functions. Most notable is the historic theater (Hvarsko Kazalište), built in 1612 as part of the first floor, above the galley space. It is a multi-functional building centered on the theater.

== History ==
The Arsenal in Hvar has developed and changed in accordance with the historical, social and technological changes of its day. It was first built in the period between 1292 (the decision to build) and 1331 (its existence confirmed). The location was chosen with regard to the dangers of weather and high seas to the port of Hvar and so to enable the integration of the building into the protection of the city walls. The later built city walls have never included Arsenal and multiple other important buildings.

=== The first construction phase (1292/1317 - 1331) ===
The existing ground floor walls in the area of the 2. - 8. bays are built in the first construction phase, in the beginning of the 14th century. The foundations of these walls lay directly on the historical layers from antiquity. These old structures have been formed to accommodate foundations for the arsenal, as well as the slipway inside the building. The slipway was covered with a clay finish and was used as a work surface for the maintenance of the galley.

The first, 14th century arsenal was essentially a building protected from the weather by two walls and a roof. It was a precondition for the municipality to fulfill its commitment to the Republic of Venice: to maintain, equip and finance a municipal galley and to train and provide a crew from its own residents. The size and shape of the building was in accordance with the size of the 14th century galley. The first design of the arsenal was, according to the preserved parts and the practice of similar buildings, simple, industrial and without architectural decoration.

After the Republic of Venice came to power the municipality of Hvar was under pressure to rapidly build the arsenal (and other infrastructure) to fulfill the municipal galley duty. The building was financed and controlled by the municipality. It was the work of local masters who made it as simple and cost-effective as possible. The 2nd – 8th bay arsenal is 40 meters long, what corresponds to the galley of the time. The side walls were about one meter higher than today's level of the first floor.

=== The second construction phase (1528 - 1559) ===
The arsenal has been preserved and used by the municipality despite the multiple changes of rule on the island until the 16th century (Venice had lost control of the island of Hvar in the period 1358 - 1420). An expansion was carried out in the period of 1528 - 1559, because social and political circumstances made greater demands on the building.

In this second construction phase arsenal was extended by today's first bay and built up to its today’s height. An inner terrace was created in the first bay to provide dry storage space for provisions. The building was closed with the newly built western and eastern facade.

=== The third construction phase (1575 - 1612) ===
The arsenal was burnt down in the Ottoman attack of 1571. A gunpowder explosion on October 1, 1579 at the fort over Hvar has certainly additionally damaged the building. A third construction phase was necessary to put the building back into operation. It is evident from the new construction that the Arsenal in Hvar has become more important as a supply center for the navy and the merchant fleet than just a space in which one galley was kept and maintained.

A new inner floor was built in the interior of the existing arsenal, along its entire length. It was divided into two parts, the eastern and the western. To support the floor, seven circular arch supports were erected in the ground floor hall. - The interior was divided for the first time in eight bays that are visible today. The circular arches are undamaged by the fire and were certainly constructed after the fire of 1571.

A lot of masonry work on the surfaces was needed to fix fire damage. On the outer side, the two most visible facades, the western and the northern, were rebuilt. In the interior, the foundations on the ground floor were repaired (the face was rebuilt with new stones, as well as some damaged but reused parts). Inside the first floor, all the walls were repaired with a mix of new and old, fire damaged stones.

Warehouses on the northern arsenal facade were bought by the municipality and converted into a communal warehouse - Fontik.

The third construction phase is characterized by more attention to detail and ornament. The building is in the city center, on the main square and very visible for any visitor upon arrival. The repair of the northern and western facades was an opportunity to create a more impressive architecture, especially when compared to the earlier construction period (visible today on the southern and eastern facades). There are more ornaments, more respect for proportion and symmetry. The walls from the outside are better built – more precise, with better shaped stones.

Probably the most important legacy of the building, the historic theater, was constructed in the third phase on the eastern side of the first floor. The entrance to the theater was the Belvedere, the monumental terrace on the Fontik side. This terrace was made accessible by the newly built staircase on the western facade. Everything that was built on the northern facade in the third construction phase is designed to accentuate the monumental door, the entrance to the theater. The door itself is richly designed and dominates the northern facade. Above the entrance to the theater is the inscription: ANNO PACIS SECUNDO MDCXII ("The Second Year of Peace 1612").

The galley named "Sveti Jerolim" that was maintained and equipped by the Hvar comune has taken part in the battle of Lepanto in 1571. The bow ornament of the galley has been preserved in Hvar.

=== The 18th century roof reconstruction (1727) and the end of the galley service obligation (1716) ===
In historical sources is mentioned that the roof was deconstructed and rebuilt in 1727. According to a report, engineer Francesco Melchiori is said to have overseen the renovation.

Since 1716, the Hvar community had no longer a duty to equip and maintain a galley. After the new agreement with the Venetian Republic, Hvar financially supported the army instead of directly participating in conflicts with their own galley. The reason for this decision is that the 18th century brought the end of the galley as a significant type of ship and as part of the navy. The arsenal continued to be used as a warehouse for the fleet and the residents. It had been a part of the Venetian arsenal network since the beginning of the 13th century.

=== The Austrian monarchy (19th century) ===
All of Dalmatia together with Hvar was placed under Austrian rule in the Vienna Congress of 1814. After the Venetian period, when Hvar became strategically important and had a high level of self-government, at the beginning of the 19th century the municipality became only an administrative unit under Austrian law and Austrian administrative officials.

The Arsenal was occupied by the Austrian army and adapted to their needs. Since the army had used the theater for a short while as a warehouse, the interior was damaged. In the period of 1801 - 1803, the Societa del Teatro rebuilt the interior. A wooden structure auditorium with 33 lodges on two floors was created by Petar Crescini. A thorough repair / reconstruction was carried out in the period of 1888 - 1900. The wooden structure of the auditorium was completely rebuilt in a Neo-baroque style, which has been preserved.

=== 20th century ===
The ground floor of the arsenal was widely used in the 20th century, mostly as a warehouse. In the second half of the 20th century a cinema was installed. The room was and is still used today for various performances and exhibitions.

The theater on the first floor of the eastern part was in operation during most of the 20th century. It was closed for safety reasons in 1996. A renovation, with special regard to fire safety has been undertaken.

== See also ==
- Venetian Arsenal
- Stato da Màr
- Hvar Island
