= Zlatko Krilić =

Croatian writer

- Born: 19 August 1955; Osijek, Yugoslavia
- Education: University of Zagreb
- Occupation: Writer

Zlatko Krilić (born 19 August 1955) is a Croatian children's books writer.

Krilić was born in Osijek and spent his childhood in Čepin. He graduated from the Faculty of Teacher Education of the University of Zagreb. Beside writing books for children, Krilić also wrote plays and directed several puppet shows based on his novels. On 26 September 2020 he became the president of the Croatian Writers' Association. He won the Grigor Vitez Award for best children's book for his Početak plovidbe ("The Beginning of Navigation").
