= Stjepan Miletić =

Croatian dramatist (1868–1908)

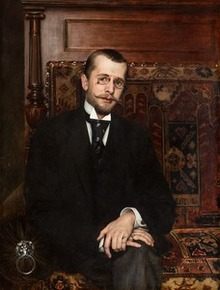
- A portrait of Miletić by Vlaho Bukovac, 1894
- Born: 24 March 1868; Zagreb, Kingdom of Croatia-Slavonia, Austria-Hungary (now Zagreb, Croatia)
- Died: 8 September 1908 (aged 40); Munich, German Empire (now Munich, Germany)
- Occupation: director

Stjepan Miletić (Croatian pronunciation: [stjêpaːn mǐletit͡ɕ]; 24 March 1868 – 8 September 1908) was a Croatian playwright, director, critic, and writer.

== Biography ==
Stjepan Miletić Jr. was born in Zagreb in 1868 to the noble Miletić family. He studied philosophy in Vienna, later achieving a doctorate in the subject there as well in 1893. He took over the management of the Croatian National Theater (Croatian: Hrvatsko narodno kazalište; HNK) on 11 February 1894, instituting several reforms, including introducing electric lighting to the theater and founding the first acting school in Croatia. He remained director there until 1898. Among his achievements as director, he greatly expanded the repertoire of the theater, both with domestic and foreign works. On the domestic front, he introduced the works of theretofore unknown writers, such as Ivo Vojnović, Ante Tresić Pavičić, and Milutin Cihlar Nehajev, as well as revivals of Croatian classics such as Ivan Gundulić's Dubravka and Junije Palmotić's Pavlimir. From foreign works, he was able to bring many works from William Shakespeare's oeuvre to Croatian theater, including A Midsummer's Night Dream, Hamlet, and Romeo and Juliet. Other foreign writers Miletić brought to the stage include Molière, Euripides, Johann Wolfgang von Goethe, Kālidāsa, Henrik Ibsen, and Pedro Calderón de la Barca. Miletić was noteworthy as the first director of the HNK who was not an actor by trade and did not sign his directions, as was common at the time. However, it was an open secret that he directed some entire shows, as well as some sections of the foreign repertoire. Shakespeare's body of work inspired Miletić to write his own pentalogy on Croatian kings – though he only finished Tomislav (1902) and Pribina (1903) – and Boleslav (1894), inspired particularly by Hamlet.

Given his upbringing in a noble family, he was able to spend lavishly on the theater and was not dependent on state subsidies. In 1902, his son, Oktavijan Miletić, who became a well-regarded cinematographer and director, was born. In 1904, he wrote a memoir that also served as a book on modernizing and improving the repertoire of the theater, Croatian Theater (Croatian: Hrvatsko glumište).

In 1908, he died in Munich. He is buried at Mirogoj Cemetery.
