= I Gymnasium Split =

I Gymnasium, Classical Gymnasium
- I. gimnazija, Klasična gimnazija
- Gymnasium Classicum Spalatense

Location
- Split; Croatia
- 43°30′53″N 16°26′01″E

Information
- Type: Public
- Established: 10 November 1817
- Song: Gaudeamus
- Nickname: "Klasična"

The Classical Gymnasium (Croatian: Klasična gimnazija) was a gymnasium high school in Split, Dalmatia, Croatia whose tradition is continued by today's First Gymnasium (I. gimnazija, Prva gimnazija) in Split.

== History ==
The Classical Gymnasium was founded by the Austrian Empire and its Imperial Royal General Government in Dalmatia in 1817. Dalmatian Government, in fact, seceded the public part of the Archidiocesan Classical Gymnasium, founded by archbishop Stefano Cosmi in 1700.

The program lasted six years till 1848. As the lyceum was added, the program lasted eight years till 1967. From 1963 on the first four years were relocated in the eight year elementary school, so the program of the remaining classes lasted four years.

The program after World War II was based on combining classical education, with emphasis on humanities (namely languages including Latin and Ancient Greek, and mainly English among foreign languages, philosophy, literature, history, fine art, music and theatre, mathematics, natural sciences and extracurricular activities.

The school reform in 1977 abolished gymnasiums from the school system and the Classical gymnasium formally ceased to exist. Its program was reimplemented since 1991 in the classical section of I Gymnasium in Split.

The 200th anniversary of the Classical Gymnasium in Split was celebrated 25 May 2017 with a symposium in Split.

== Alumni ==
After the school year 2023/24, 131 graduates of this gymnasium enrolled at an institution of higher learning in Croatia, or 96.32% of students who took up the nationwide Matura exams. The most common destinations for these students were the University of Split faculties of humanities and social sciences, economics, electrical engineering, mechanical engineering and shipbuilding, law, and science.

=== Notable teachers ===
Among the professors were prominent Croatian cultural actors, among the others Natko Nodilo, Šime Ljubić, don Frane Bulić, Eugen Kumičić, Milan Rešetar, Vladimir Nazor, Milan Begović during the 19th century, and then Josip Barač, Mirko Deanović, Antun Dobronić, Josip Hatze, Vjekoslav Rosenberg-Ružić, Ivo Krešić-Jurić, Petar Kurir, Žarko Muljačić.

=== Notable students ===
Among the graduates there were Francesco Carrara, Niccolò Tommaseo, Antonio Bajamonti, Frane Lappenna, Dujam Rendić-Miočević, Vid Morpurgo, Giovanni Maver, Jakov Gotovac, Mate Ujević, Kruno Prijatelj, Bogdan Žižić, Igor Zidić, Igor Mandić, Vinko Cuzzi, Tonko Maroević, Inoslav Bešker.

== Sources ==
- Spomenica 150-godišnjice Klasične gimnazije u Splitu : 1817-1967, Split, 1967(in Croatian)
- Split: posljednji klasičari na okupu nakon trideset godina, Slobodna Dalmacija 29.06.2008(in Croatian)
- I. gimnazija Split – Povijest škole(in Croatian)
