= List of people from Osijek =

This is a list of famous people who were born or have lived in Osijek, Croatia.

== Artists, musicians and actors ==
- Meri Andraković (born 2000), (singer)
- Viktor Axmann (1878–1946), (architect)
- Zlatko Burić (born 1953), (Croatian-Danish actor)
- Petra Cicvarić (born 1986), (actress)
- Bela Čikoš Sesija (1864–1931), (painter, one among the first representatives of symbolism (secesija, art nouveau) in Croatia)
- Mia Dimšić (born 1992), (singer, who will represent Croatia in the Eurovision Song Contest 2022)
- Andrej Dojkic (born 1980), (actor)
- Goran Grgić (born 1965), (actor)
- Zvonimir Jurić (born 1971), (film and TV director)
- Julije Knifer (1924–2004), (painter)
- Franjo Krežma (1862–1881), (violinist)
- Branko Lustig (1932–2019), (Hollywood producer and winner of two Oscars)
- Branko Mihaljević (1931–2005), (composer), spent his career in Osijek and died in Osijek
- Krešimir Mikić (born 1974), (actor)
- Oliver Mlakar (born 1935), (TV anchor)
- Oscar Nemon (1906–1985), (sculptor)
- Aklea Neon (born 1990), (singer)
- Zlatko Pejaković (born 1950), (singer)
- Slava Raškaj (1877–1906), (painter)
- Ivan Rein (1905–1943), (painter)
- Rod Riffler (1907–1941), (modern dance teacher and choreographer)
- Sigmund Romberg (1887–1951), (composer), studied in Osijek (Osijek gymnasium)
- Zdenka Rubinstein (1911–1961), (operatic soprano)
- Branko Schmidt (born 1957), (film director)
- Krunoslav Slabinac (1944–2020), (popular singer)
- Miroslav Škoro (born 1962), (singer and composer)
- Dado Topić (born 1949), (singer)
- Adolf Waldinger (1843–1904), (19th-century painter)

== Authors ==
- Luka Bekavac (born 1976), (writer, university professor and translator)
- Danilo Blanuša (1903–1987), (mathematician, physicist, engineer and a professor)
- Maja Bošković-Stulli (1922–2012), (historian, writer, publisher and academic)
- Borivoj Dovniković (1930–2022), (film director, animator, caricaturist, illustrator and graphic designer)
- Drago Hedl (born 1950), (journalist, editor of Feral Tribune, winner of the Knight International Journalism Award in 2006)
- Vladimir Herzog (1937–1975), (Brazilian TV journalist, university professor and theater author)
- Vane Ivanović (1913–1999), (athlete, political activist and writer)
- Matija Petar Katančić (1750–1825), (18th-century writer, university professor for archaeology, translator of the Bible in the Croatian, author of the first paper over the archaeology in Croatia)
- Zlatko Krilić (born 1955), (writer and the president of the Croatian Writers' Association)
- Franjo Maixner (1841–1903), (university professor and rector of the University of Zagreb)
- Krista Kostial-Šimonović (1923–2018), (physician and academic)
- Viktor Sonnenfeld (1902–1969), (translator and philosopher)

== Politicians ==
- Biljana Borzan (born 1971), (member of the European Parliament and member of the Social Democratic Party of Croatia)
- Josip Frank (1844–1911), (lawyer and politician)
- Vilim Herman (born 1949), (former representative in the Croatian Parliament for Croatian Social Liberal Party)
- Branimir Glavaš (born 1956), (right-wing politician)
- Ivan Rikard Ivanović (1880–1949), (politician and industrialist)
- Zlatko Kramarić (born 1956), (liberal politician and former mayor)
- Vladimir Šeks (born 1943), (President (Speaker) of the Croatian Parliament)
- Vesna Škare Ožbolt (born 1961), (leader of the Democratic Centre political party)
- Daniel Srb (born 1964), (politician)

== Scientists ==
- Mislav Grgić (born 1973), (university professor, scientist, Ph.D., technical sciences and electrical engineer)
- Branko Grünbaum (1929–2018), (mathematician and professor)
- Snježana Kordić (born 1964), (Croatian linguist)
- Andrija Mohorovičić (1857–1936), (meteorologist and seismologist born in Volosko, Istria)
- Vladimir Prelog (1906–1998), (chemist, Nobel prize winner, born in Sarajevo, Bosnia and Herzegovina)
- Lavoslav (Leopold) Ružička (1887–1976), (chemist, Nobel prize winner; born in nearby Vukovar and attended famous Osijek high school/gymnasium)

== Athletes ==
- Zdenko Adamović (born 1963), (football player)
- Ivan Aleksić (born 1993), (football player)
- Maja Anić (born 1988), (rower)
- Silvio Anočić (born 1997), (football player)
- Zoran Arsenić (born 1994), (football player)
- Marko Babić (born 1981), (football player)
- Valentin Babić (born 1981), (football player)
- Davor Bagarić (born 1985), (football player)
- Davor Bajsić (born 1974), (football player)
- Davorka Balić (born 1988), (basketball player)
- Borna Barišić (born 1992), (football player)
- Josip Barišić (born 1986), (football player)
- Luka Barišić (born 1998), (basketball player)
- Aurel Benović (born 2000), (artistic gymnast)
- Nenad Bjelica (born 1971), (football player)
- Saša Branežac (born 1976), (football player)
- Bernarda Brčić (born 1991), (volleyball player)
- Zorko Cvetković (1924–2017), (electrical engineer and basketball player)
- Igor Cvitanović (born 1970), (football player)
- Slobodanka Čolović (born 1965), (athlete, who competed at the 1988 Summer Olympics, finishing fourth, and a gold at the 1987 Mediterranean Games)
- Matej Dodig (born 2005), (tennis player)
- Jelena Dokić (born 1983), (Australian tennis player, former #4 on WTA)
- Marko Dugandžić (born 1994), (football player)
- Beta Dumančić (born 1991), (volleyball player)
- Siniša Ergotić (born 1968), (long jumper)
- Dražen Funtak (born 1975), (sprint canoer)
- Mika Grbavica (born 2001), (volleyball player)
- Ivan Horvat (born 1993), (pole vaulter)
- Emanuel Horvatiček (born 1979), (sprint canoer)
- Krunoslav Hulak (1951–2015), (chess player)
- Katica Ileš (born 1946), (handball player)
- Silvio Ivandija (born 1964), (handball player and current handball coach)
- Vedrana Jakšetić (born 1996), (volleyball player)
- Sonja Kešerac (born 1985), (rower)
- Kristijan Krajina (born 1990), (basketball player)
- Petar Krpan (born 1974), (football player)
- Vladimir Krstić (born 1972), (basketball coach and former player)
- Zvonimir Krznarić (born 1972), (sprint canoer)
- Josip Kuna (born 1972), (sport shooter)
- Nikica Ljubek (born 1980), (sprint canoer)
- Ivan Meštrović (born 1979), (entrepreneur and sportsman)
- Svetlana Ognjenović (born 1981), (handball player)
- Sena Pavetić (born 1986), (basketball player)
- Kosta Perović (born 1985), (Serbian basketball player; first basketball player born in Osijek to be drafted into NBA)
- Alen Petrović (born 1969), (football player)
- Dino Radoš (born 1991), (basketball player)
- Davor Rupnik (born 1971), (football manager and former player)
- David Šain (born 1988), (rower)
- Ninoslav Saraga (born 1969), (rower)
- Jasna Šekarić (born 1965), (Serbian sport shooter; winner of one gold, three silver and one bronze medal at Olympic games; winner of International Shooting Sport Federation "Shooter of the Millennium" award)
- Dražen Sermek (born 1969), (chess player)
- Dino Skender (born 1983), (football manager)
- Ivo Smoje (born 1978), (football player)
- Robert Špehar (born 1970), (football player)
- Davor Šuker (born 1968), (football player, winner of Golden Boot at 1998 FIFA World Cup)
- Karlo Uljarević (born 1998), (basketball player)
- Saša Vasiljević (born 1979), (Bosnian basketball player)
- Donna Vekić (born 1996), (tennis player)
- Mario Vekić (born 1982), (rower)
- Aljoša Vojnović (born 1985), (football player)
- Ljubomir Vorkapić (born 1967), (Serbian football player)
- Jurica Vranješ (born 1980), (football player)
- Vojislav Vujević (born 1955), (judoka)
- Darko Zibar (born 1958), (rower)
- Nataša Zorić (born 1989), (tennis player)

== Other ==
- Tatjana Aparac-Jelušić (born 1948), (librarian)
- Jelica Belović-Bernadzikowska (1870–1946), (ethnographer, journalist, writer, and feminist)
- Jovan Četirević Grabovan (1720–1781), (icon painter)
- Igor Ćutuk (born 1976), (journalist)
- Zora Dirnbach (1929–2019), (journalist and writer)
- Nikola Đuretić (born 1949), (writer and publisher)
- Francis, Duke of Teck (1837–1900), (German Prince, great grandfather of Queen Elizabeth II)
- Drago Hedl (born 1950), (investigative journalist)
- Mirko Hermann (1868–1927), (industrialist, businessman, banker and member of the Freemasonry in Osijek)
- Slavko Hirsch (1893–1942), (physician, founder and director of the Epidemiological Institute in Osijek)
- Mihajlo Klajn (1912–1941), (agronomist and communist killed during the Holocaust)
- Arnold Kohn (1905–1984), (Zionist and longtime president of the Jewish community Osijek)
- Franjo Šeper (1905–1981), (Archbishop of Zagreb from 1960 to 1968, and Prefect of the Congregation for the Doctrine of the Faith from 1968 to 1981)
- Ferdo Šišić (1869–1940), (historian)
- Josip Juraj Strossmayer (1815–1905), (Maecenas bishop)
- Simon Ungar (1864–1942), (rabbi of the Osijek Jewish community)
- Miroslav Volf (born 1956), (Christian theologian)
- Branko Vukelić (1904–1945), (spy working for Richard Sorge's spy ring in Japan)
