= Adventurer at the Door =

1926 play by Milan Begović

Adventurer at the Door (Croatian: Pustolov pred vratima) is a 1926 play by Croatian playwright Milan Begović. Two film adaptations were released in 1961, one by Šime Šimatović and the other by Zvonimir Bajsić.

A stage production of the play was held in 2023 at the Croatian National Theater in Zagreb. It was directed by Helena Petković and starred Jadranka Đokić, Silvio Vovk, and Goran Grgić.

== Synopsis ==
The play follows a young girl, who is deathly ill and dreams of finding an ideal love. She makes a deal with Death in order to give her time to find it. She is approached by a stranger, who offers to give her the love she so desperately craves. The girl accepts, however what the stranger offers is only dreams and not reality.

== Adaptations ==
Two film adaptations have been made of the play. In 1961, Šime Šimatović released a Croatian-language rendition starring Ana Karić and Boris Buzančić. The film was Šimatović's third feature film. Contemporary reception was mixed, with some critics praising the ambition to create a typically-Zagrebian "discursive film" with "elements of surrealist fantasy, [unusual] among Croatian filmmakers of that time", while others regretted that "Šimatović showed more concern for the external splendour of bourgeois settings and way of life than for the metaphysical suggestions of the play and its strong erotic charge".

The same year another Croatian-language adaptation, Adventurer at the Door, directed by Zvonimir Bajsić, starring Zlatko Crnković, Božidar Smiljanić and Fabijan Šovagović, was broadcast on television.
