= Zdenka Rubinstein =

Croatian operatic singer

- Born: 19 November 1911; Zagreb, Kingdom of Croatia-Slavonia, Austria-Hungary
- Died: 31 July 1961 (aged 49); Osijek, PR Croatia, FPR Yugoslavia
- Education: University of Music and Performing Arts, Vienna
- Occupation: Opera singer (soprano)
- Spouse: Bartold Rubinstein
- Children: Mira Rubinstein

Zdenka Rubinstein (born Büchler; 19 November 1911 – 31 July 1961) was a Croatian Jewish operatic soprano.

== Early life, family and death ==
Rubinstein was born in Zagreb on 19 November 1911. In 1933 she married Bartold Rubinstein at the Osijek Synagogue. Her husband's Orthodox Jewish family believed it unacceptable that their daughter-in-law performed in theatres. In 1934 her daughter Mira Rubinstein was born. In an attempt to save and protect his family from antisemitism and persecution, Bartold Rubinstein converted his family to Catholicism. In 1941, during World War II, the NDH began to implement race laws that prevented Rubinstein from singing and performing. She was expelled and banned from the Croatian National Theatre in Osijek, and her family was evicted from their apartment in the center of Osijek. Many members of her family were murdered during The Holocaust; Rubinstein and her immediate family survived. After the war her husband was designated minister of architecture of the newly founded Socialist Federal Republic of Yugoslavia, but on the journey from Zagreb to Osijek (which took several days because of destroyed railroads) he was infected with typhus, and he died some days later. Rubinstein's daughter Mira died in childbirth in Zagreb, and her child died with her. Devastated by these losses, Rubinstein stopped performing. She became ill with Parkinson's disease, and in 1961 she killed herself with an overdose of sleeping pills. She was buried in the family tomb with her husband Bartold in the Jewish part of the cemetery Sv. Ana, Osijek.

== Education and career ==
Rubinstein completed elementary and high school in Zagreb and graduated from the University of Music and Performing Arts, Vienna. Before World War II, because of the views of her husband's family, she performed rarely at the Croatian National Theatre in Osijek. From 1945 until her death she performed as a lyric soprano at the Croatian National Theatre in Osijek. Among her major roles were Violetta in Verdi's La traviata, Cio-Cio San in Puccini's Madama Butterfly and Bula in Ero s onoga svijeta by Jakov Gotovac. Her repertoire was wide and demanding. Rubinstein was noted for her powerful voice.

== Bibliography ==
- Kraus, Ognjen (1998). Dva stoljeća povijesti i kulture Židova u Zagrebu i Hrvatskoj. Zagreb: Židovska općina Zagreb. ISBN 953-96836-2-9.
