= Klajn =

Klajn is a surname. Notable people with the surname include:

- Ivan Klajn (1937–2021), Serbian linguist, philologist and language historian
- Mihajlo Klajn (1912–1941), Croatian agronomist and communist
