= Jakov Gotovac =

Croatian composer

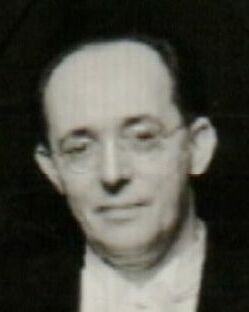
- Gotovac in 1940 at the National Opera of Bulgaria
- Born: October 11, 1895; Split, Kingdom of Dalmatia, Austria-Hungary (now Split, Croatia)
- Died: October 16, 1982 (aged 87); Zagreb, SFR Yugoslavia (now Zagreb, Croatia)
- Occupations: Composer; conductor; pianist

Jakov Gotovac (Croatian pronunciation: [jâkoʋ gǒtovat͡s]; October 11, 1895 – October 16, 1982) was a Croatian composer and conductor of classical music. His comedic opera, Ero s onoga svijeta (Ero the Joker), Croatia's best-known opera, was first performed in Zagreb in 1935.

== Biography ==
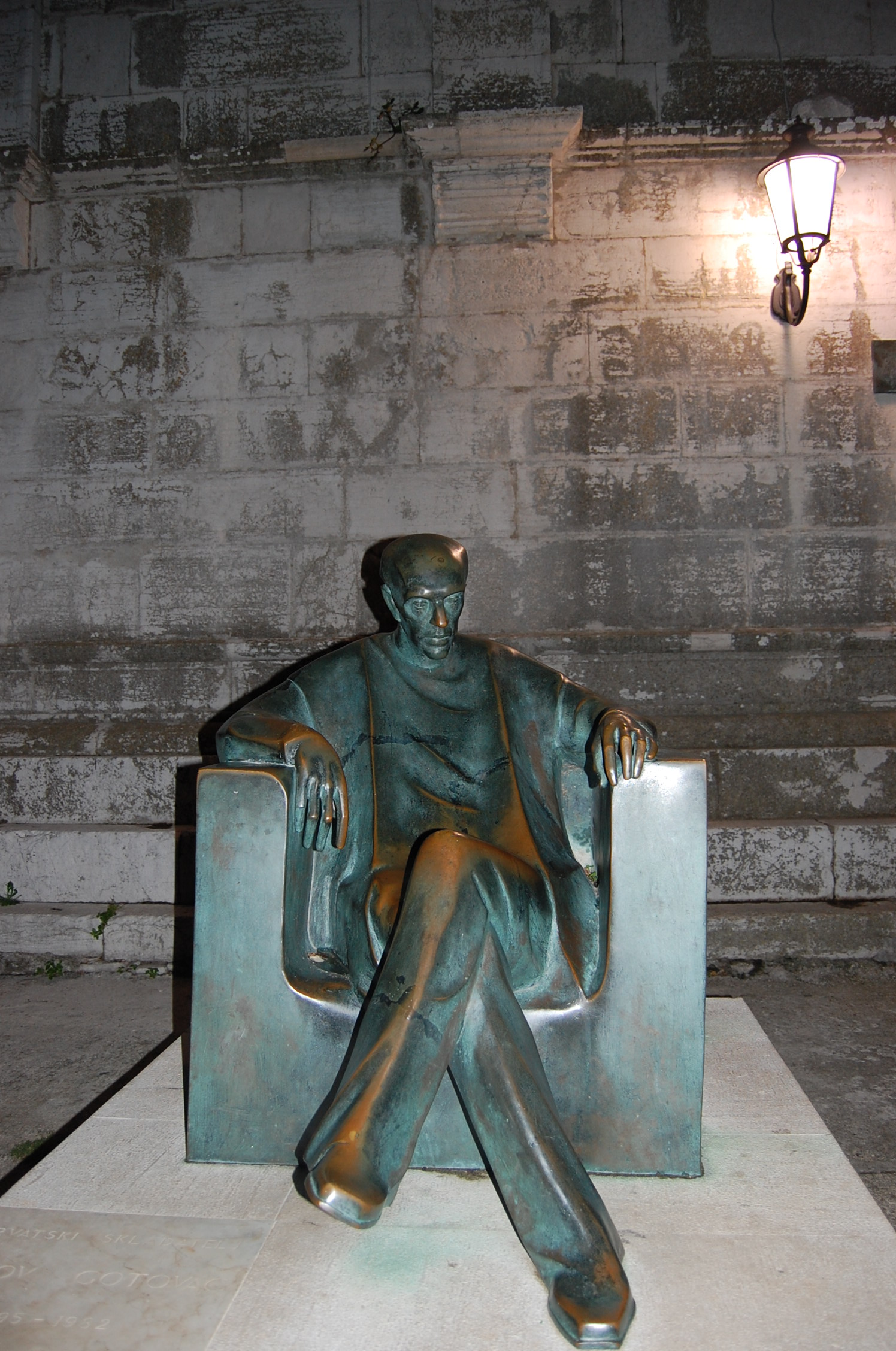
Monument to Jakov Gotovac in Osor

Gotovac was born in Split (then part of Austria-Hungary) and initially had little if any formal education in music. He was fortunate to be encouraged and supported by Josip Hatze, Cyril Metoděj Hrazdira and Antun Dobronić who instilled him with a nationalistic orientation in music. He started as a law student in Zagreb, but switched to writing music in 1920. In Vienna, he studied in the class of Joseph Marx.

Back home, in 1922 he worked with Masaryk's Philharmonia Society Kolo founded in Šibenik by Vice Iljadica in 1899. In 1923 he moved to Zagreb, where he kept working both as conductor and composer until his death. Between 1923 and 1958, he was the opera conductor at the Croatian National Theatre (Hrvatsko narodno kazalište), and leader of an academic musical society Mladost, and of the choir Vladimir Nazor.

His best-known work is Ero s onoga svijeta (a libretto written by Milan Begović) which has been performed on all continents except Australia, and has been translated into nine languages. It has been performed in more than 80 theatres in Europe alone. He also wrote numerous other works for orchestra as well as vocal music, piano pieces, and others.

In his works, Gotovac represents the late national romanticism, with Croatian folklore being the main source of ideas and inspiration. Musically, he prefers homophonic textures and fairly simple harmonic structures in keeping with the folk idiom he admired.

Gotovac died at the age of 87 in Zagreb (then SFR Yugoslavia). He is buried at Mirogoj Cemetery.

== Works ==
=== Orchestral works ===
- Simfonijsko kolo (Symphonic kolo), Op. 12 (1926)
- Pjesma i ples s Balkana (Song and Dance from the Balkans), Op. 16 (1939)
- Orači (Men and ploughs), Op. 18 (1937)
- Guslar (Gusle player), Op. 22 (1940)
- Dinarka (Lady from Dinara) (1945)
- Plesovi od Bunjevaca (The dances from Bunjevci) (1960)

=== Choral works ===
- 2 Scherzos (1916)
- 2 pjesme za muški zbor (2 songs for men's choir) (1918)
- 2 pjesme čuda i smijeha (2 songs of wonder and joy) (1924)
- Koleda (1925)
- Dubravka: Pastorale for Choir & Orchestra, text from Ivan Gundulić, Op. 13 (1927–28)
- 3 momačka zbora (3 choruses for boys' voices) (1932)
- Pjesme vječnog jada (Songs of Eternal Sorrow) (1939)
- Pjesme zanosa (Songs of Excitement) (1955)

=== Vocal solo works ===
- Djevojka i mjesec (A girl and the moon) for alto & orchestra (1917)
- Erotski moment za glas i glasovir (Erotic Moments for voice & piano) (1929)
- 2 Sonate za bariton i orkestar (2 sonatas for baritone & orchestra) (1921)
- Pjesme djevojčice za jedan glas i glasovir (Songs for girl's voice & piano) (1923)
- Gradom za glas i glasovir (Through the Town for voice & piano)
- Rizvan-aga za bariton i orkestar (Rizvan-aga for bariton & orchestra (1938)
- Pjesme čežnje za glas i orkestar (Songs of Passion for voice & orchestra) (1939)

=== Operatic works ===
- Morana, Op. 14 (1928–30)
- Ero s onoga svijeta (Ero the Joker), Op. 17 (1933–35)
- Kamenik, Op. 23 (1939–44; UA 1946)
- Mila Gojsalića, Op. 28 (1948–51; UA 1952)
- Đerdan, Op. 30 (1954–55)
- Dalmaro, Op. 32 (1958; UA 1964)
- Stanac, Op. 33 (1959)
- Petar Svačić. Opera-Oratorij (opera oratorio, Op. 35 (1969; 1971)
