= Antun Dobronić =

Croatian composer

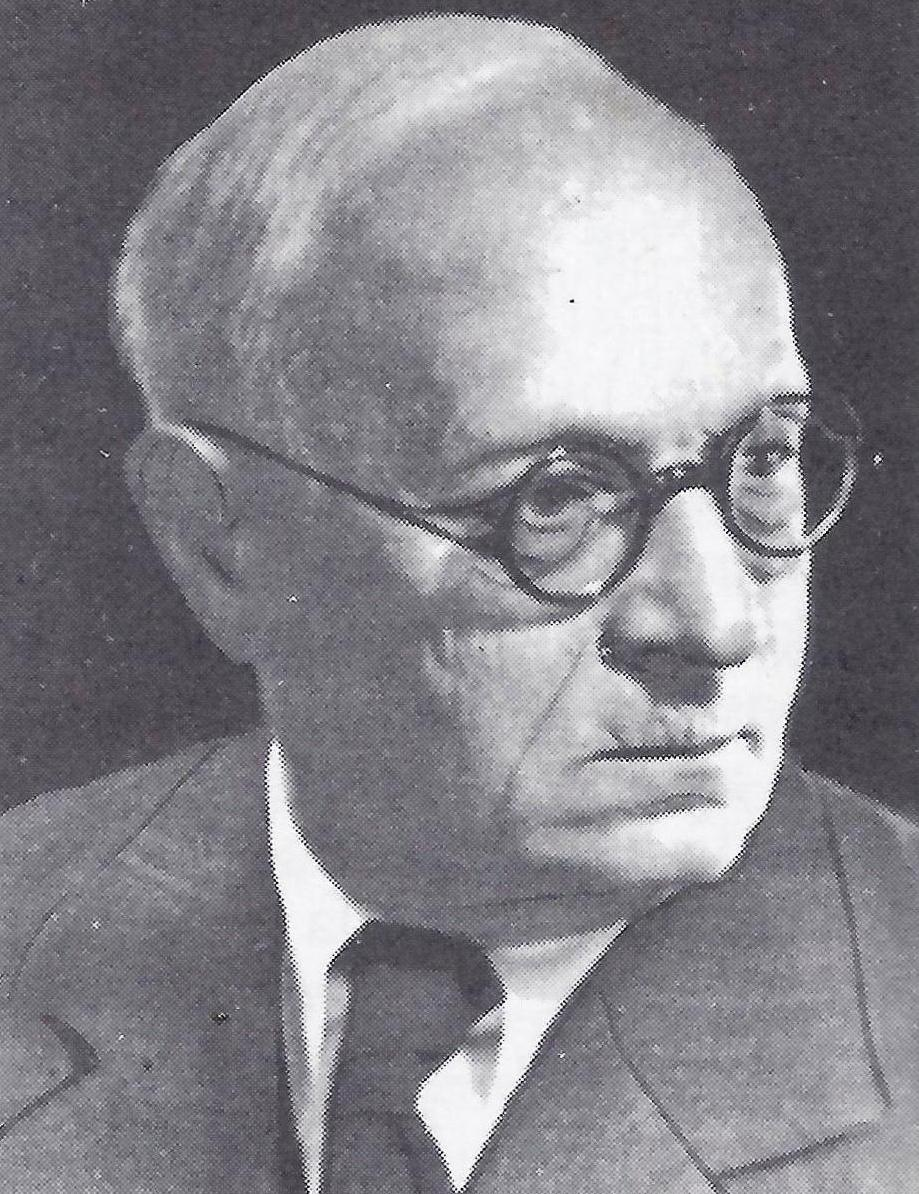
- Born: April 2, 1878; Jelsa, Croatia, Kingdom of Dalmatia, Austria-Hungary (now Jelsa, Croatia)
- Died: December 12, 1955 (aged 77); Zagreb, SFR Yugoslavia (now Zagreb, Croatia)
- Era: 20th century
- Works: http://quercus.mic.hr/quercus/person/236

Antun Dobronić (Croatian pronunciation: [ǎntuːn dǒbronit͡ɕ]; 2 April 1878 – 12 December 1955) was a Croatian composer and pupil of Vítězslav Novák. He studied at the Prague Conservatory from 1910 to 1912. From 1922 to 1940, he served as professor at the Zagreb Academy of Music. His works show a strong streak of Croatian nationalism, which also is manifest in his writings on music. He sought to integrate high culture music techniques with traditional Croatian folk elements.

Dobronić was a prolific composer. He composed eight symphonies and six ballets. He also composed operas, chamber music, and works for choirs.

== Biography ==
Dobronić was born on April 2, 1878, the ninth and last child of the family of Prošper and Barbara (née Selem). He had his first contact with music listening to two Jelsa (Hvar) brass bands. He had his first lesson in music from a priest, Pavao Matijević, and went on studying by himself with the help of various textbooks, and later on by correspondence as well. From time to time he went to Split to have lessons from the composer Josip Hatze. He studied to be a teacher in the Normal School in Arbanasi near Zadar. He had his first position as a teacher on Hvar Island in the villages of Gdinj and Vrisnik, then on the island of Vis, and in Drniš. He was very active in these places and founded and ran choirs and orchestras. He also wrote for the press, and had a number of articles about the advancement of education published, as well as about the theory and practice of music and music life. While he was school-teaching in Drniš, from his field research into vernacular singing, Dobronić wrote a lengthy study about the idiosyncratic form of singing practised in the Drniš region called ojkanje. He argued that ojkanje was a primary element in music, or rather, the first phase of the art of music among the Croats. He collected and wrote down vernacular songs from Dalmatia, particularly from Jelsa and Hvar Island.

Leaving for Prague to study composition at the Conservatory was a watershed moment in Dobronić's creative life. He arrived in Prague in autumn 1910 and went straight into the third year. He learned composition from Karel Sticker (1861 – 1918), conducting from František Spilek (1877 – 1960). The following year he moved to the master class of the then leading figure of modern Czech music, Vítězslav Novák (1870 – 1949) who became the key figure in the shaping of his manner of composition. In 1912 he completed his course by conducting his own symphonic composition Calling into the Round Dance, at a concert in the Rudolfinum.

The year 1916 occupies a special place in Dobronić's biography for it was marked by three major cultural events. On February 5 the First Symphony Concert of Young Croatian Composers was held; in addition to works by the composers Krešimir Baranović, Božidar Širola, Franjo Dugan, Svetislav Stančić and Dora Pejačević, Dobronić's symphonic portrait Carnevale had its first performance. For Dobronić, this appearance was a triumph, and the best entrée he could have had into Zagreb music life. The concert also marked a turning point in his private life for that evening he made the acquaintance of Jerka Marković, a piano teacher, who a few years later was to become his wife. At the next concert, April 1, vocal works of young composers introduced at the historic concert were performed. The Dobronić works performed were choral pieces from the collection Songs of Unrealised Love.

Even after this colossal success in Zagreb, the young composer had to wait a few more years before making his much-desired move to the capital. He went to Arbanasi, near Zadar, where he worked as music teacher in the Normal School, wrote about music and composed vigorously. At that time his solo song cycles Girlish Dream Visions and Dilberke, the First String Quartet and his first opera Suton (Twilight). In 1918 he was at last able to move to Zagreb, the metropolis of musical life in Croatia. He got a job as teacher at the Male Normal School, ran the male students’ choir Mladost, and wrote numbers of articles about the advancement of education, the reform of the opera of the Croatian National Theatre and the Zagreb Conservatory. In 1923, he was appointed professor of composition at the Music Academy, a post which he held until his retirement in 1940.

He died on December 12, 1955.

== Oeuvre ==
His oeuvre comprises more than 180 compositions for various ensembles, including 8 symphonies, 5 string quartets, 12 cantatas, a larger number of choral pieces, solo songs, 13 operas and 5 ballets, works for smaller ensembles and solo instruments. His musical style is characterised by a combination of the Neoclassicist form of expression and the features of the national course. The works for small ensembles gave him breathing space before going on with the big forms – the operas and the symphonies. He championed the idea that the symphony should make its way into opera, seeing in that the only salvation for the operatic form, and called his own operas symphonic dramas, dramatic lyrics or music-theatre tragedies. His vocal art ranged from the late Romantic vocal lyric to a reduction of the melodic line to such an extent that it would sometimes cross the border into recitative. In his symphonic works he painted the national melodies he used with bold orchestration and for the names of the movements he often used non-musical terminology of a programmatic nature. He wrote a large number of works for the choir, with particular attention being drawn by four collections containing more than 100 harmonised or arranged folk songs. In the five string quartets written between 1917 and 1947 it is possible to see the evolution of his composing style; the five symphonies created from 1937 to the end of his life describe Dobronić's mature composerly thinking.

== Selected works ==
- 8 symphonies
- Karneval (Carnival) tonal portrait for symphony orchestra (1913)
- Jelsonski Tonci (Dances from Jelsa)
- Beg Ivan-beg and His Faithful Woman, cantata for orchestra, choir, soprano and tenor solo
- Requiem based on Old Croatian Folk Chorale of Kraljevica (1936)
- Forward, cantata for choir, soloists and orchestra (1951)
- Love Songs, four song cycle for soprano and piano Op 16 (1917)
- Carnival Night, musical theatre satire in three acts (1945)
- Stabat Mater, oratorio in two parts (letters honouring the pain and sorrow of the Virgin Mary) (1937)
- Old Dances in New Attire, symphonic suite for chamber orchestra with folk instruments (1948)
- Jernej the Servant, stage oratorio in three acts (six scenes) with preludes and interludes (1946)
- The Fire of Passion, tragic musical theatre in three scenes (1933)
- Dubravka, music for pastoral play by Gundulic (1922)
- Equinox, opera in four scenes with intermezzo (1938)
- Mother, epic musical theatre in two acts (nine scenes) (1948)
