= Ero s onoga svijeta =

1935 opera by Jakov Gotovac

Ero the Joker
- Comic opera by Jakov Gotovac
- Native title: Ero s onoga svijeta
- Librettist: Milan Begović
- Language: Croatian
- Based on: "Ero s onoga svijeta" by an unknown author
- Premiere: 2 November 1935; Croatian National Theatre, Zagreb

Ero s onoga svijeta (Croatian for 'Ero from the Other World'), usually translated as Ero the Joker, is a Croatian comic opera in three acts by Jakov Gotovac, with a libretto by Milan Begović based on a folk tale. The genesis of the opera was at Vrlička Česma in the town of Vrlika, a hometown of Milan Begović.

According to Croatian musicologist Josip Andreis, Ero s onoga svijeta is "not only the most successful Croatian comic opera to this day, but also the only Croatian opera with a presence in the theaters abroad". American musicologist and music critic Ralph P. Locke described it as one of two major Croatian operas, alongside Nikola Šubić Zrinski.

== Characters ==
- Marko, rich peasant, bass
- Doma, his second wife, mezzo-soprano
- Đula (Djula), Marko's daughter from the first marriage, soprano
- Mića (Ero), young man from the nearby village, tenor
- Sima, millman, baritone
- Shepherd boy, child soprano
- A young man, tenor
- girls (6 solos), women (8 solos), men, shepherds, fruit-merchants (4 solos), merchants (4 solos), children and other village people.

The opera takes place in a small town, somewhere in the plain at the foothill of Dinara mountain in Herzegovina, in early autumn.

== Orchestra ==
- 3 flutes (III doubles piccolo), 2 oboes, cor anglais, 3 clarinets, 2 bassoons (II doubles contrabassoon)
- 4 French horns in F, 3 trumpets in C, 3 trombones, tuba
- Timpani, percussion, pedal harp, piano
- Violins I & II, violas, cellos, double basses
- On stage: organ

== History ==
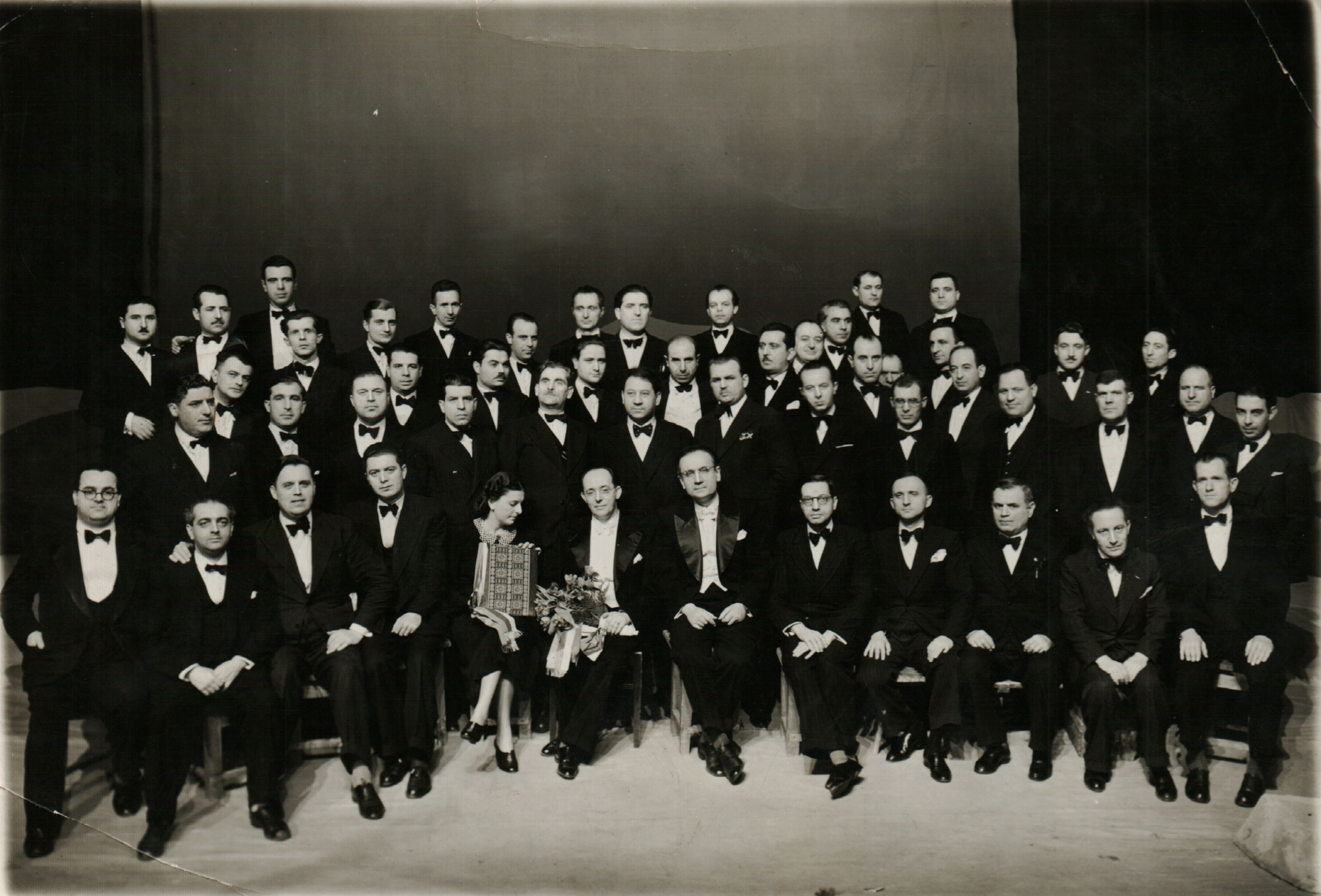
The National Opera of Bulgaria in Sofia after the premiere of Ero s onoga svijeta with composer Jakov Gotovac, April 1940

Composition of the opera began on October 10, 1932, and progressed in three stages, being finished on May 8, 1935. The first performance was on November 2, 1935, at the Croatian National Theatre, Zagreb, and the opera has since become the most performed work of South Slavic music literature.

The first performance was conducted by Gotovac himself, and he felt that the opera was nicely received by the audience. In Novosti, Milan Katić described the opera in superlatives, and in Belgrade Pravda Stražičić shared this positive sentiment. An often-quoted dismissive opinion ("And again a Croatian composer wrote an opera in vain") allegedly found in Lujo Šafranek-Kavić's review in Jutarnji list, a Zagreb-based newspaper, has been found by recent research to be a fabrication. The actual review was generally very positive, with Šafranek-Kavić giving particular praise to Gotovac's score, while having reservations about the quality of the libretto.

Ero the Joker saw its first performance outside Yugoslavia in Brno, Czechoslovakia, translated into Czech in 1936, and after that it came back to the National Theater (Narodno pozorište) in Belgrade, Yugoslavia on April 17, 1937. It was next put on stage more than ten years later, on February 27, 1948, in the Serbian National Theatre (Srpsko narodno pozorište) in Novi Sad where it has been put on five times since. All totaled, Ero the Joker has found its way to the stages of more than 80 world theaters, and has been translated into 9 languages. Between 1935 and 2010 it has seen 660 performances in the Croatian National Theatre in Zagreb alone.

== Synopsis ==
=== Act 1 ===
On the threshing floor of a rich peasant, Marko, young women are singing while threshing grain. Only master Marko's daughter Djula is sad because her mother had died and her stepmother, Doma, does not care for her at all. Djula's voice awakes Mića, a young man whom nobody knows.

While the women are comforting Djula and starting to sing again, Mića slides down from a big haystack on which he had been lying unnoticed – as if he had fallen from the sky. The superstitious women believe him when he says: "I am Ero from another world!"

He starts weaving a story about life "up there" and delivering messages from their deceased loved ones. Djula's stepmother comes out and complains about their idleness. However, Mića convinces her to return to the kitchen by deceit. Left alone with Djula, he tells her that her late mother has chosen him to be her husband.

While they are discussing how to get her father, Marko, to consent to their marriage, her father himself appears and drives Mića off, refusing to give shelter to the scoundrel.

Doma, who had also heard of this young man from "another world", seeks out Mića and asks him about her late husband, Matija. Mića tells her that, having heard about her new marriage and her lack of respect for him, Matija is furious. Mića adds that his pockets are empty and Doma, in a pang of conscience, hands him a sock full of gold coins to give to Matija when he sees him next. Mića joyfully leaves. However, when Marko finds out about the money, he gathers men to go after Mića.

=== Act 2 ===
At the local mill, Sima, the miller, mills and sings joyfully as the women start gathering. Each one of them claims to be in a rush and Sima doesn't know how to please them all. When Doma arrives with Djula, she insists they be served at once, which leads to an all-round quarrel. Djula tries to calm her stepmother down, but Doma doesn't listen and leaves fuming. Djula laments after her ill fate and Sima comforts her before she leaves with the other women.

Then, we see Mića on the run. He had disguised himself as a miller's apprentice. When the angry mob catches up with him, they are unable to recognize him and Mića tells them he had seen someone running towards the mountains. The mob decides to leave their horses behind and continue the pursuit on foot. Then, Djula appears, and Mića assures her that he had taken the coins just to make as a ruse, and then persuades her to run away with him. When Marko and men return, a young shepherd informs them that he saw Mića and Djula fleeing on Marko's horse.

=== Act 3 ===
At the fair, a throng howls cheerfully. Marko and Doma arrive quarrelling, since he does not want to give her any money for shopping. She leaves exasperated. Sima, the miller, approaches Marko and tells him that Djula had married a rich boy from the neighbouring village with whom she now lives happily.

Djula longs to see her father again, but Mića refuses to take her home without Marko's invitation. Marko agrees to send for them, and when Mića and Djula arrive, the villagers give them a warm reception.

Finally, Mića decides to tell his true story. Following his mother's advice, he left home pretending to be a poor boy, hoping to find a girl who will love him simply for who he is. He gives back Marko's horse and hands him the gold coins he had taken from him, and asks for Marko's blessing. Marko forgives him and is happy for the young couple. A big celebration erupts and the story comes to an end with a great kolo finale.

== Musical numbers ==
- Vidjele ste, sidjoh odozgora – You've seen it, I've come from above (Mića's aria – act 1)
- Ja sam ti o Gjurgjevu dne – It was I who on St George's Day (Duetto of Mića i Djula – act 1)
- Brblje voda, žrvnji rokću – Water's bubbling, millstones are grunting (Sima's arioso – act 2)
- Majko, majčice – Mother, o' sweet mother (Djula's aria – act 2)
- Žene, đerdan, marame, šudari – Women, here's necklace, scarves, earrings (Sellers at Fair [chorus] – act 3)
- Oj! Što su mome, Ero, za kradenje – Hey! Are girls meant to be stolen, Ero (Entrance of Mića and Djula – act 3)
- Ti znaš, Mića, kad sam djete bila – You know, Mića, when I was a child (Djula's aria – act 3)
- Mene moja majka svjetovala – My mother advised me (Mića's arioso – act 3)
- Što na nebu sja visoko – What's that shining high in the skies (finale – dance [chorus] – act 3)
