= Milan Begović =

Croatian novelist (1876–1948)

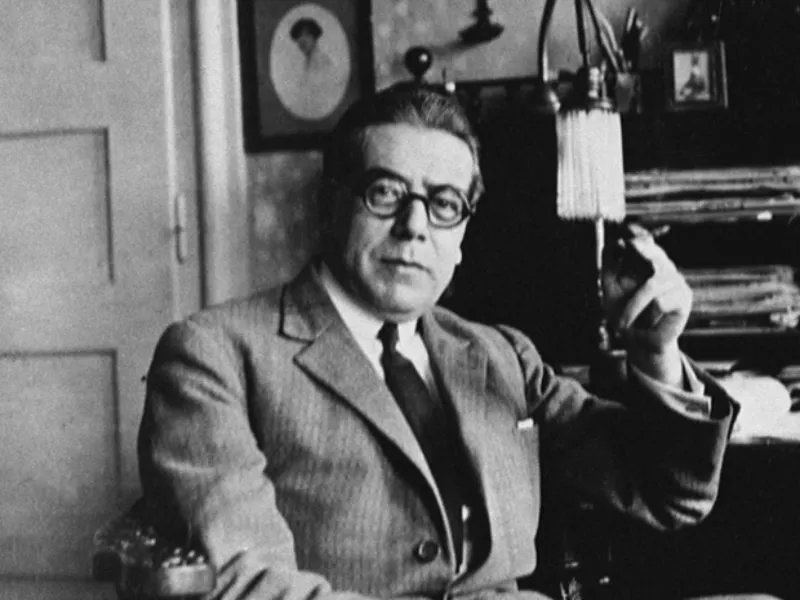
- Born: January 19, 1876; Vrlika, Kingdom of Croatia-Slavonia, Austria-Hungary (now Vrlika, Croatia)
- Died: May 13, 1948 (aged 72); Zagreb, Yugoslavia (now Zagreb, Croatia)
- Resting place: Mirogoj Cemetery
- Occupations: translator, author, playwright
- Spouses: Paula Goršetić (m. 1900; div. 1923); Anna Maria "Annerl" Spitzer (m. 1923; div. 1928); Danica "Šiša" Rabenhalt (m. 1928)
- Writing career
- Pen name: Tugomir Cetinski; Xeres de la Maraja; Stanko Dušić
- Language: Croatian

Milan Begović (Croatian pronunciation: [mǐlan běgoʋit͡ɕ]; January 19, 1876 – May 13, 1948) was a Croatian novelist, playwright, translator, and lyricist.

== Biography ==
Begović was born in Vrlika, Kingdom of Croatia-Slavonia, then a part of the Austro-Hungarian Empire, in 1876, the son of Ivan, a smallholder and shopkeeper, and Filomena "File" (née Bressan).

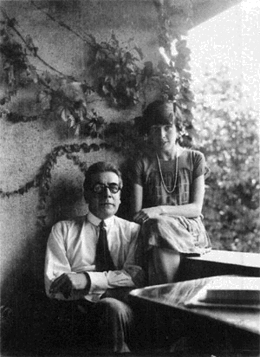
Begović and Spitzer in their Zagreb apartment

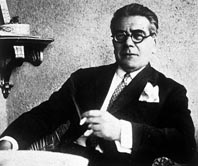
Begović later in life

In 1894, he enrolled at the University of Zagreb studying natural sciences. He dropped out in 1896, working as a substitute teacher at a gymnasium in Split. In 1900, he graduated from the Velika realka in Split and married his first wife, pianist Paula (née Goršetić), whom he had met in Zagreb during his studies. The following year, his daughter Božena was born. He then enrolled in the Romance linguistics programme in Vienna, graduating in 1903. In 1905, he fathered a son, Branko.

During these years, Begović travelled throughout Europe alone, which he considered necessary for personal development, but, in 1909, he was invited to Hamburg at the behest of Baron Alfred von Berger, director of the Deutsches Schauspielhaus. This time did not lend itself to Begović developing original works, but he later recalled that the time had been comfortable and that he had learned a lot while working there. He and his family were also relatively well-off and had a reliable income; Begović was later known for his exceptionally poor financial management. Also while in Hamburg, he wrote for several periodicals, primarily the Hamburger Nachrichten.

When his contract in Hamburg finished in 1912, the family moved to Vienna. This period in Begović's life was marked with constant change, both personal and professional. In 1913, Begović was hired by the Serbian National Theatre in Novi Sad as a contract playwright and chief director, but it was shortly lived. He is recorded as having received a salary from the Velika Gymnasium in Sarajevo from 1914 until the collapse of Austria-Hungary. During World War I, he served in the Austro-Hungarian Army, serving primarily as a quartermaster until 1918, where he served with the Yugoslav forces during its mission to Vienna. In 1918, his third child — a son, Bruno — was born from an affair he had with Anna Marie Spitzer, his later-wife twenty years his junior, whom he had met in Vienna. After his separation from Paula, he and Spitzer moved to Zagreb. From 1921 until 1922, he was an editor and publisher with Ljubo Wiesner at Kritika magazine and a member of the editorial staff for the daily paper Novosti. In 1923, he was granted a divorce from Paula and immediately married Spitzer, with Miroslav Krleža as his best man. The same year, he began editing Savremenik, with Antun Bonifačić later becoming co-editor in 1932.

In Zagreb, Begović wrote many of his best-known works, including Man of God (Croatian: Božji čovjek) in 1924 and Adventurer at the Door (Croatian: Pustolov pred vratama) in 1926. In 1927, after several attempts, he succeeded in becoming director of drama at the Croatian National Theatre. However, the political motifs in his work, particularly those found in his theatre adaption of August Šenoa's Croatian Diogenes (Croatian: Hrvatski Diogenes), were at odds with the political climate and he was dismissed the following year. Ten years after meeting Spitzer, in 1928, Begović met his third wife, Danica Rabenhalt. She was 26 years his junior — a year younger than his oldest child, Božena. He would teach at a gymnasium from 1929 until his retirement in 1932.

The two lived in Bisag from his retirement in 1932 until 1938. With the establishment of communist Yugoslavia in 1945, the Croatian Writers' Association judged that Begović had collaborated with the war-time Independent State of Croatia.

Begović died in Zagreb of a stroke in 1948 and, due to his falling out with the regime, his death was neither announced nor given special honours. He is buried at Mirogoj Cemetery.

Today, his best known titles are his drama Adventurer at the Door (Croatian: Pustolov pred vratima, 1926) and his comedy American Yacht in Split Harbour (Croatian: Amerikanska jahta u splitskoj luci, 1930). In his collaborative efforts, he is best known, even outside of Croatia, for writing the lyrics to the opera Ero the Joker.

== Selected works ==
- The Book Boccadoro (Croatian: Knjiga Boccadoro, 1900)
- A Life for the Tsar (Croatian: Život za cara, 1904)
- The Biučić Apartment (Croatian: Stan Biučić, 1909)
- Little Comedies (Croatian: Male komedije, 1921)
  - Minuet (Croatian: Menuet)
  - Venus the Victoress (Croatian: Venus victrix)
  - The Bishop's Niece (Croatian: Biskupova sinovica)
- A Quince in a Coffin (Croatian: Dunja u kovčegu, 1921)
- Man of God (Croatian: Božji čovjek, 1924)
- Selected Poems (Croatian: Izabrane pjesme, 1925)
- Adventurer at the Door (Croatian: Pustolov pred vratama, 1926)
- Croatian Diogenes (Croatian: Hrvatski Diogenes, 1928)
- American Yacht in Split Harbour (Croatian: Amerikanska jahta u splitskoj luci, 1930)
- Without a Third (Note: 'Without a Third' as in "without a third person", not as in "missing one-third") (Croatian: Bez trećega, 1931)
- Quartet (Croatian: Kvartet, 1936)
- The Road Through Italy (Croatian: Put po Italiji, 1942)
