= Nikola Đuretić =

Croatian writer and publisher

Nikola Đuretić (born Osijek, Croatia, July 24, 1949) is a Croatian writer and publisher. At the age of five he moved to Zagreb where he graduated in English studies and Comparative Literature. He published his first short stories in the magazine "Polet" in 1968. From 1975 until 1978 he worked as an editor in publishing. In March 1978 he went into exile. For more than twenty years he lived in London, UK, where he worked as a program assistant and senior producer with the BBC. Upon retiring from the BBC in 1999 he returned to Croatia. He is a member of the Croatian Writers' Association and Matrix Croatica. For years he's been a member of the Organizing Committee of the Zagreb Literary Talks which he presided upon from 2008 until 2011.

== Works ==
Đuretić has published thus far more than twenty books of prose, poetry, short stories, essays and feuilleton. He also translated works of the most prominent contemporary English and Irish writers (Salman Rushdie, Penelope Lively, Julian Barnes, Kazuo Ishiguro, Ian McEwan, Beryl Bainbridge, Louis de Bernieres, Hugo Williams, Edward Gordon Craig, Desmond Egan and others).

== Bibliography ==
Short stories and novels:

- Vragolovi, 1974
- Vrijeme bijelih dana, 1978
- Suze Martina Jesenskog, 1997
- Lovac sjena, 2010
- Almanah smrti i nestajanja, 2011 (2013)
- Almanac of Death and Disappearance, 2013
- Posljednja predaja, 2016
- Izabrana djela 1–6, 2019
- Knjiga opasnih pripovijesti, 2019

Poetry:

- Kao zvuk otoka, 2006
- Male smrti ptica, 2008
- Gdje počinju ceste, 2009
- Raspuko se nar, 2011
- Osveta mimoza, 2011
- Crtež vedrine, 2011
- Jesenji prozor, 2012
- Lahor u šašu, 2012
- Plinska lanterna, 2013
- Zvuk tišine, 2014
- Ždral od papira, 2014
- Odlazak/Oproštaj, 2017
- Put u jesen, 2018

Essays and feuilleton:

- Kazališni putokazi i krajputaši, 1996
- Albionske razglednice, 1996
- Iskreno Vaš... zapisi s Otoka, 2004 (2011)
- Između dodira - Bilješke za kroniku jednoga egzila, 2005
- Zavičajni oblog, 2010
- Nerazumni zapisi, 2013
- Ka totalnom teatru, 2015

== Awards ==
- Merit Award - ITO EN Oi Ocha New Haiku Contest, Japan, 2018
- Josip and Ivan Kozarac Award, 2017
- Croatian Academy of Sciences and Arts Award - for the highest scientific and artistic achievements in the Republic of Croatia, 2016
- Visoka žuta žita Award - for the overall literary opus and lasting contribution to Croatian Literature, 2016
- "Dubravko Horvatić Award" - Best Short Story, 2015
- Runner up at the International haiku competition "Vladimir Devide", Japan, 2015
- "Duhovno hrašće" - Best book of poetry for year 2013
- Commendation at the International haiku competition "Vladimir Devide", Japan, 2013
- Commendation - Polish International Haiku Competition 2013
- "Ksaver Šandor Gjalski" Award for the best book of prose for year 2012
- Order of Danica hrvatska s likom Marka Marulića - for contribution to Croatian culture, 1998
- "Marko Marulić" Award for the best first book of short stories, 1974
