= Mihajlo Klajn =

- Born: Mihajlo Klein; 24 August 1912; Osijek, Kingdom of Croatia-Slavonia, Austria-Hungary
- Died: 22 October 1941 (aged 29); Osijek, Independent State of Croatia
- Education: University of Zagreb
- Occupation: Agronomist

Ing. Mihajlo Klajn (born Mihajlo Klein; 1912–1941) was a Yugoslav agronomist and communist who was killed during the Holocaust in the Independent State of Croatia.

Klajn was born on 24 August 1912 in Osijek, Austro-Hungary to a poor Jewish family. In Osijek he finished elementary and high school. In Zagreb Klajn enrolled Faculty of Agriculture at the University of Zagreb. During his study he was emphasized as fair, modest, hard working and persistent person. At the university he joined the Young Communist League of Yugoslavia (SKOJ). He graduated in 1937 and became a member of the Communist Party of Yugoslavia (KPJ). Upon graduation he returned to Osijek where he was employed at the Agricultural Institute Osijek. Klajn published a book "Kako se gaje uljane biljke" (How are grown oilseed plants) in 1938. In Osijek Klajn was named secretary of the provincial committee of the KPJ for eastern Slavonia. His work as a communist and a Jew was noticed by the regime of a newly founded Independent State of Croatia. He was arrested on 22 September 1941. In prison he was heavily tortured and abused. Klajn withstand the torture and never provide the required information about the KPJ organizations and membership. His last words, written in a letter, to his parents were: I'm sorry that I'm dying, but when it has to be, I do not fear at all. I ask you to boldly withstand all life difficulties you may face. I'm sure you will survive. Live for my sake. Live modestly, but with dignity.

Klajn was killed on 22 October 1941 with six of his comrades, he was 29 years old. In 1959 bust of Mihajlo Klajn was revealed at the Faculty of Agriculture, University of Zagreb as an honor to his sacrifice. His studies are now learned at the Faculty of Agriculture, University of Zagreb and Faculty of Agriculture in Osijek. Street in Kneževi Vinogradi is named after Klajn and until 1991 in Osijek (now Trpimirova street).

== Works ==
- Kako se gaje uljane biljke, Seljački bukvar, Beograd 1938

== Bibliography ==
- Romano, Jaša (1980). Jevreji Jugoslavije 1941-1945: žrtve genocida i učesnici narodnooslobodilačkog rata. Beograd: Jevrejski Istorijski Muzej, Saveza jevrejskih opština Jugoslavije.
- Živaković-Kerže, Zlata (2005). Židovi u Osijeku (1918.-1941.). Osijek: Židovska općina Osijek – Tiskara Pauk d.o.o., Cerna. ISBN 953-6659-22-0.
