= Croatian National Theatre, Zagreb =

Theatre and opera house in Zagreb, Croatia

Coordinates: 45°48′34″N 15°58′12″E

Croatian National Theatre in Zagreb
- Hrvatsko narodno kazalište u Zagrebu
- HNK Zagreb
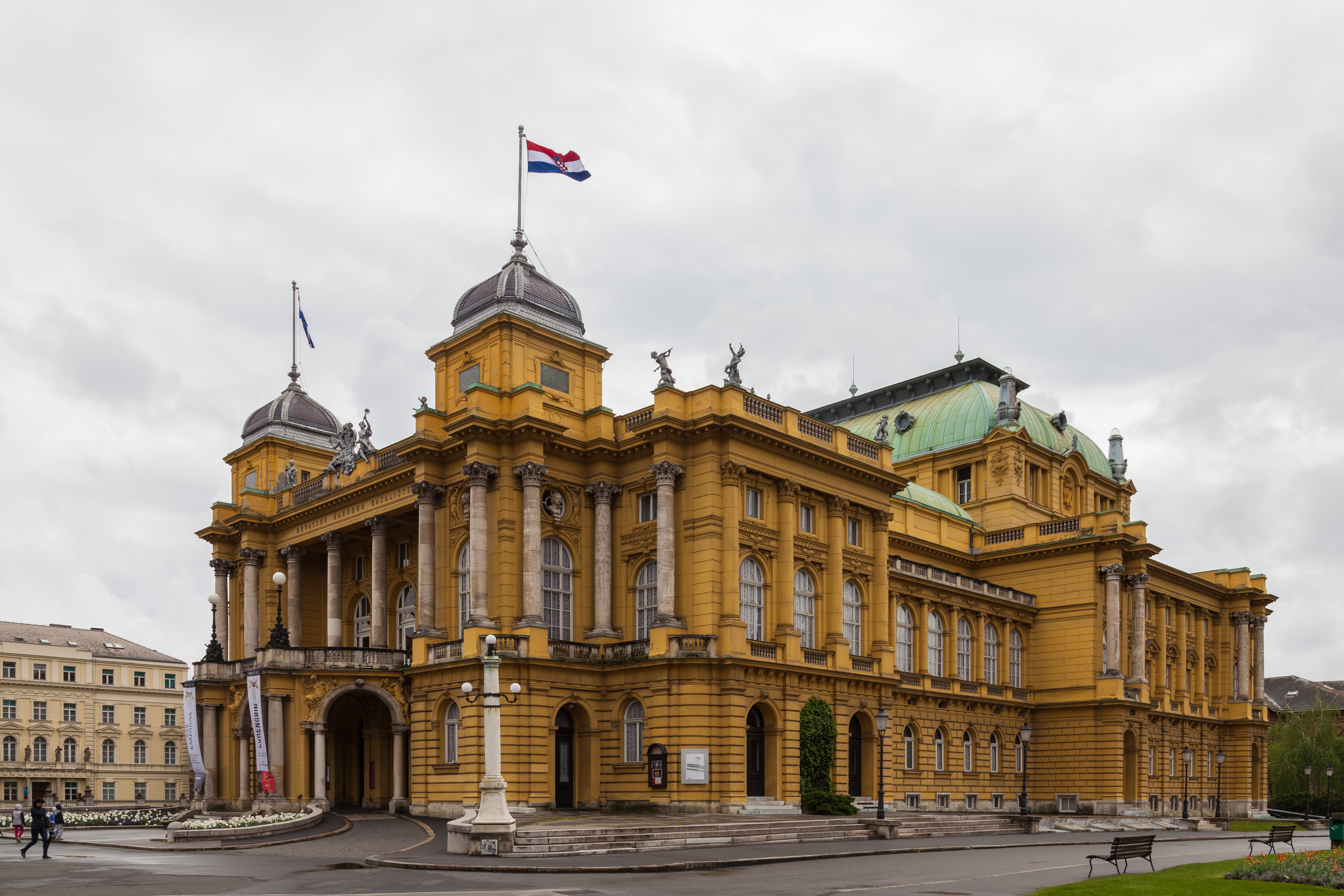
- Croatian National Theatre building in Zagreb
- Interactive map of Croatian National Theatre in Zagreb
- Address: Republic of Croatia Square 15, Zagreb, Croatia
- Owner: Republic of Croatia (51 %); City of Zagreb (49 %)
- Capacity: 715
- Type: National theatre, opera and ballet house

Construction
- Groundbreaking: 22 May 1894
- Opened: 14 October 1895
- Renovated: 1937; 1967–1969
- Architect: Fellner & Helmer

Website
- www.hnk.hr

The Croatian National Theatre in Zagreb (Croatian: Hrvatsko narodno kazalište u Zagrebu), commonly referred to as HNK Zagreb (pronounced [xa en ka]), is a theatre, opera, and ballet house in Zagreb. Located on the centre of Republic of Croatia Square, it is the oldest Croatian theatre institution, officially opening on 24 November 1860.

The Croatian National Theatre is a famous landmark of the city of Zagreb. As the central national theatre, the Croatian National Theatre in Zagreb nurtures a diverse programme. Apart from domestic works, it stages works from the classical, modern, and contemporary world repertoire. It is one of seven national theatres in the country.

With more than twelve premieres and twenty repeat titles, over 200 and twenty stage performances are performed during the season. The Croatian National Theatre in Zagreb is a member of the international network Opera Europa, the FEDORA platform and the European Theatre Convention.

== History ==
=== Stanković Theater ===
The first professional theater in Zagreb was built in 1834 by Zagreb wholesaler and landowner Kristofor Stanković, who in 1833 won the grand prize of 30,000 ducats in the Vienna lottery and decided to build a theater building as a private investment. The theatre evolved out of the first city theatre opened in 1834, housed in the present-day Old City Hall, in the Upper Town. The building was designed by Italian architects, father and son Christofor and Anton Cragnolini, who were engaged in building the Ljubljana national theatre, in the neoclassical style. The first play, Niklas Graf von Zriny by Körner, was performed by a German troupe on 4 October 1834.

As part of the theatre, there was also a ballroom, where the Croatian Parliament sat in 1848. The upper town theatre was the centre of the city's theatrical and cultural life and its capacity was sufficient for the population of the time (more than 750 seats), but the theatre was not technically adequately equipped. A curtain was painted on by Croatian painter Vjekoslav Karas painting. At first, it was lit by candles, then gas in 1864, and finally electricity in 1894. German and Italian troupes performed, and from 1860, with the expulsion of German actors, Croatian plays became the only performances. The building was damaged in the 1880 Zagreb earthquake. In 1881, the Croatian Parliament adopted a law on the construction of a new theatre.

=== Plan and development ===
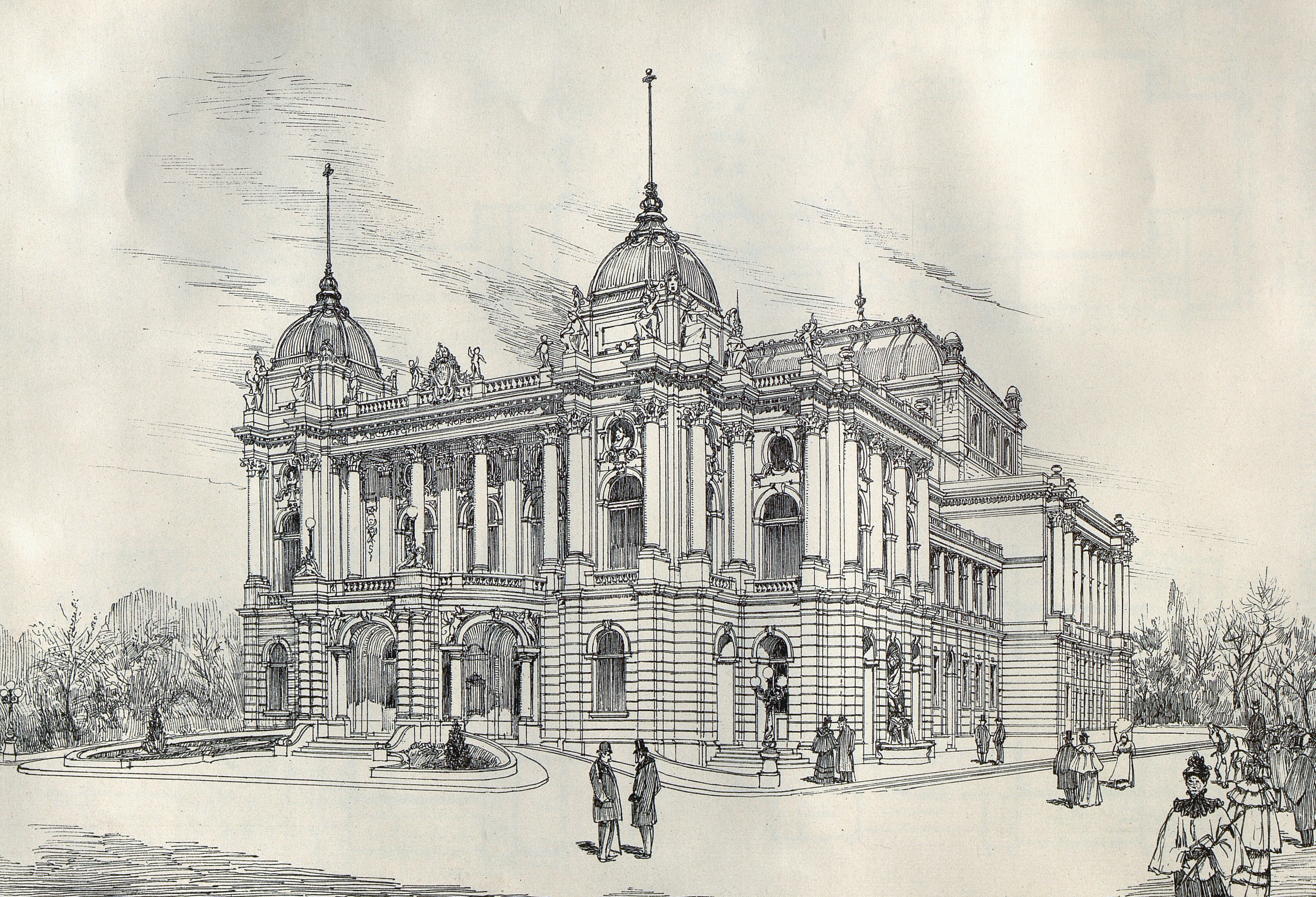
Architectural plan from Fellner & Helmer

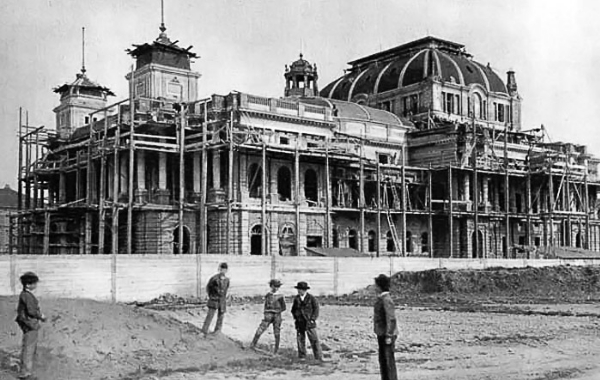
Construction of new theatre, 1894

A fundraising campaign began in April 1880, with Member of Parliament Marijan Derenčin submitting a detailed petition to the Government about the need to construct a new building and commissioned designs from Viennese architects specialising in theater construction, Hermann Helmer and Ferdinand Fellner, who often worked together under Fellner & Helmer, building theatres all around Europe. The Croatian Parliament passed the Law on the Construction of the New National Theatre in Zagreb, which is confirmed by Emperor Franz Joseph I on 31 October. The new Croatian Ban Károly Khuen-Héderváry renews discussions about the location, and includes Izidor Kršnjavi in construction. In 1895, the city's authorities debate on the location, and their debate is interrupted by Khuen-Héderváry's decision to build the future theater on the site of the city fairgrounds, despite the resistance at the time, as it was on the city outskirts, further from the then city centre. In autumn 1893, the Viennese architectural firm Fellner & Helmer submitted a new project, and on 5 January a contract was signed for the construction of the new theatre building. The works were about to begin in spring 1894 and completed by 1 October 1895. The initial scepticism of the location of the new theatre turned out better than expected, and the building was built on today's Republic of Croatia Square which is surrounded by numerous buildings of high monumental value from the late 19th and early 20th centuries.

=== Construction ===
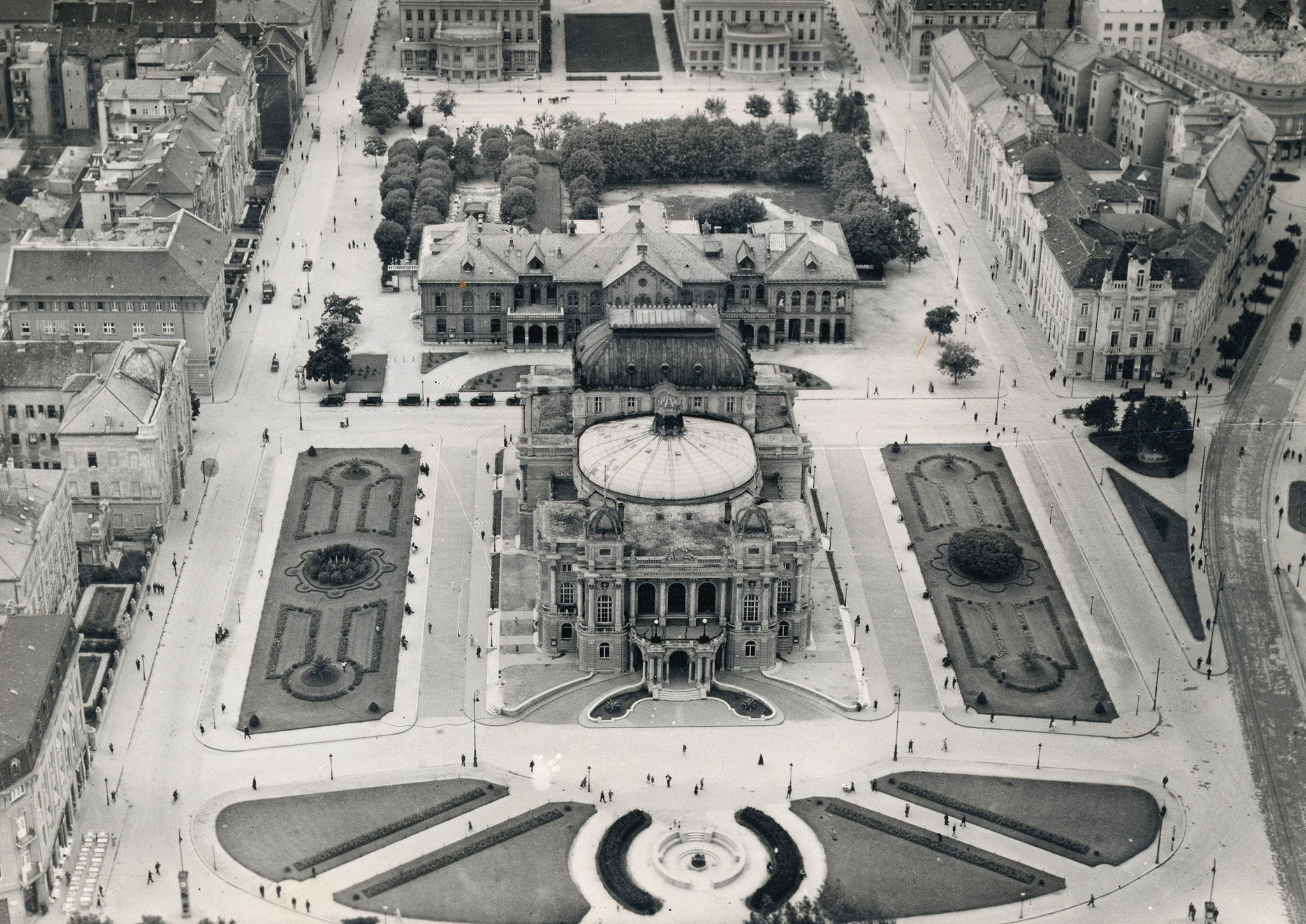
Aerial view of the theatre, 1930s. The building of the Croatian Sokol movement, HPD Kolo as well as extra HNK facilities is in the background.

On 22 May 1894, more than two hundred workers began construction. Within four months, the building was under a roof and interior work began. The ceremonial curtain for the new theater was made by Vlaho Bukovac - Preporod hrvatske književnosti I umjetnosti, today known as Hrvatski narodni preporod. The paintings on the ceiling of the auditorium were done by the Viennese painter and decorator Alexander Demetrius Goltz. The ceiling of the foyer on the first floor is by Ivan Tišov, which were applied in 1911. Stjepan Miletić was the first intendant of the Croatian National Theatre, who would take up his duties at the beginning of the 1894–95 season. The theatre was first established as the Croatian National Theatre in 1860. In 1861, it gained government support, putting it on par with many other European national theatres. An opera company was added to the theatre in 1870, and moved to the new purpose-built building on Republic of Croatia Square in Zagreb's Lower Town in 1875, where it is based today. There are also four busts of Ivan Gundulić and Junij Palmotić from the front of the building, Dimitrije Demeter on the east side and Vatroslav Lisinski on the west side of the building.

=== Opening ===
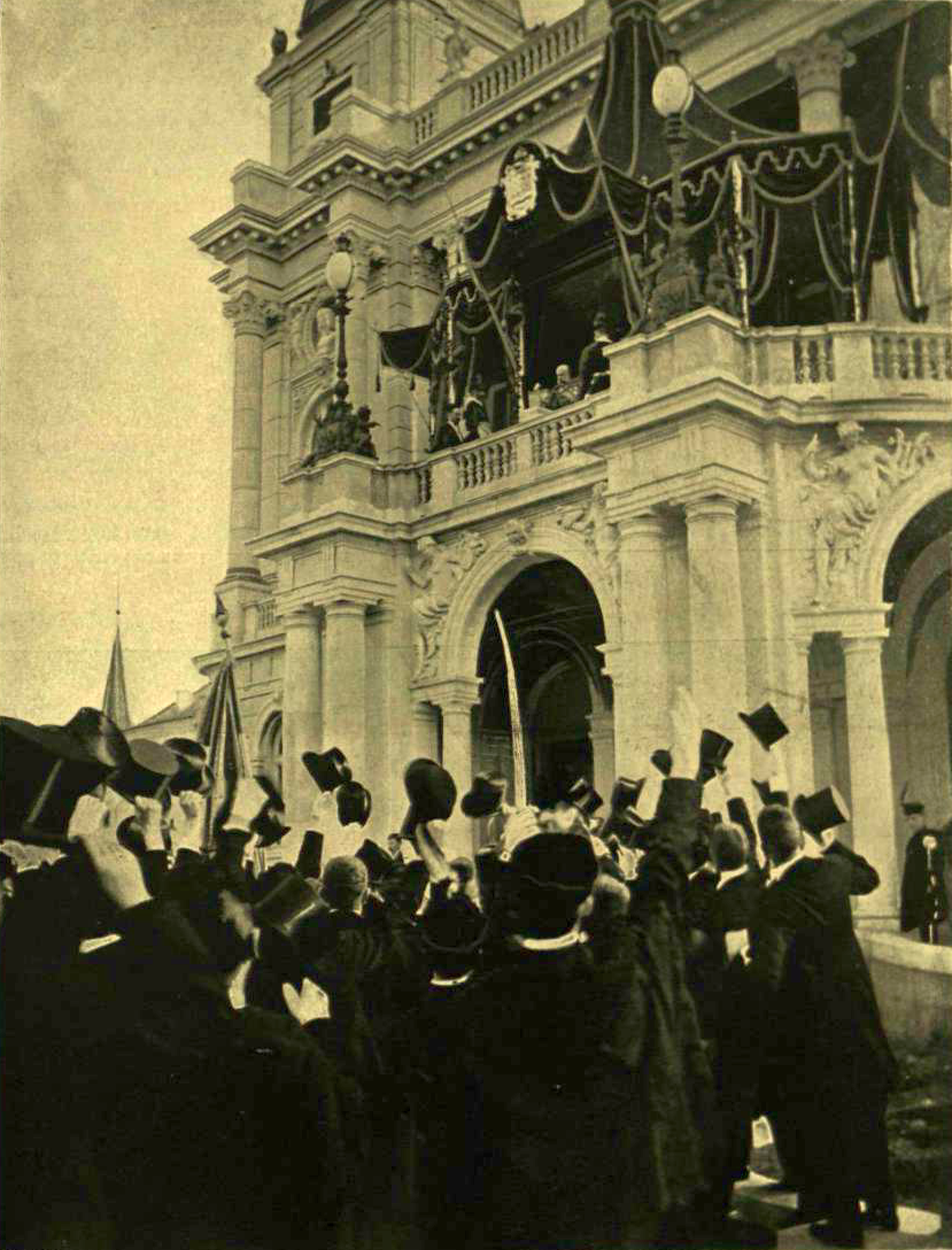
Grand opening of the theatre on November 14, 1895

The theatre officially opened on 14 November 1895. Austro-Hungarian emperor Franz Joseph I was at the unveiling of this new building during his visit to the city in 1895. The first ceremonial performance, also in the presence of the emperor and numerous guests, was held in the new building on the same day at 7 PM titled Slava umjetnosti, and was an allegorical stage prologue in three scenes by Stjepan Miletić with music by Ivan Zajc, in which the first-class performers of the Drama Opera and Ballet performed, and the eighth scene of Zajc's opera Nikola Šubić Zrinjski was also performed.

At the entrance of the theatre is located the wall fountain Well of Life (Zdenac Života), designed by Croatian artist and sculptor Ivan Meštrović in 1905. Sculpture was made in 1905 and exhibited in 1909 in the author's gallery in Ilica street no. 12. In 1912, sculpture was bought by Izidor Kršnjavi and installed on the Republic of Croatia Square. It was placed in the cavity surrounded by walls so that naked bodies on it would not cause astonishment and critical comments of conservative people of Zagreb at that time.

=== From 1945-1950 ===
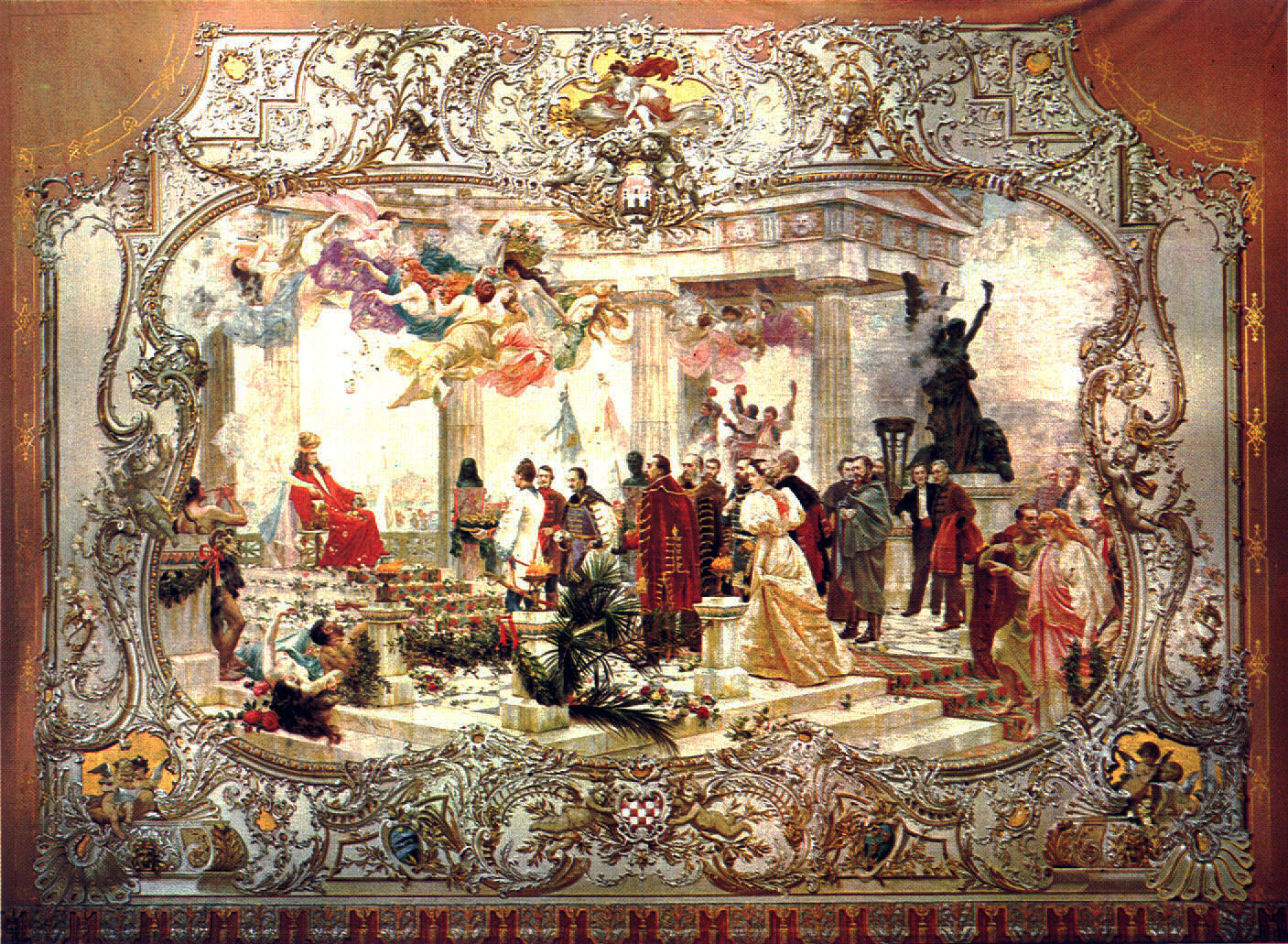
Theatre curtain, with the painting of Vlaho Bukovac's Hrvatski Narodni Preporod

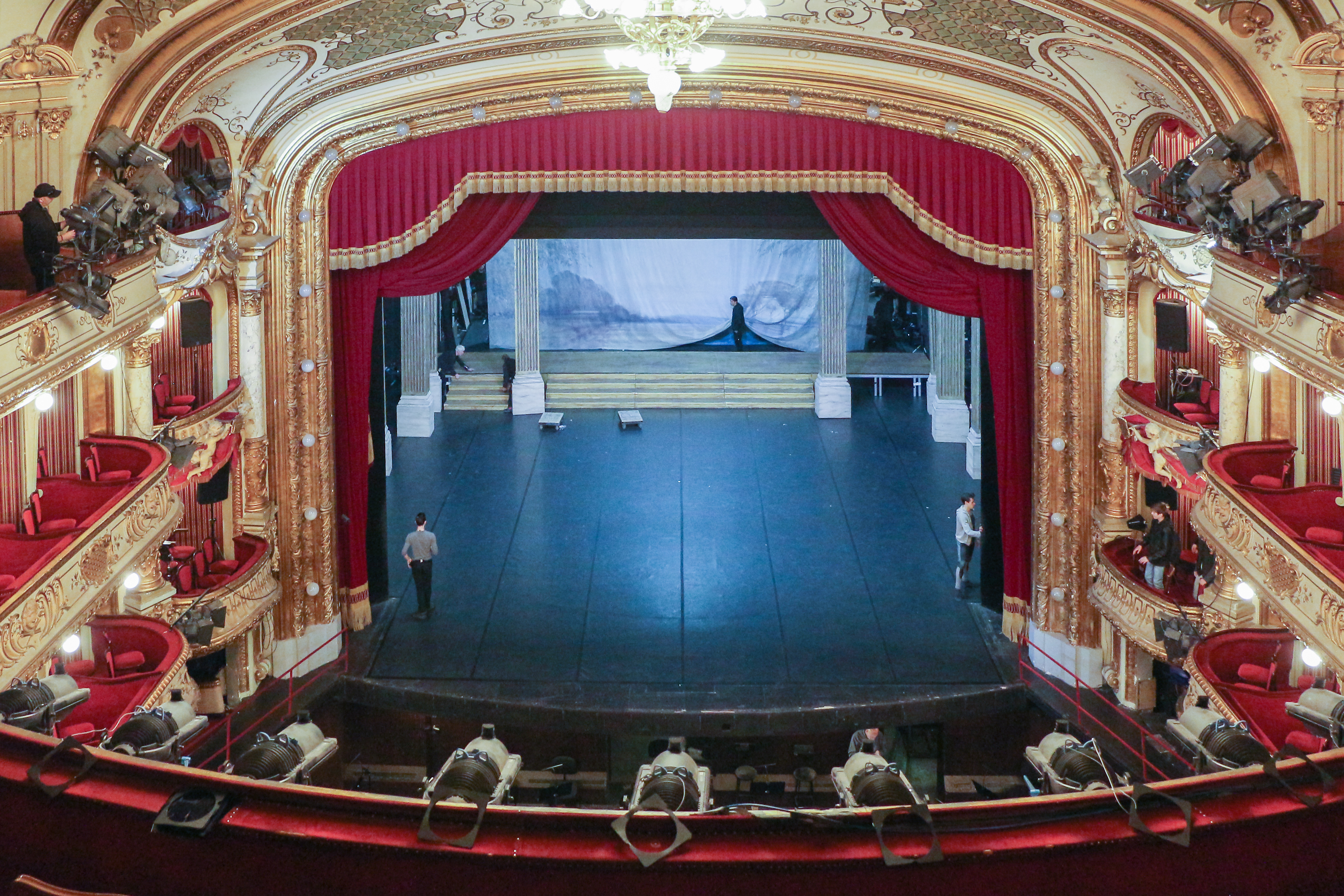
Interior and stage

The theatre maintained the continuity of its artistic activity and its multiple repertoire orientation (from patriotic drama in the second half of the 19th century, through interest in world classics and older Croatian drama, to contemporary Croatian drama, which was nurtured by special competitions and the institution of the Demeter Award, 1907–45), despite repeated censorship pressures and bans on certain politically provocative productions attempts to ideologically control and direct it, and even occasional misuse of its space for political propaganda purposes.

During the NDH, the ensemble was divided into the Croatian State Theatre and a part that operated as a partisan traveling troupe. After the end of the war, the ensemble was reunited, expanded and changed, and now operates under the name of the Croatian National Theatre. In 1950s, after breaking with the Stalinist cultural model, the repertoire and theatrical poetics were modernized, and texts by more contemporary foreign writers gradually appeared on the stage, finding shelter on the Chamber Stage of the Croatian National Theatre, opened in 1957. As the only and then central Croatian and Zagreb theatre institution for a long time, the Croatian National Theatre faced a changed theatrical context with the emergence of other theatres, in which it first lost its primacy over the presentation of contemporary world and Croatian dramatic language and increasingly focused on the classical repertoire, and in the 1990s, special attention was paid to drama with themes from Croatian history.

From 1963, a collaboration with the Music Biennale began on a previously unknown modern and avant-garde repertoire (e.g. Stravinsky, Arnold Schoenberg, etc.), great foreign singers and foreign opera ensembles (from Hamburg, Berlin, London) were guests, and the Croatian National Theatre Opera toured Great Britain, Czechoslovakia, France, Germany, Italy, the Netherlands, Japan and Austria.

== Performances ==
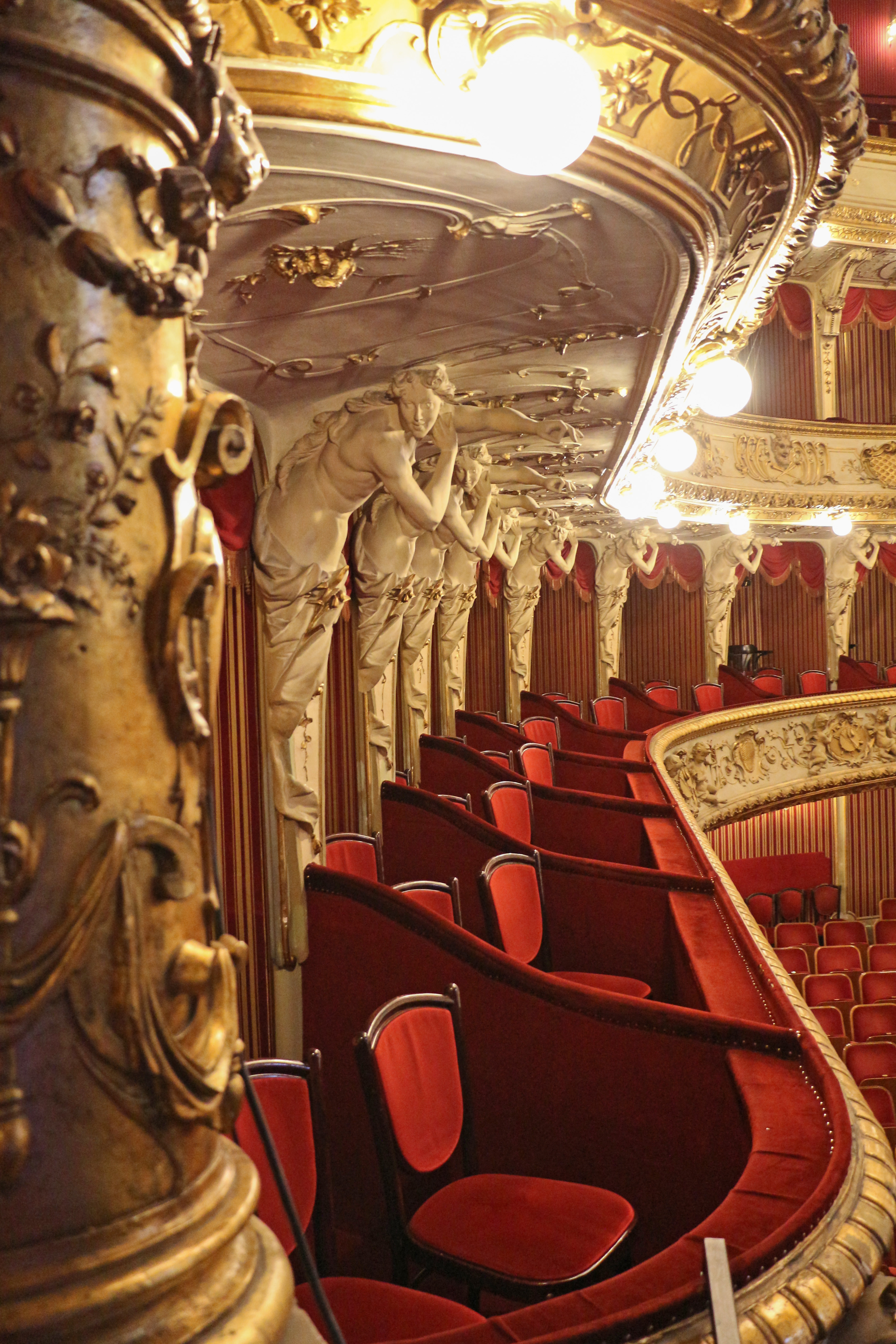
Interior of the theatre

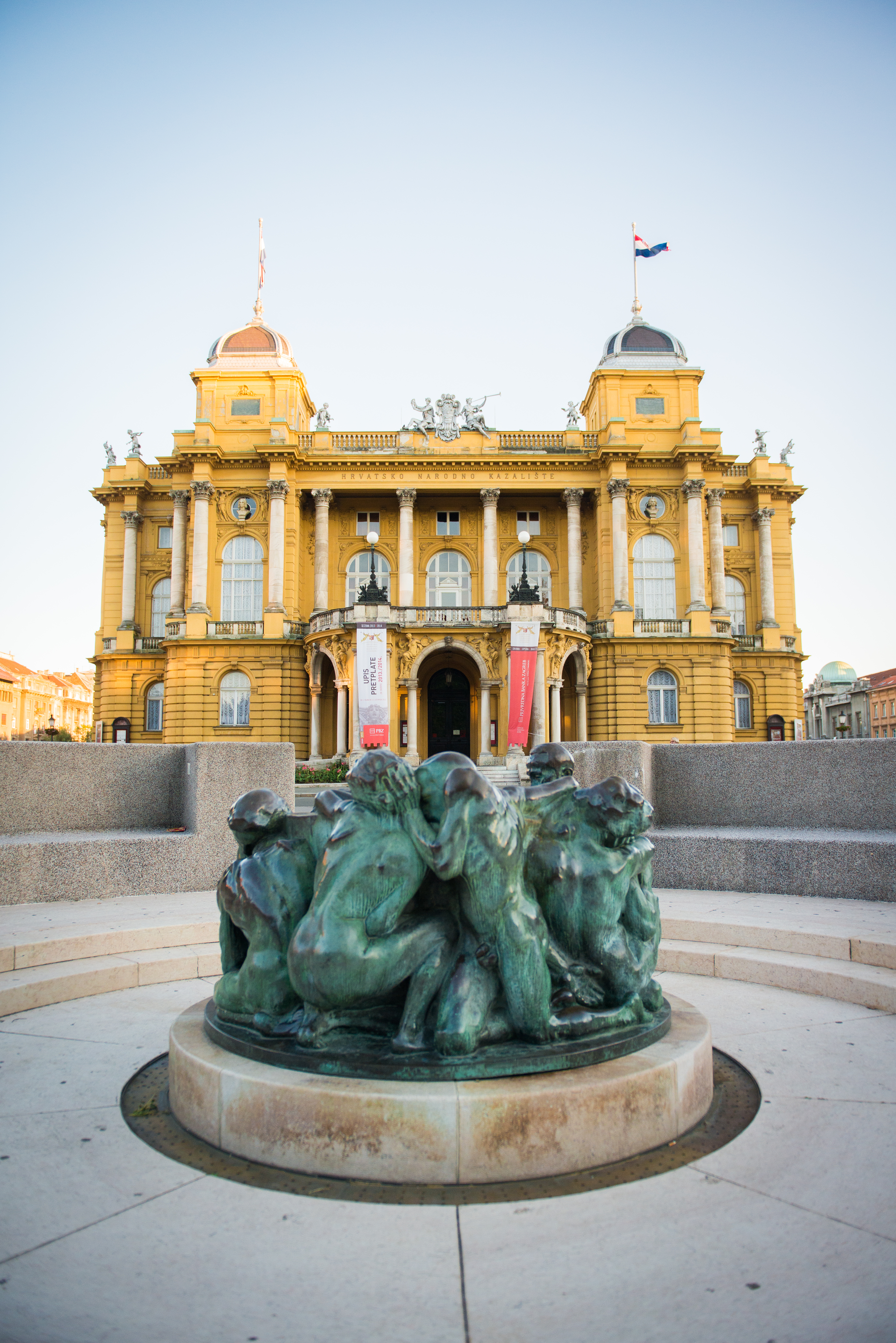
Croatian National Theatre and Well of Life statue, made by Ivan Meštrović

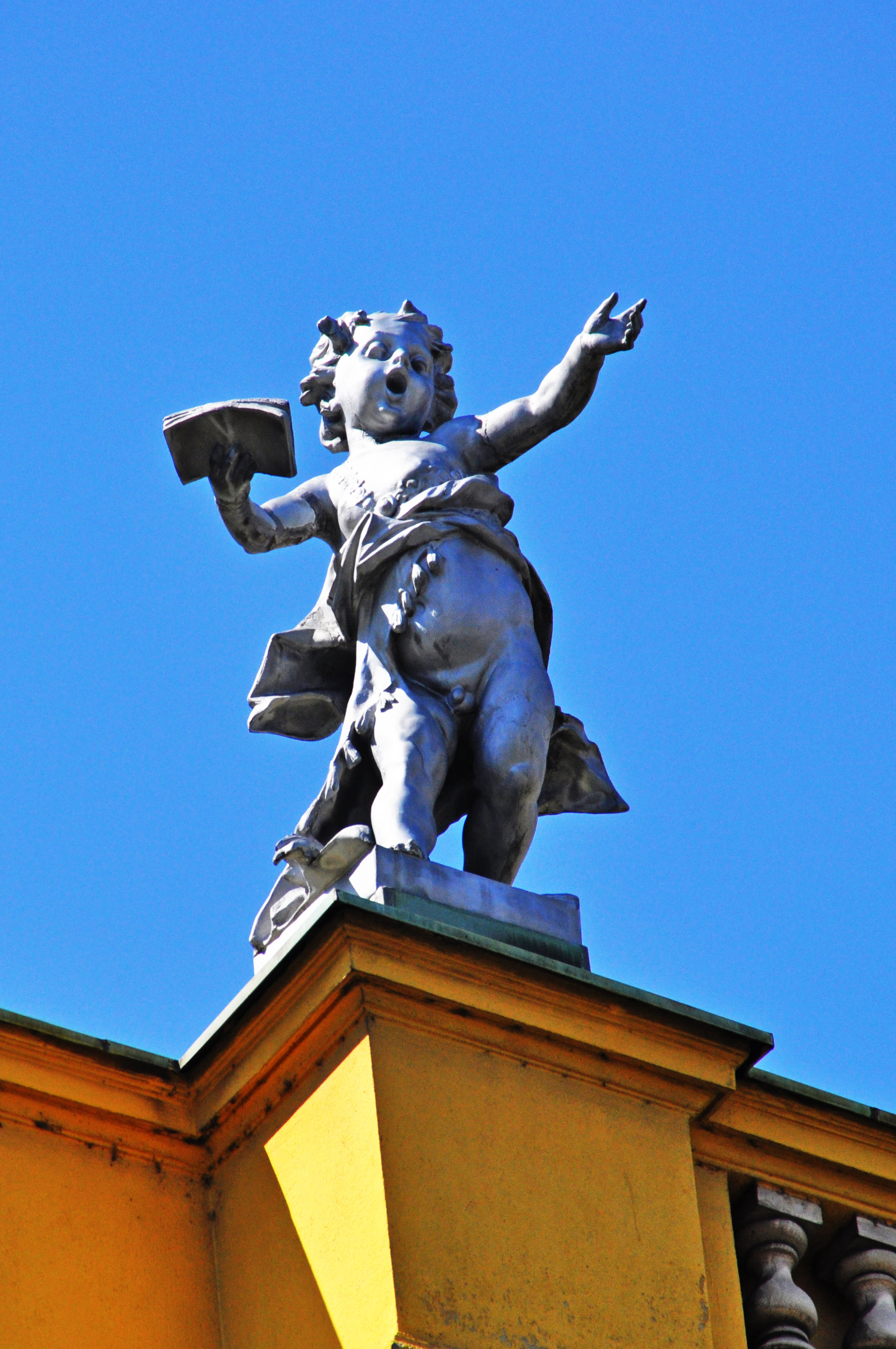
Putto statue on the theatre

During its 150 years of operation, the theater has performed 2,900 dramas, more than 900 operas and operettas, and 300 ballet premieres. Many of Croatia's leading artists have worked at the theatre. Its first manager and dramatist was the Greek–Croatian poet Dimitrija Demeter, a leading activist of the Croatian national revival movement, with Ivan Zajc as first conductor. Jakov Gotovac was the theatre's opera conductor from 1923 to 1958. The famous Croatian theatre director Branko Gavella began his career here, as did the first Croatian prima ballerina Mia Čorak Slavenska. A notable comic opera, Ero s onoga svijeta, premiered in this theatre in 1935. Until the closure of the Croatian National Theatre building for renovation (1967–69), many new domestic operas were premiered (e.g. by Gotovac, I. Brkanović, N. Devčić, etc.) and new foreign operas were performed. The theatre has also seen many international artists including Franz Liszt, Sarah Bernhardt, Franz Lehár, Richard Strauss, Gérard Philipe, Vivien Leigh, Laurence Olivier, Jean-Louis Barrault, Peter Brook, Mario Del Monaco, José Carreras.

Most notable performances held in the theatre:

=== Opera ===
- Vincenzo Bellini; Norma
- Georges Bizet & Roland Petit; Carmen
- Giuseppe Verdi; Aida
- Giuseppe Verdi; Nabucco
- Jules Massenet; Werther
- Ivan Zajc; Nikola Šubić Zrinjski
- Jakov Gotovac; Ero s onoga svijeta
- Giacomo Puccini; La Bohème
- Johann Strauss; Die Fledermaus
- Marko Marulić; Judita
- Giacomo Puccini; La bohème

=== Theatre ===
- Antonín Dvořák; Rusalka
- Lucy Kirkwood; Firmament
- Fyodor Dostoevsky; Crime and Punishment
- Miroslav Krleža; Messrs. Glembay
- Miroslav Krleža; Zastave
- Richard Wagner; Tannhäuser
- Friedrich Schiller; Maria Stuart
- Oscar Wilde; An Ideal Husband
- Carlo Goldoni; Le baruffe chiozzotte
- William Shakespeare; Measure for Measure
- Rene Medvešek; One Song a Day Takes Mischief Away

=== Ballet ===
- Pyotr Ilyich Tchaikovsky; The Nutcracker
- Pyotr Ilyich Tchaikovsky; Swan Lake
- Pyotr Ilyich Tchaikovsky; The Sleeping Beauty
- William Shakespeare; Othello
- William Shakespeare; Hamlet
- Adolphe Adam; Giselle
- Henrik Ibsen, Edvard Grieg & Edward Clug; Peer Gynt

== Theatre today ==
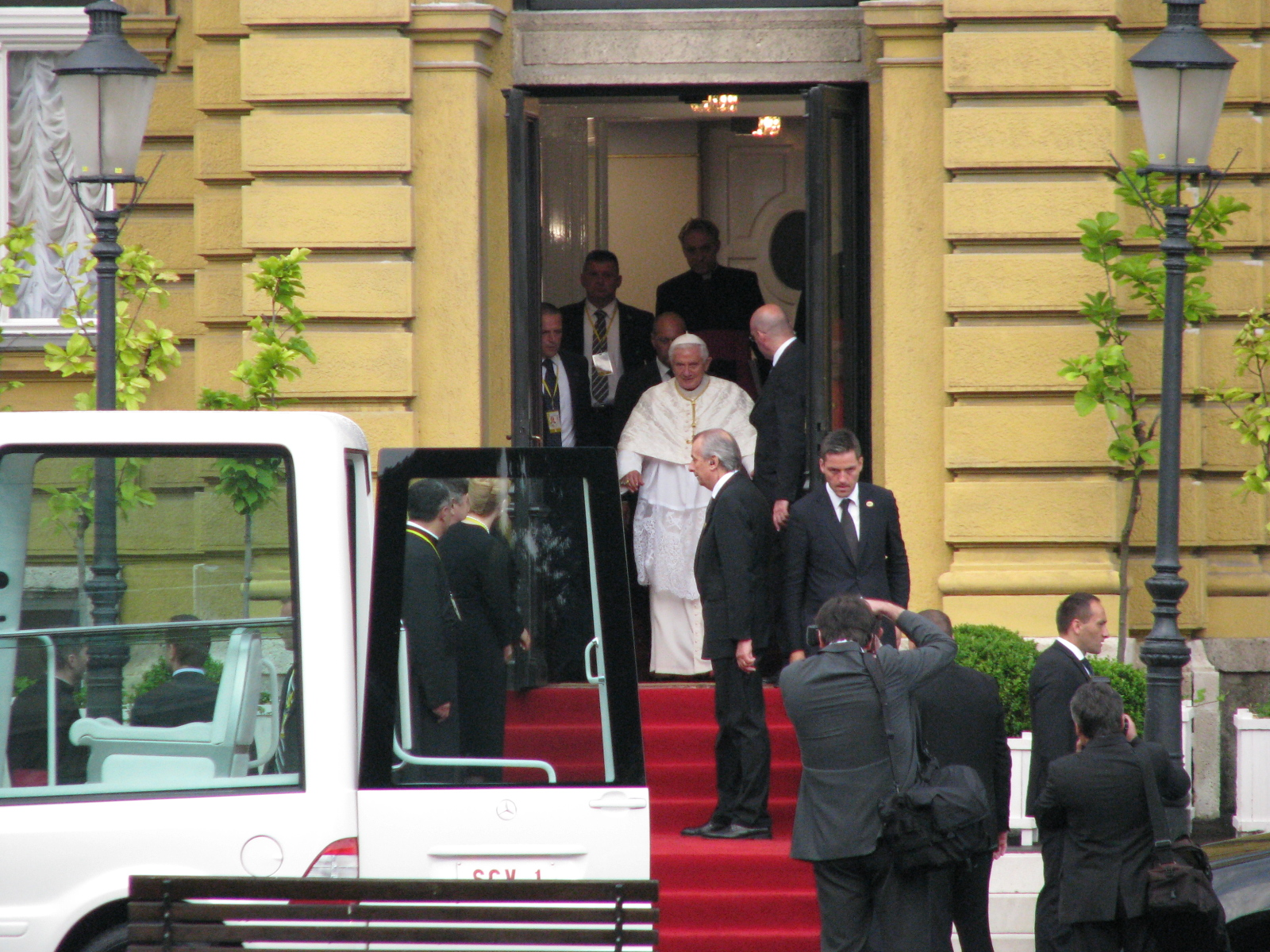
Pope Benedict XVI visiting the Theatre in 2011

Croatian National Theatre in Zagreb is considered to be the most important theatre institution in Croatia. There are also Croatian National Theatres in Split, Rijeka, Osijek, Varaždin, Zadar, Šibenik, Pula and Mostar in Bosnia and Herzegovina. Celebrations marking the 100th anniversary of the building were held on 14 October 1995.

Pope Benedict XVI visited the Theatre during his visit to Zagreb on 4 and 5 June 2011.

The Theatre was used as a filming location for the 2013 biographical drama film Diana, directed by Oliver Hirschbiegel and starring Naomi Watts as Princess Diana. In the film, the building stood in for the Royal Opera House in London.

In collaboration with the website 24sata, due to the COVID-19 pandemic, the Croatian National Theater in Zagreb decided to allow citizens access quality cultural content through a YouTube channel, which featured daily performances from the branches of opera, ballet, and drama.

== Gallery ==
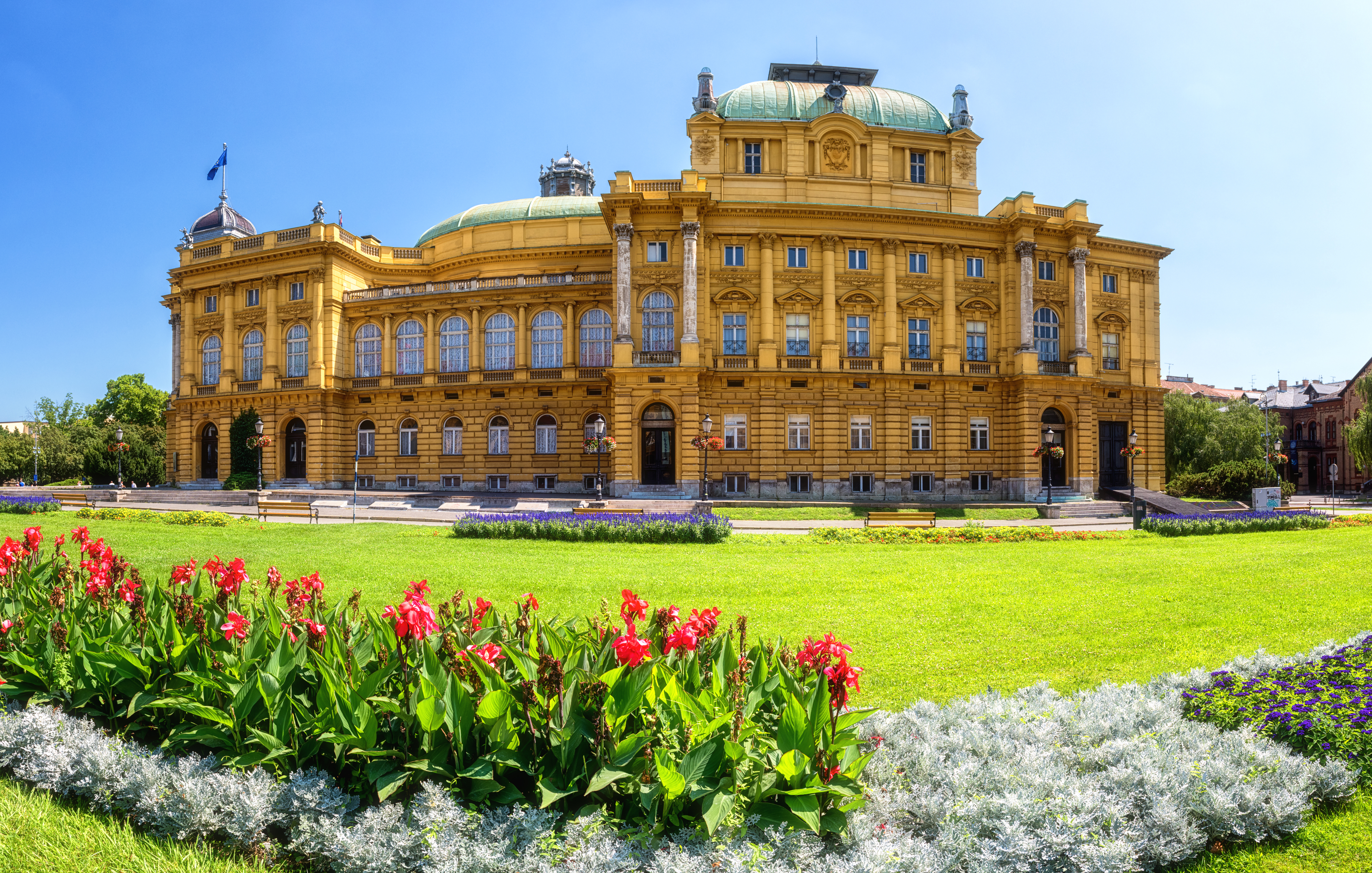
West view of the theater

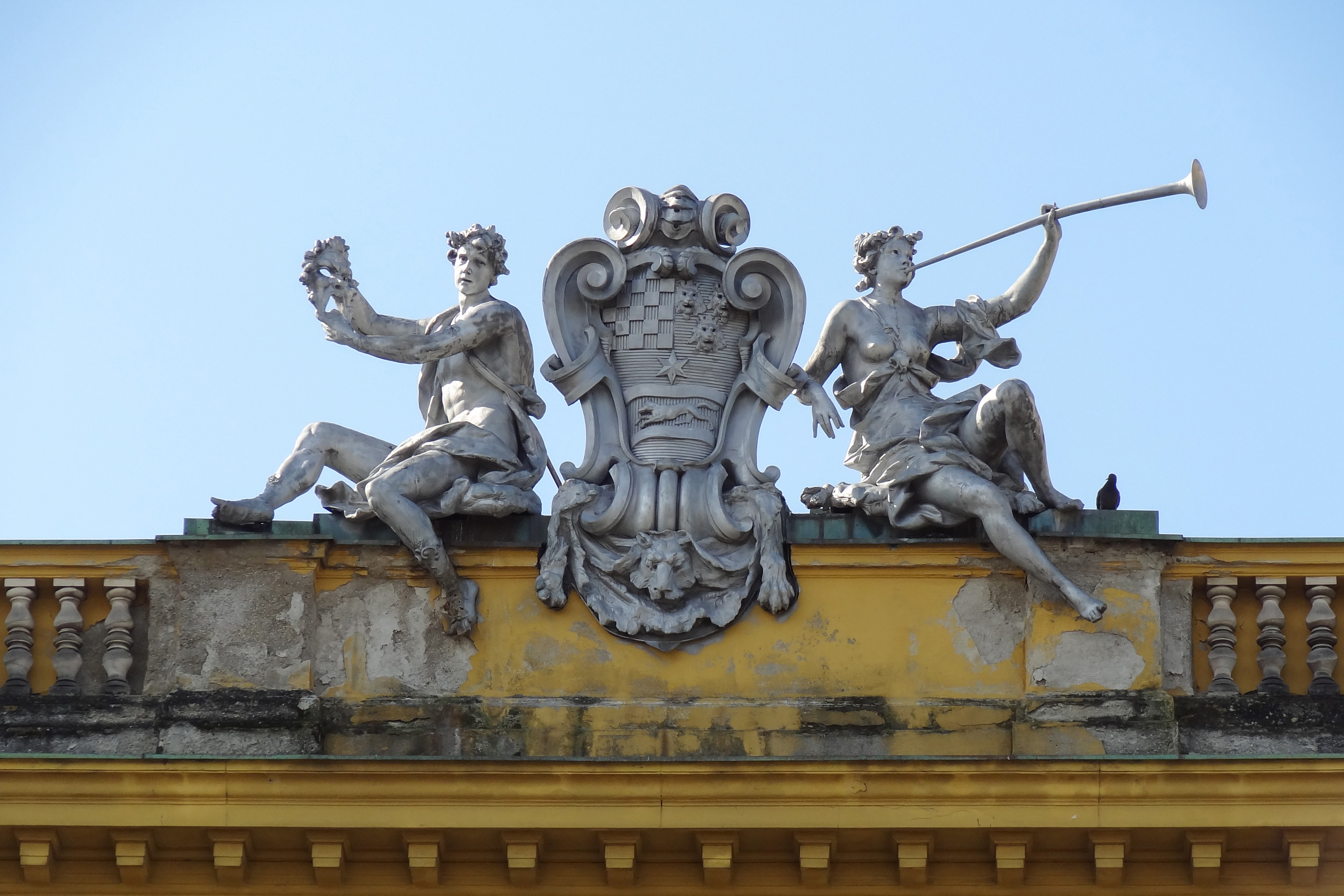
Statues at the top of the building

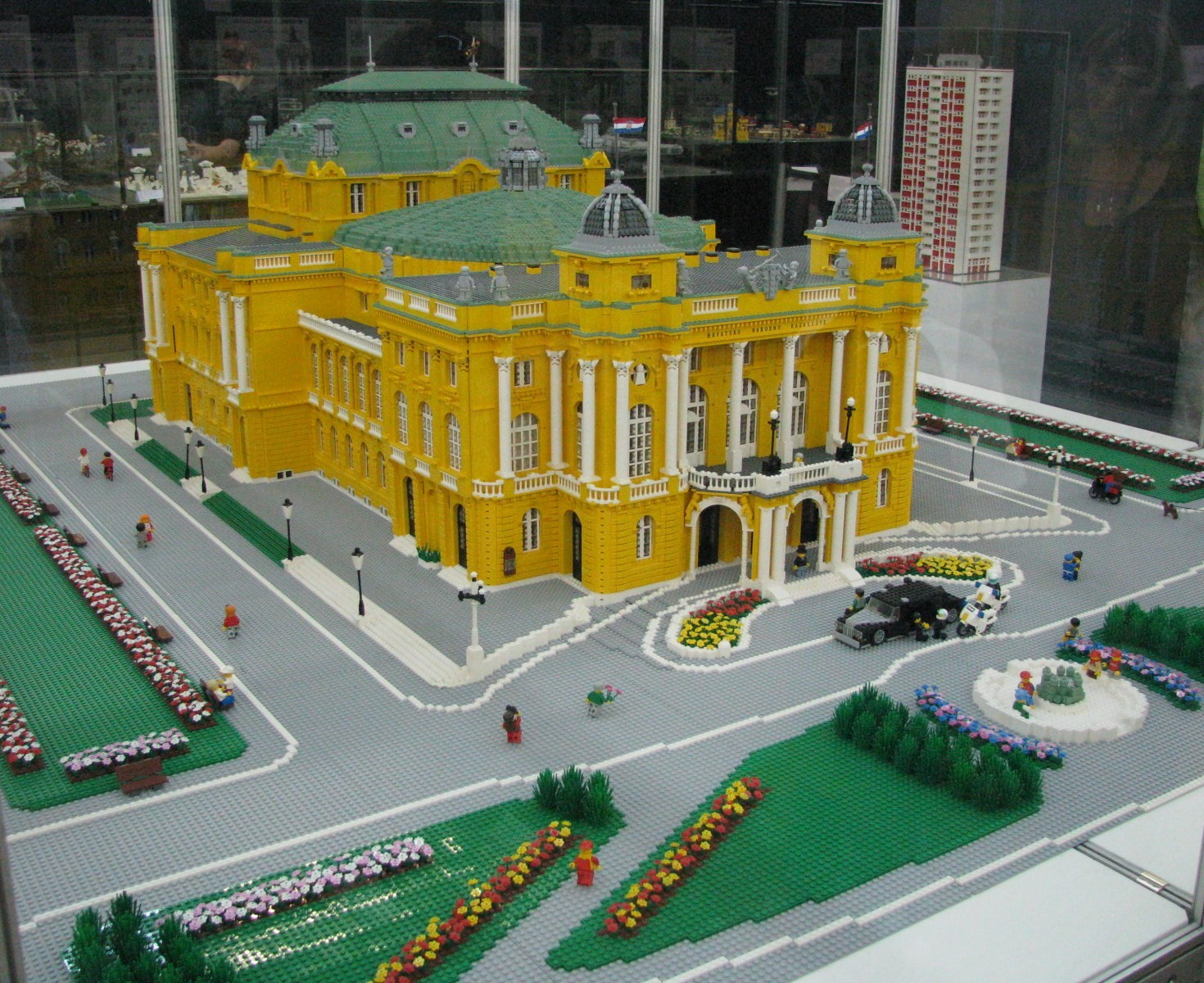
A Lego model of the theater

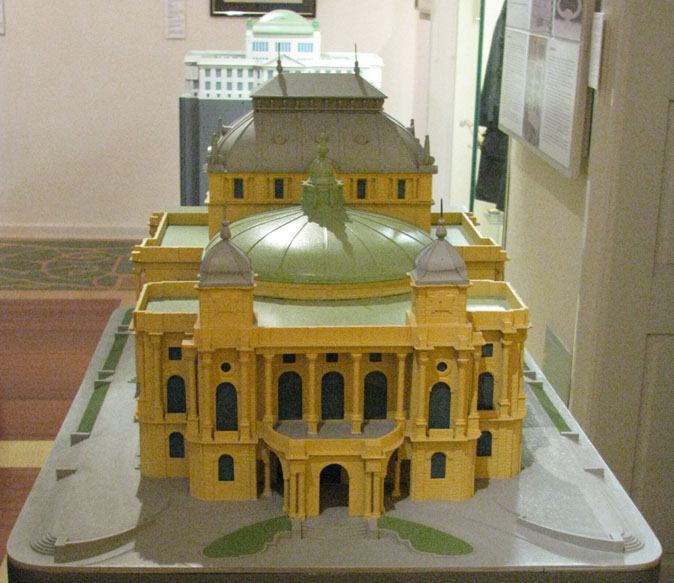
Model of the theatre in Zagreb City Museum

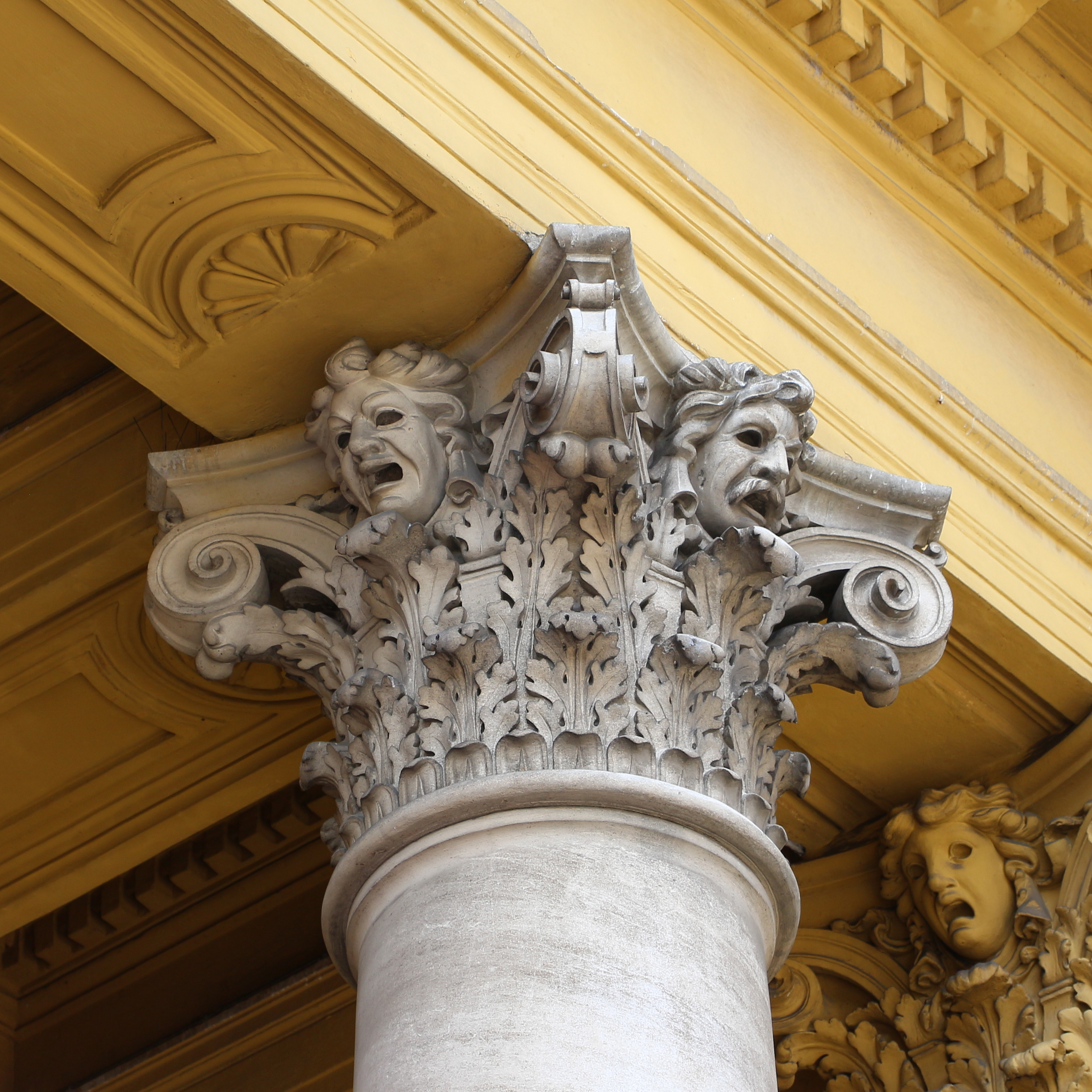
Details of a column in Corinthian order

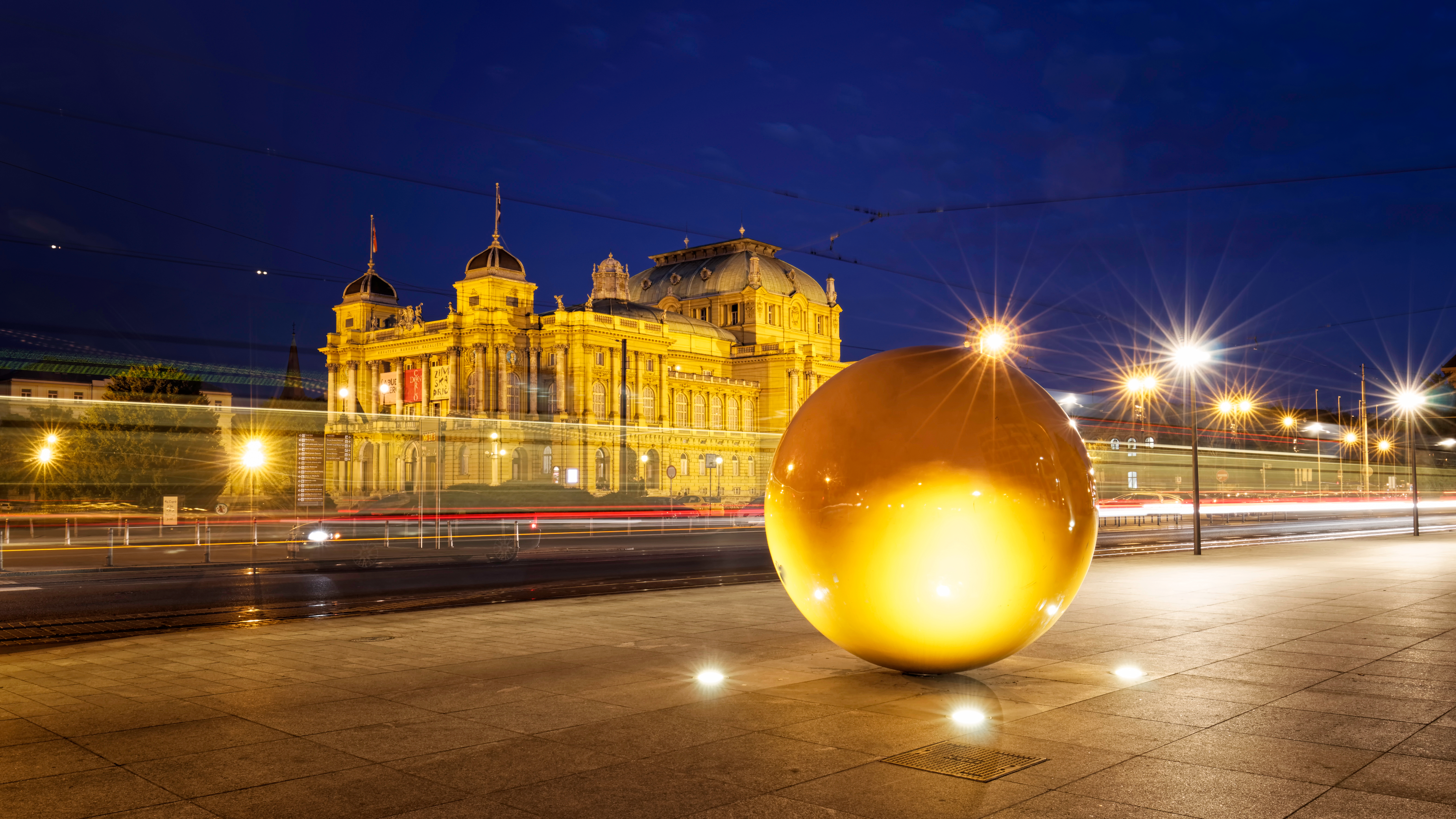
The theater at night

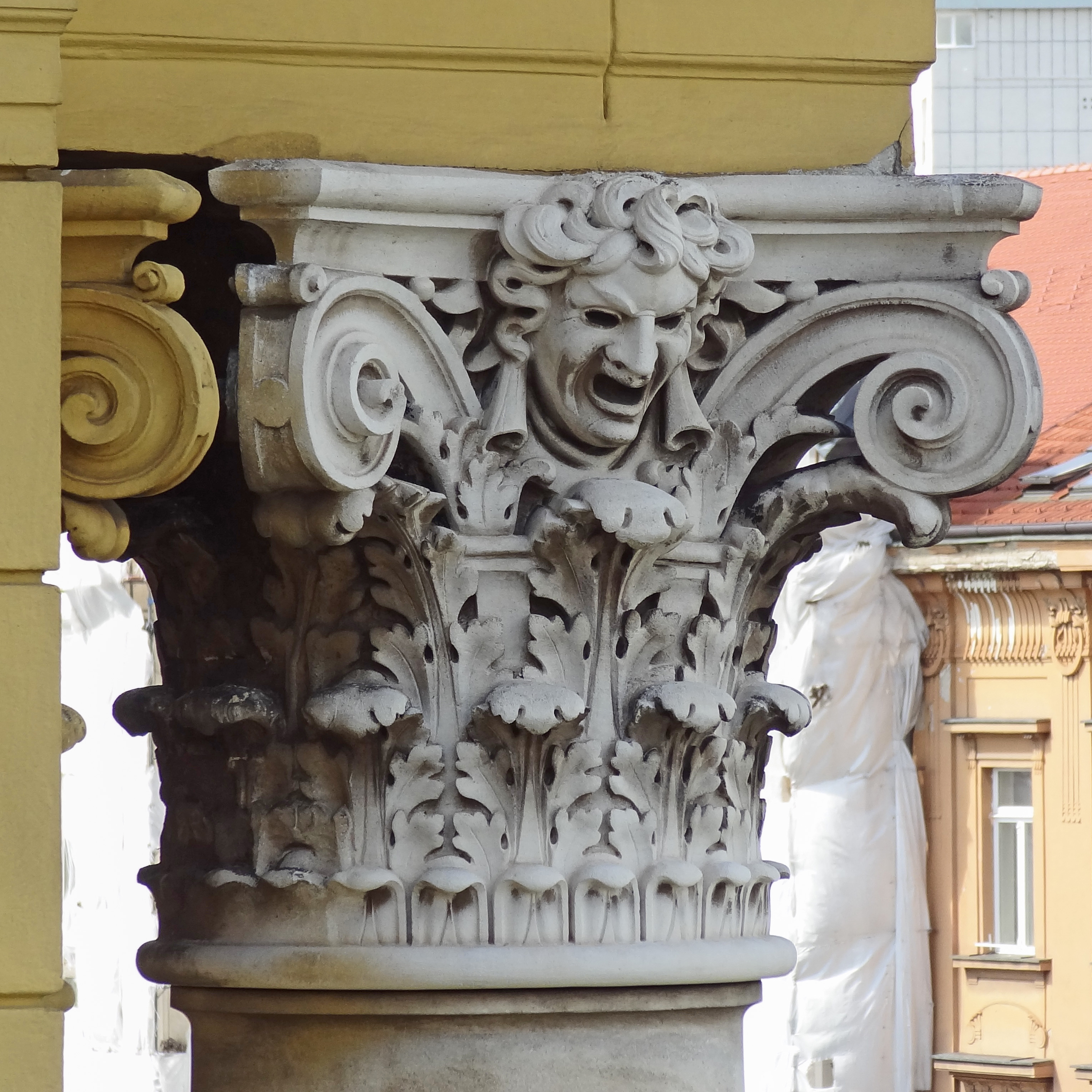
Column detail

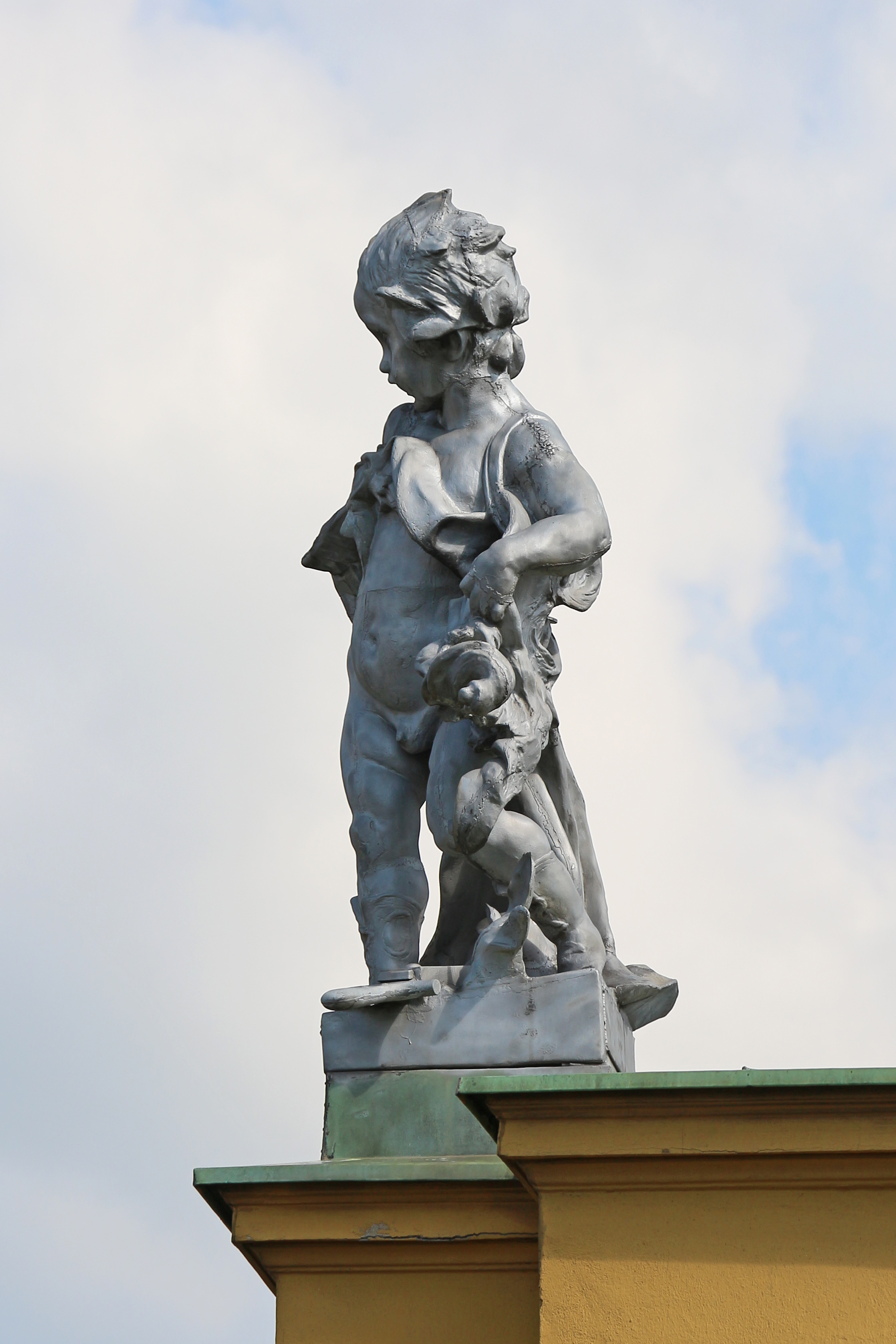
Cupid statue

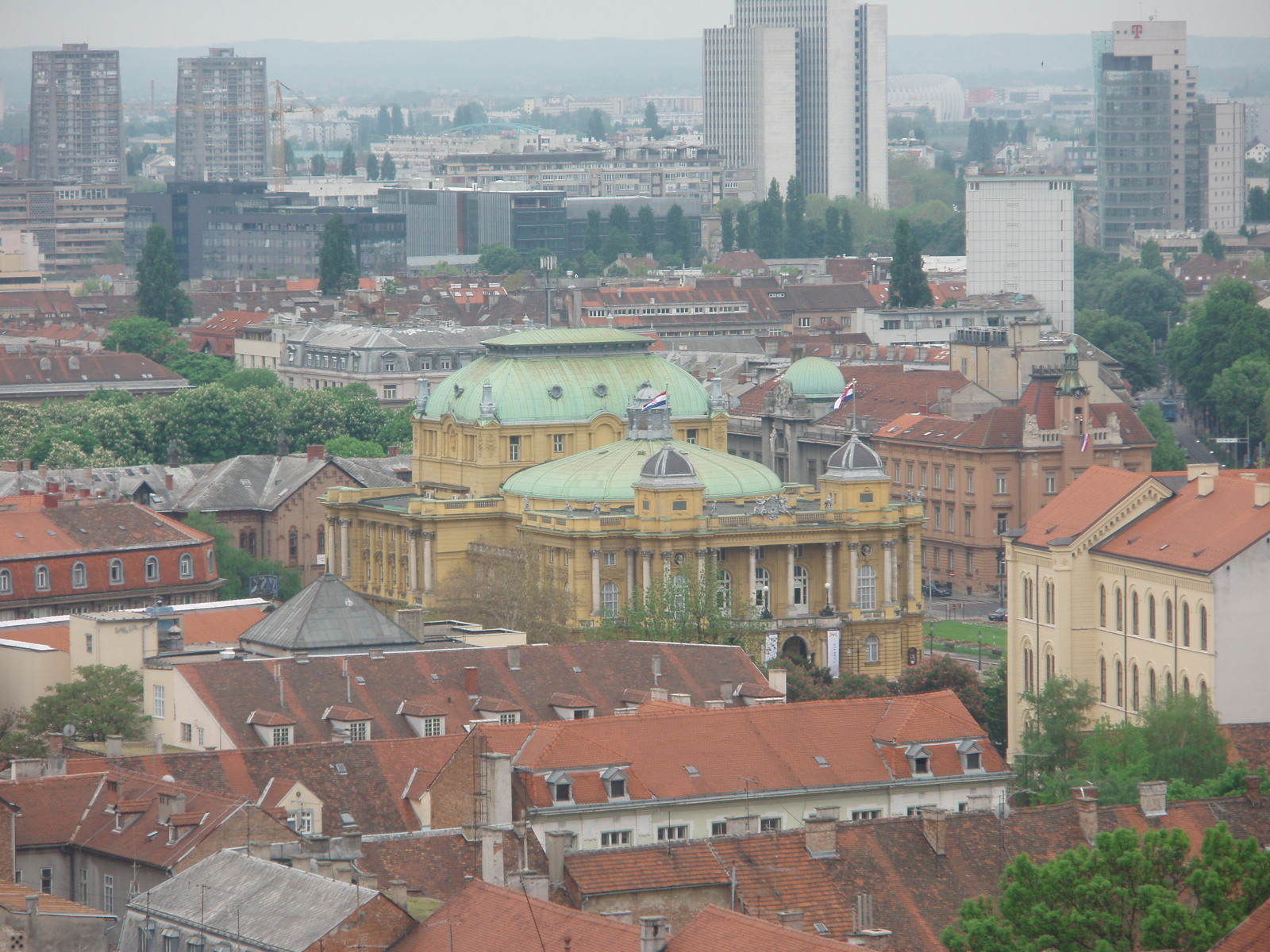
HNK from Upper Town

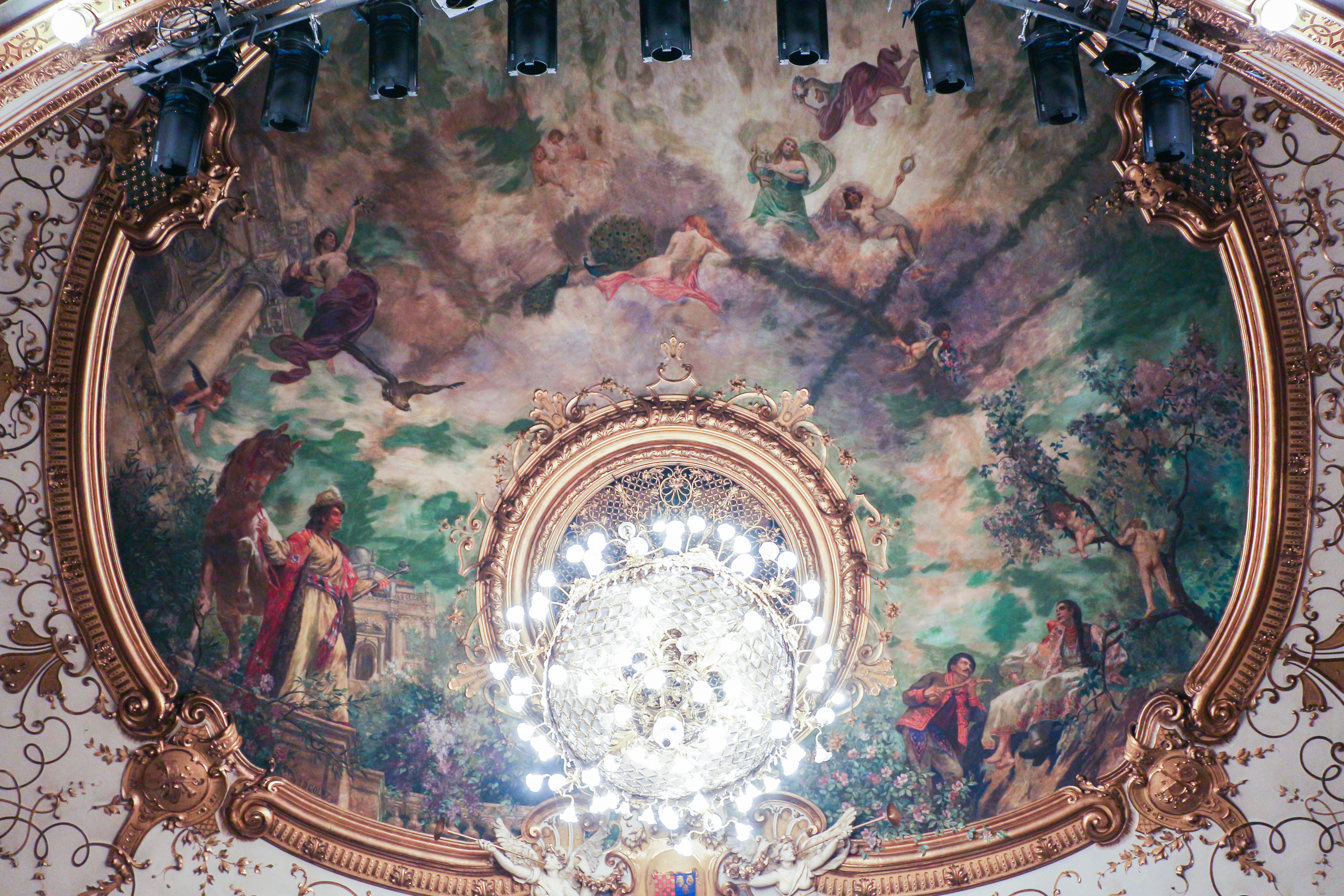
Details of the ceiling

== See also ==
- History of Zagreb
- History of Croatia
- Croatian Academy of Sciences and Arts
