= Musical nationalism =

Use of musical ideas that are identified with a specific country

Musical nationalism refers to the use of musical ideas or motifs that are identified with a specific country, region, or ethnicity, such as folk tunes and melodies, rhythms, and harmonies inspired by them.

== History ==
As a musical movement, nationalism emerged early in the 19th century in connection with political independence movements, and was characterized by an emphasis on national musical elements such as the use of folk songs, folk dances or rhythms, or on the adoption of nationalist subjects for operas, symphonic poems, or other forms of music. As new nations were formed in Europe, nationalism in music was a reaction against the dominance of the mainstream European classical tradition as composers started to separate themselves from the standards set by Italian, French, and especially German traditionalists.

More precise considerations of the point of origin are a matter of some dispute. One view holds that it began with the war of liberation against Napoleon, leading to a receptive atmosphere in Germany for Weber's opera Der Freischütz (1821) and, later, Richard Wagner's epic dramas based on Teutonic legends. At around the same time, Poland's struggle for freedom from the three partitioning powers produced a nationalist spirit in the piano works and orchestral compositions such as Chopin's Fantasy on Polish Airs or Revolutionary Etude; slightly later Italy's aspiration to independence from Austria resonated in many of the operas of Giuseppe Verdi. Countries or regions most commonly linked to musical nationalism include Russia, Czech Republic, Poland, Romania, Hungary, Scandinavia, Spain, the United Kingdom, Latin America and the United States.

== Ethnomusicological perspective ==
Ethnomusicological inquiries frequently involve a focus on the relationship between music and nationalist movements across the world, necessarily following the emergence of the modern nation-state as a consequence of globalization and its associated ideals, in contrast to a pre-imperialist world.

Modern studies of instances of music used in nationalist movements include Thomas Turino's research of Zimbabwe's independence movement of the 1970s and 80s. ZANU nationalists and their ZANLA guerrillas used political songs as a means for engaging a wider variety of socioeconomic classes; traditional Shona cultural practices, including music, were cited as areas of common ground. Revolutionary leader Robert Mugabe formed the Youth League, which regularly organized and performed tribal dances as part of party meetings. The Youth League utilized pre-colonial African tribal music through association with the independence movement to ignite popular desire for a return to pre-colonial African rule. However, Turino also explains that "cosmopolitan" musical styles as well as traditional music intersect to ultimately define national Zimbabwean music.

Other research has focused on recording and broadcasting technology as conducive to the dissemination of nationalist ideals. In early twentieth-century Afghanistan, music played on Afghan radio blended Hindustani, Persian, Pashtun, and Tadjik traditions into a single national style, blurring ethnic lines at the behest of nationalist "ideologues." Around the same time, the nationalist Turkish state failed in its attempt to make Turkey a "Western" nation by broadcasting European classical music to rural areas when these areas instead simply tuned in to Egyptian radio.

== Modern perspectives and critiques ==
According to some authors, musical nationalism involves the appropriation of music necessarily originating from distinct ethnic, cultural, and class hierarchies for the express purpose of furthering the political goals of nationalist movements. Postmodernist critiques of musical nationalism regard ethnicity in terms of opposition and relativities, especially as it relates to the dominant culture. As ethnomusicology moves in step with anthropology and other disciplines' trends to "decolonize" their respective fields, recent research surrounding the role of music in nationalist movements tends to surface in ethnomusicologists' now essential tradition of long-term field research. Katherine Hagedorn's account of post-revolutionary Cuban national music, compiled after repeated stays in the country in the 1990s, concludes that the government's designation of Afro-Cuban music and dance traditions as folklore and dramatized national theater performances of the tradition for the sake of theatrics is harmful to the tradition's religious legitimacy.

== Identity and authenticity ==
Numerous analysis inside and outside the ethnomusicological discipline finds that music contributes significantly to perceptions of national identity. Peter Wade argues that the amorphous, fluid nature of music allows for similar music to constitute aspects of differing and even contrasting identities. As an example, Wade points to Colombia's specific nationalist music identity originating from its position on the Caribbean Sea. As modes of globalization penetrated the country, Colombians began to consume increasingly diverse types of music, which set the stage for Carlos Vives's 1993 album featuring modernized versions of vallenato songs from the 1930s from the Caribbean coastal region. World beat can be considered contrary to nationalism, designed to appeal to a more global audience by mixing styles of disparate cultures. This may compromise cultural authenticity while commodifying cultural tradition. (see Ethnomusicology#Globalization)

== Belgium ==
Henri Vieuxtemps
Henri Vieuxtemps (1820–1881) was a Franco-Belgian composer and violinist.
Guillaume Lekeu
Guillaume Lekeu (1870–1894) was a Belgian composer who studied with Cesar Franck and Vincent d'Indy.

== Brazil ==
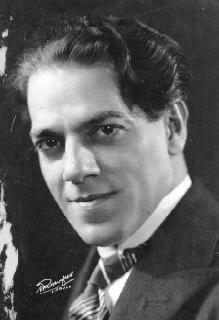
Heitor Villa-Lobos

Carlos Gomes
The most representative composer of Brazilian romanticism, Carlos Gomes (1836–1896) used several references from the country's folk music and traditional themes, chiefly in his opera Il Guarany (1870).
Chiquinha Gonzaga
Chiquinha Gonzaga (1847–1935) was a Brazilian composer, pianist, and the first woman conductor in Brazil. She was the first pianist of choro.
Heitor Villa-Lobos
Heitor Villa-Lobos (1887–1959) traveled extensively throughout Brazil in his youth and recorded folksongs and tunes that he later used in his series Bachianas Brasileiras and all of his Chôros (amongst them, his Chôros No. 10, subtitled Rasga o coração after the song with words by Catulo da Paixão Cearense and music by Anacleto de Madeiros, which Villa-Lobos quotes in the second half of this choral-orchestral piece, which employs native percussion).
Francisco Mignone
Francisco Mignone (1897–1986) incorporated folk rhythms and instruments into his suites Fantasias Brasileiras nos.1–4 (1929–1936), his 12 Brazilian Waltzes (1968–1979), Congada (1921) and Babaloxá (1936), besides composing ballets based on major literary works from Brazilian literature.

== Bulgaria ==
Pancho Vladigerov
Pancho Vladigerov (1899-1978) was a Bulgarian composer who successfully combined Bulgarian folk music and classical music. He was also a respected pedagogue to next-generation Bulgarian composers.

== Canada ==
Joseph Quesnel
Joseph Quesnel (1746–1809) was a French Canadian composer. He wrote two operas, Colas et Colinette and Lucas et Cécile, the first of their kind in North America.

== Croatia ==
Vatroslav Lisinski
Vatroslav Lisinski (1819–1854) was a composer famous for his two Croatian operas, Love and Malice and Porin.
Ivan Zajc
Ivan Zajc (1832–1914) dominated Croatia's musical scene for over four decades, composing many patriotic operas such as Nikola Šubić Zrinski.

== Czech Republic ==
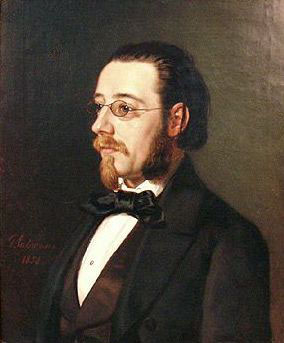
Bedřich Smetana

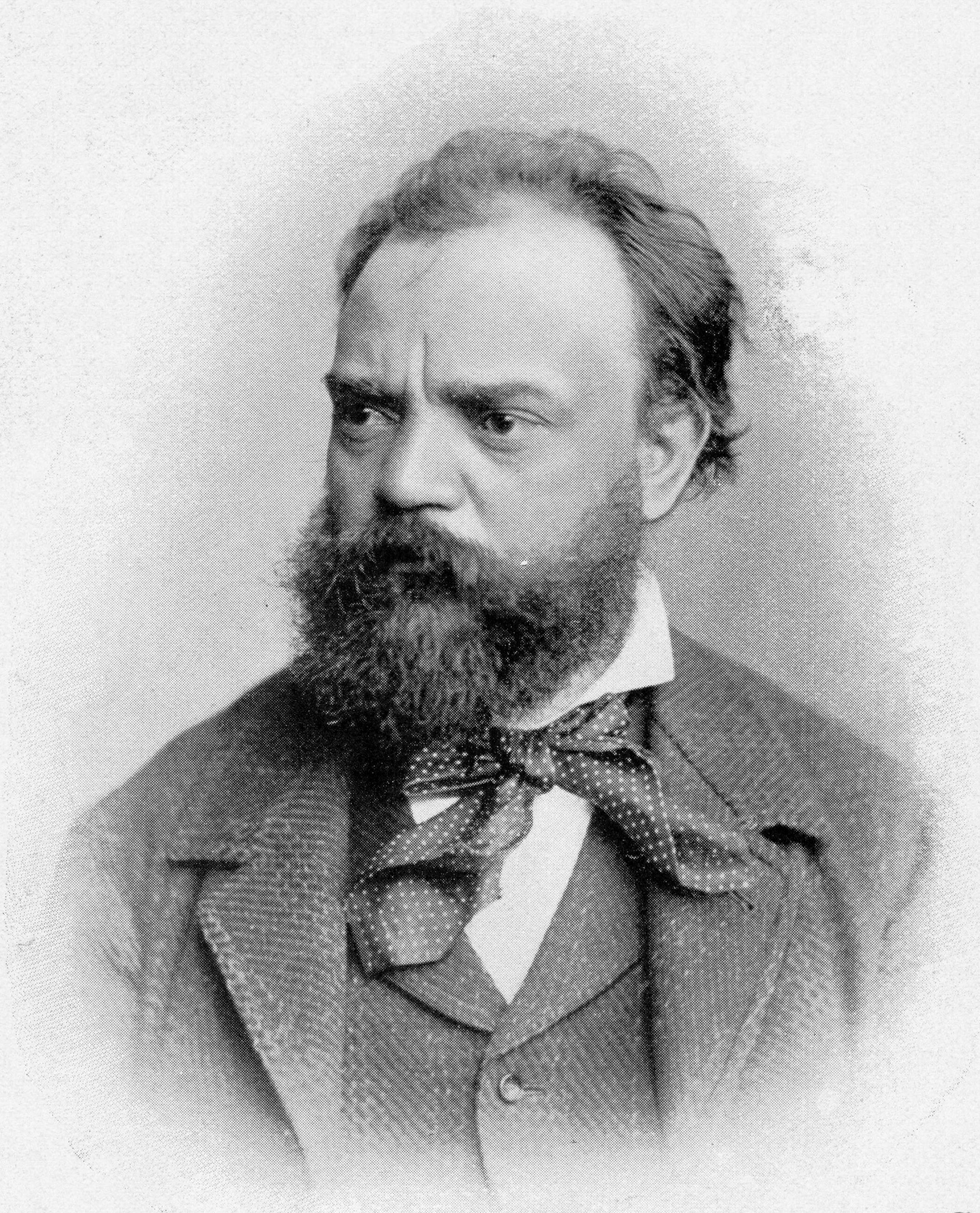
Antonín Dvořák

Bedřich Smetana
Bedřich Smetana (1824–1884) pioneered the development of a musical style that became closely identified with his country's aspirations to independent statehood. He is widely regarded in his homeland as the father of Czech music. He is best known for the symphonic cycle Má vlast ("My Homeland"), which portrays the history, legends, and landscape of his native land, and for his opera The Bartered Bride.
Antonín Dvořák
After Smetana, Antonín Dvořák (1841–1904) was the second Czech composer to achieve worldwide recognition. Following Smetana's nationalist example, Dvořák frequently employed aspects, specifically rhythms, of the folk music of Moravia and his native Bohemia. Dvořák's own style creates a national idiom by blending elements of the classical symphonic tradition and extraneous popular musical traditions, absorbing folk influences and finding effective ways of using them. Dvořák also wrote nine operas, which, other than his first, have librettos in Czech and were intended to convey Czech national spirit, as were some of his choral works.
Leoš Janáček
Leoš Janáček (1854–1928) was a Czech composer, musical theorist, folklorist, publicist and teacher, best known for his operas and his Sinfonietta.
Bohuslav Martinů
Bohuslav Martinů (1890–1959) is compared with Prokofiev and Bartók in his innovative incorporation of Central European ethnomusicology into his music. He continued to use Bohemian and Moravian folk melodies throughout his oeuvre, usually nursery rhymes—for instance in Otvírání studánek ("The Opening of the Wells").

== Denmark ==
Friedrich Kuhlau
Friedrich Kuhlau (1786–1832) was a composer and one of the first exponents of Danish nationalism.
Johan Peter Emilius Hartmann
Johan Peter Emilius Hartmann (1805–1900) was one of the leading Danish composers of the 19th century, a period known as the Danish Golden Age.
Niels Gade
Niels Gade (1817–1890), along with his father-in-law J. P. E. Hartmann, was another leading composer of the Danish Golden Age.
Carl Nielsen
Carl Nielsen (1865–1931) was a Danish composer, conductor and violinist.

== Finland ==
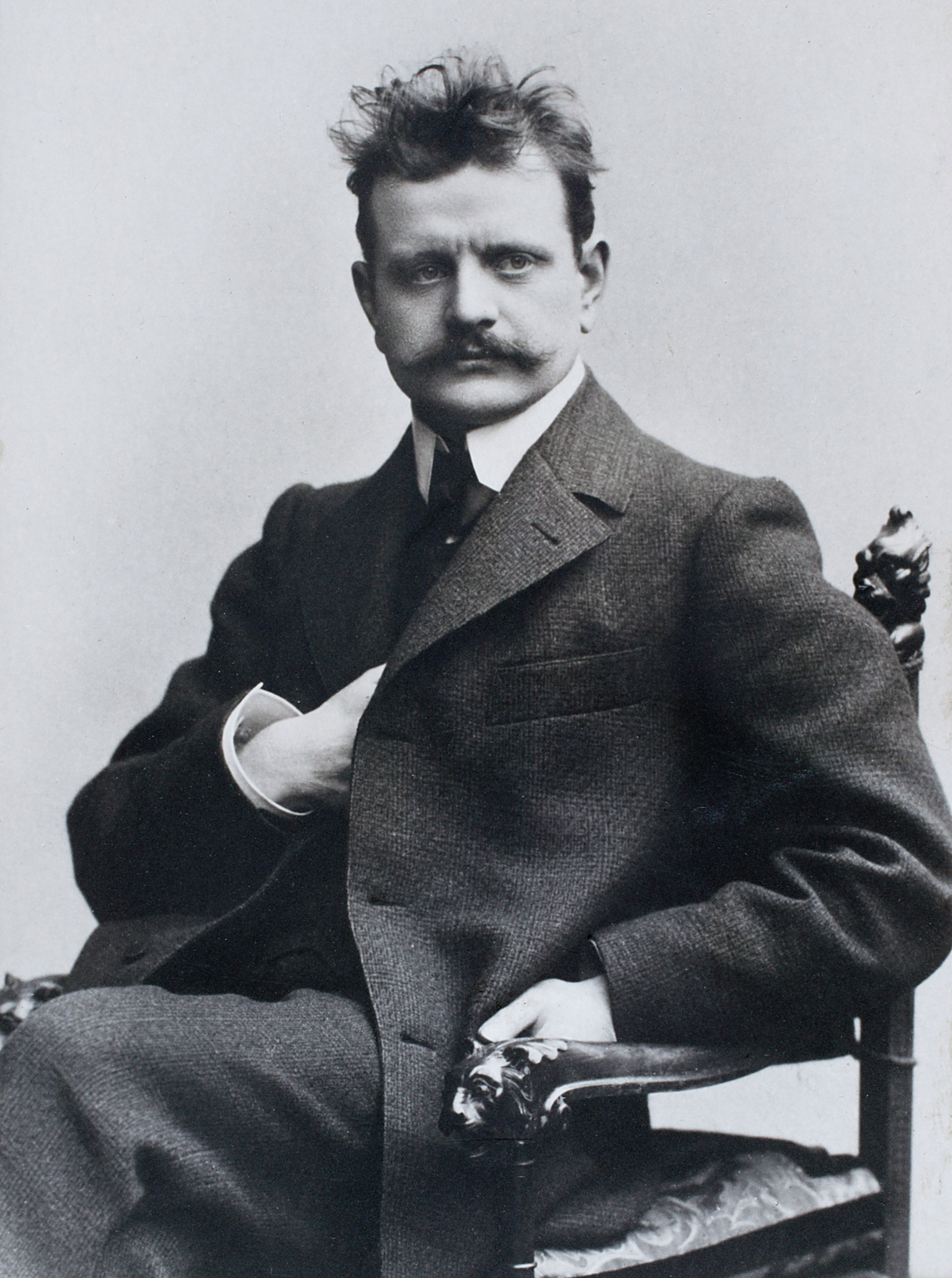
Jean Sibelius

Jean Sibelius
Jean Sibelius (1865–1957) had strong patriotic feelings for Finland. He composed Finlandia and the Karelia Suite, both of which emulate the rough culture and folk music of Finland. Both works also have nationalist programmatic elements; for instance, Finlandia describes the struggle of the Finnish people in the early 20th century.

== France ==
The Société nationale de musique was an important organisation in late 19th/early 20th century France to promote French music. Members included Hector Berlioz, Charles Gounod, Ambroise Thomas, Romain Bussine, Camille Saint-Saëns, Georges Bizet, Léo Delibes, Alexis de Castillon, Théodore Dubois, Henri Duparc, Gabriel Fauré, César Franck, Jules Garcin, Ernest Guiraud, Jules Massenet, and Paul Taffanel. One of its goals was to further the cause of French music in contrast to the Germanic tradition.

== Georgia ==
Zacharia Paliashvili
Zacharia Paliashvili (1871–1933) was one of the founders of Georgian classical music. He is known for his eclectic fusion of Georgian folk songs and 19th-century Romantic themes. He was the founder of the Georgian Philharmonic Society, and the head of the Tbilisi State Conservatoire. Furthermore, Paliashvili's music serves as the basis of the Georgian National Anthem.

== Germany ==
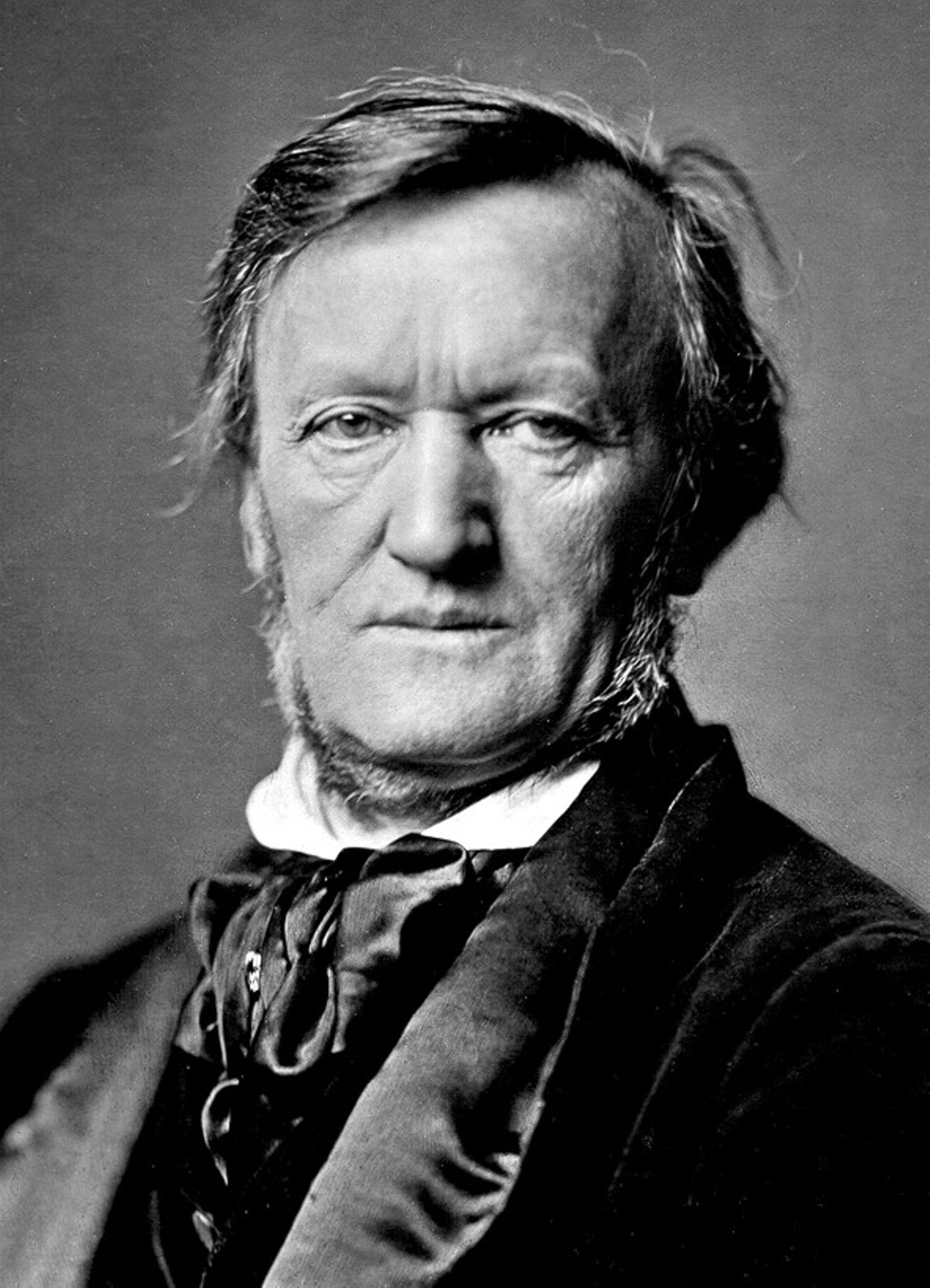
Richard Wagner

Carl Maria von Weber
Carl Maria von Weber (1786–1826) was the composer the first German romantic opera, Der Freischütz. It was seen as a reaction to "years of war and foreign occupation" of the "repressive regimes of the post-Napoleonic German Confederation" that awakened "a sense of the Germans as a nation rooted in a shared language, folklore, history, and geography". However, he also composed an English-language opera, Oberon.
Richard Wagner
Richard Wagner (1813–1883) composed many epic operas that were pro-German. He had been a supporter of the unification of Germany throughout his life. His anti-Semitic views have sometimes been seen as inspiring Adolf Hitler.

== Greece ==
Nikolaos Mantzaros
Nikolaos Mantzaros (1795–1872) was a composer and founder of the Ionian School of music.
Pavlos Carrer
Pavlos Carrer (1829–1896) was a composer and member of the Ionian School.

== Hungary ==
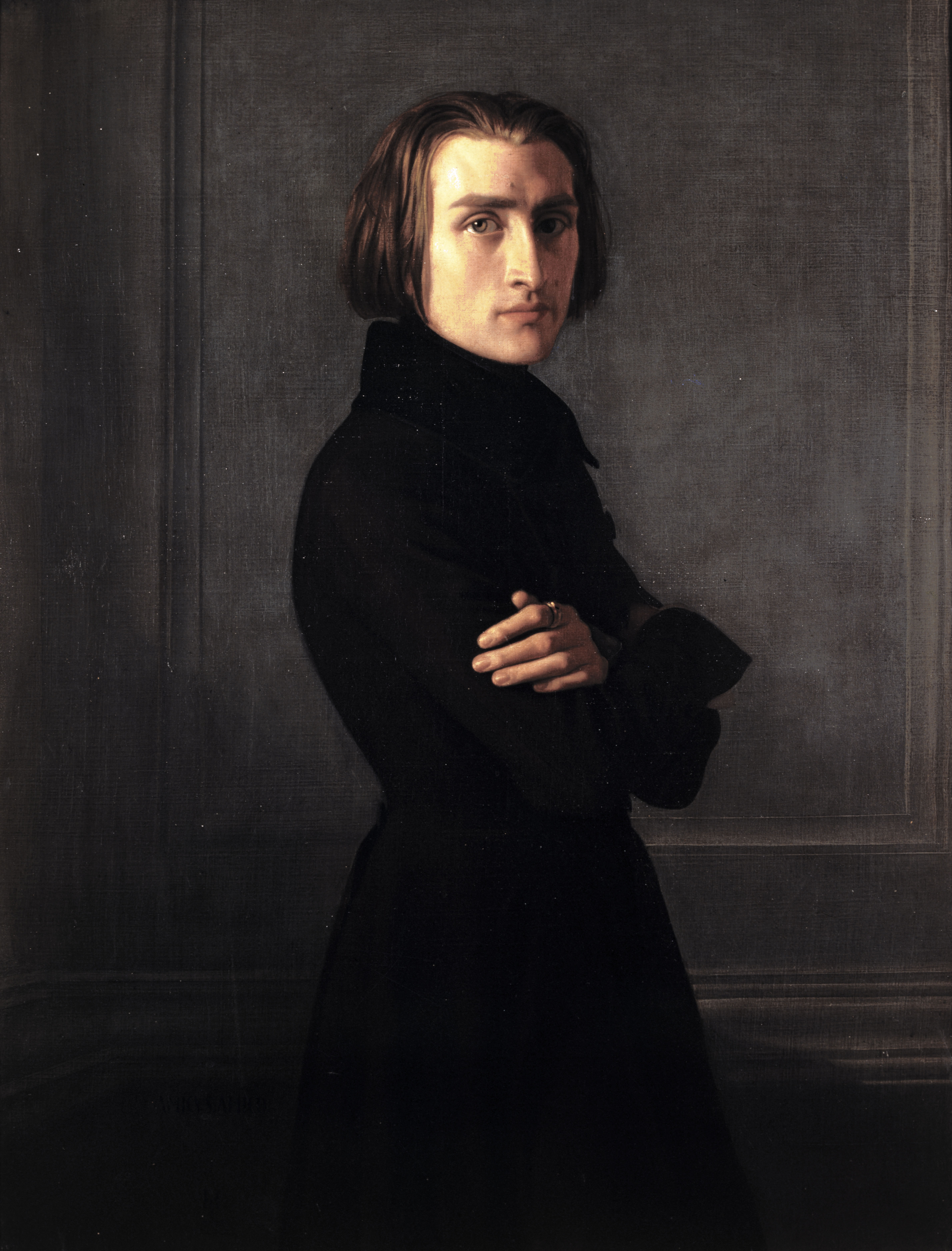
Franz Liszt

Franz Liszt
Franz Liszt (1811–1886) gave successful performances in Vienna, which started his virtuoso career, and was invited back to Hungary to perform in 1839. Verbunkos style had an impact on his music and his Hungarian Rhapsodies contained Hungarian folk music.
Béla Bartók
Béla Bartók (1881–1945) collaborated with fellow Hungarian composer Zoltán Kodály to document Hungarian folk music, which they both incorporated in their musical pieces.
Zoltán Kodály
Zoltán Kodály (1882–1967) studied at the Academy of Music in Hungary and had an interest Hungarian folk songs and would often take prolonged trips to the Hungarian countryside to study the melodies which were then incorporated into his music compositions.

== Italy ==
Giuseppe Verdi
Giuseppe Verdi (1813–1901) instills a sense of nationalism into some of his music. This is evident in Nabucco with the lyrics, "Oh mia Patria sì bella e perduta" (Oh my Fatherland so beautiful and lost). "Viva VERDI" would also be written as a way to support the unification of Italy. This is an acronym for "Viva Vittorio Emanuele Re d'Italia" (Long Live Victor Emmanuel King of Italy) in support of King Victor Emmanuel II.
Amilcare Ponchielli
Amilcare Ponchielli (1834–1886) was an Italian composer, which is the best known of his ballet opera Dance of the Hours, also named "La Gioconda".
Gioachino Rossini
Gioachino Rossini (1792–1868) an operatic Italian composer, the best known as his operas William Tell Overture and The Barber of Seville.
Ottorino Respighi
Ottorino Respighi (1879–1936) was an Italian composer whose orchestral music unabashedly celebrates Italian culture. His Ancient Airs and Dances suites and The Birds suite were orchestral arrangements of early instrumental works by predominantly Italian composers, such as Bernardo Pasquini and Simone Molinaro. His Roman Trilogy depicts different scenes of the city: Fountains of Rome has movements illustrating different fountains in the city, Pines of Rome depicts different pine trees throughout the day, and Roman Festivals dedicates movements to different celebrations in Rome's history. Respighi also composed his Trittico Botticelliano based on paintings by the namesake Sandro Botticelli.

== Japan ==
Akira Ifukube
Akira Ifukube (伊福部 昭, Ifukube Akira, 31 May 1914 – 8 February 2006) was a Japanese composer.

Fumio Hayasaka
Fumio Hayasaka (早坂 文雄 Hayasaka Fumio; August 19, 1914 – October 15, 1955) was a Japanese composer of classical music and film scores.

== Mexico ==
A nationalistic renascence in the arts was produced by the Mexican Revolution of 1910–1920. Álvaro Obregón's regime, inaugurated in 1921, provided a large budget for the Secretariat of Public Education, under the direction of José Vasconcelos, who commissioned paintings for public buildings from artists such as José Clemente Orozco, Diego Rivera, and David Alfaro Siqueiros. As part of this ambitious programme, Vasconcelos also commissioned musical compositions on nationalistic themes. One of the first such works was the Aztec-themed ballet El fuego nuevo (The New Fire) by Carlos Chávez, composed in 1921 but not performed until 1928.

Manuel M. Ponce
Manuel M. Ponce (1882–1948) was a composer, educator and scholar of Mexican music. Among his works are the lullaby La Rancherita (1907), Scherzino Mexicano (1909) composed in the style of sones and huapangos, Rapsodía Mexicana, No 1 (1911) based on the jarabe tapatío, and the romantic ballad Estrellita (1912).
Carlos Chávez
Carlos Chávez (1899–1978) was a Mexican composer, conductor, educator, journalist, and founder and director of the Mexican Symphonic Orchestra and the National Institute of Fine Arts (INBA). Some of his music was influenced by indigenous Mexican cultures. A period of nationalistic leanings initiated in 1921 with the Aztec-themed ballet El fuego nuevo (The New Fire), followed by a second ballet, Los cuatro soles (The Four Suns), in 1925.

== Netherlands ==
Bernard Zweers
Bernard Zweers (1854–1924) was a Dutch composer, he strived to develop a specifically Dutch brand of music, free from foreign influence. For instance, his vocal music only employs Dutch-language texts, and when it has a programme, that is frequently inspired by Dutch themes: Rembrandt, Vondel's Gijsbrecht van Aemstel, Dutch landscapes, and so forth. His aim was the greater good of Dutch art, because "Never will art get a foothold with a people, when it uses a foreign language in song, or when it takes in art by means of foreign tongues." His Third Symphony (1887–1889) is regarded as a milestone in the development of Dutch music, combining folk tunes with a lyrical description of Dutch landscapes.

== Norway ==
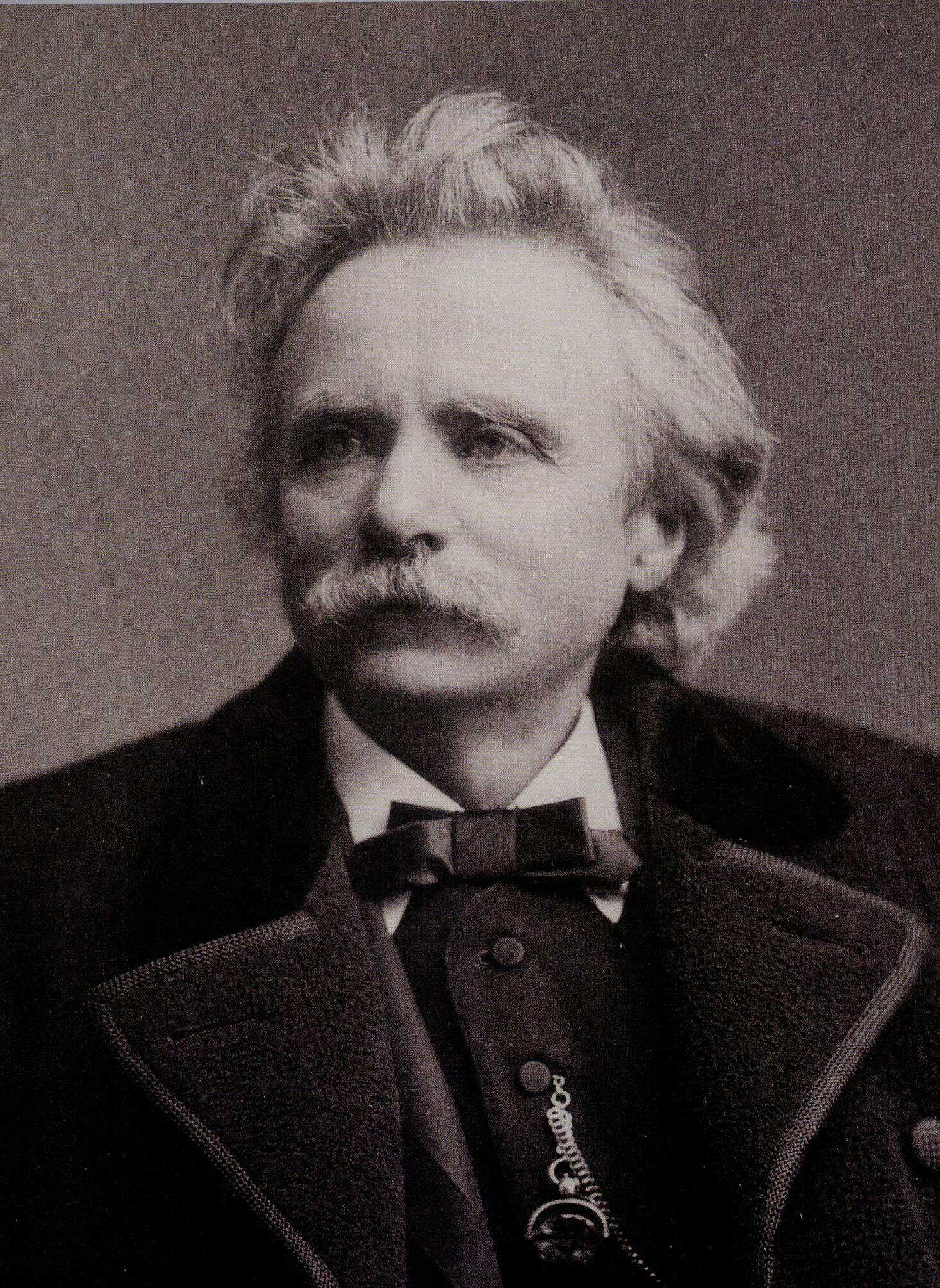
Edvard Grieg

Edvard Grieg
Edvard Grieg (1843–1907) was an important Romantic era composer whose music helped establish a Norwegian national identity.
Agathe Backer Grøndahl
Agathe Backer Grøndahl (1847–1907) was a Romantic era pianist, composer, and a close friend of Edvard Grieg.
Christian Sinding
Christian Sinding (1856–1941) was a Norwegian composer.
Johan Halvorsen
Johan Halvorsen (1864–1935) was a Romantic era composer, conductor, and violinist.

== Poland ==
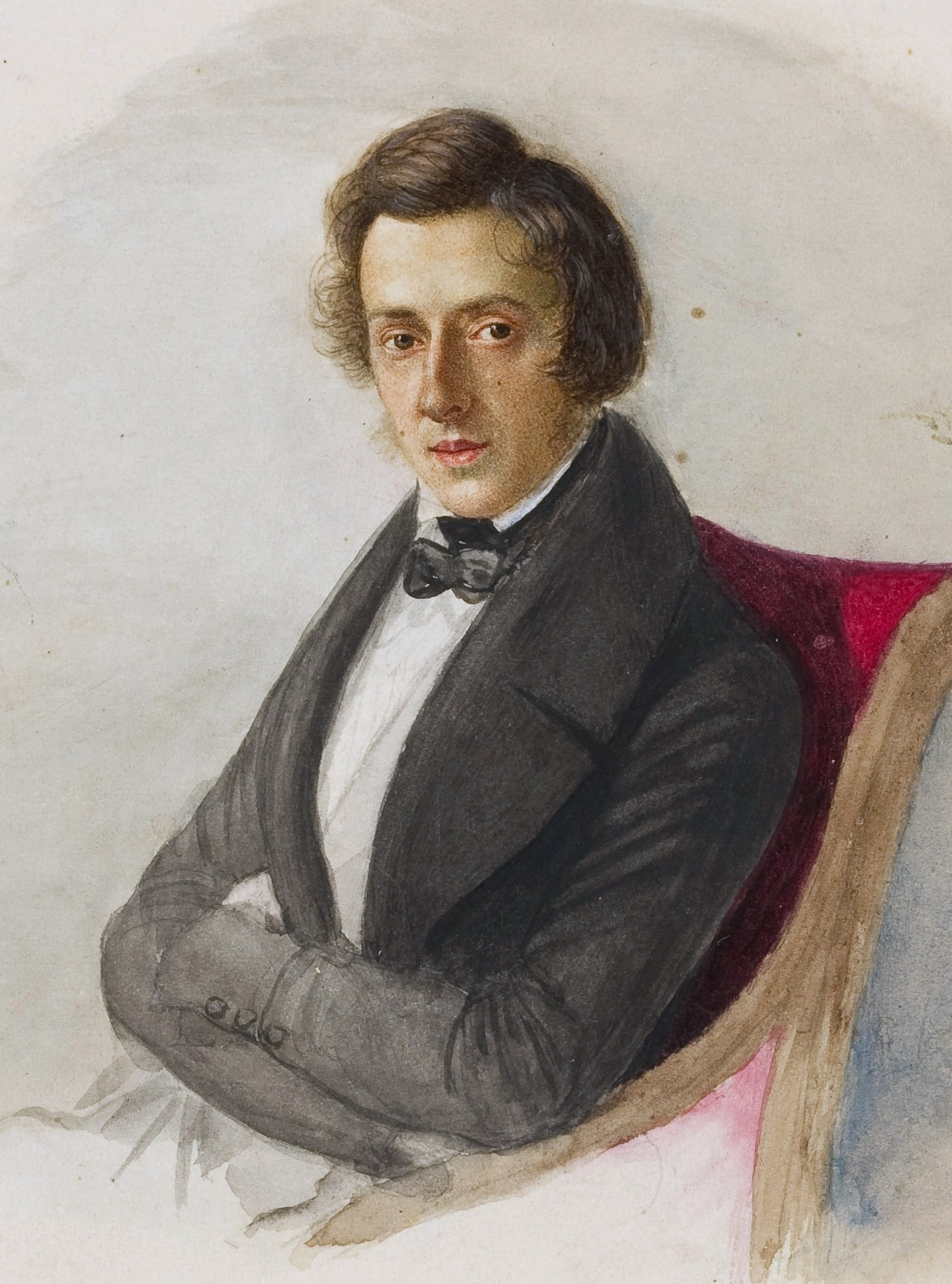
Frédéric Chopin

Jan Stefani
Jan Stefani (1746–1829) composed the Singspiel Cud mniemany, czyli Krakowiacy i górali (The Supposed Miracle, or the Cracovians and the Highlanders), which premiered in 1794 and contains krakowiaks, polonaises, and mazurkas that were adopted as if they were Polish folk music by audiences at the 1816 revival with new music by Karol Kurpiński. The suggestive lyrics of many of the songs could scarcely have been interpreted by the Polish audiences at the verge of the outbreak of the Kościuszko Uprising as anything other than a call for revolution, national unity, and independence. In this sense, despite his obscurity today, Stefani must be regarded as a precursor and founder of nineteenth-century musical nationalism.
Frédéric Chopin
Frédéric Chopin (1810–1849) was one of the first composers to incorporate nationalistic elements into his compositions. Joseph Machlis states, "Poland's struggle for freedom from tsarist rule aroused the national poet in Poland. ... Examples of musical nationalism abound in the output of the romantic era. The folk idiom is prominent in the Mazurkas of Chopin". His mazurkas and polonaises are particularly notable for their use of nationalistic rhythms. Moreover, "During World War II the Nazis forbade the playing of ... Chopin's Polonaises in Warsaw because of the powerful symbolism residing in these works."
Stanisław Moniuszko
Stanisław Moniuszko (1819–1872) has become associated above all with the concept of a national style in opera. Moniuszko's opera and music as a whole is representative of 19th-century romanticism, given the extensive use by the composer of arias, recitatives and ensembles that feature strongly in his operas. The source of Moniuszko's melodies and rhythmic patterns often lies in Polish musical folklore. One of the most visibly Polish aspects of his music is in the forms he uses, including dances popular among upper classes such as polonaise and mazurka, and folk tunes and dances such as kujawiak and krakowiak.
Henryk Wieniawski
Henryk Wieniawski (1835–1880) was another important composer using Polish folk melodies—he wrote several mazurkas for solo violin and piano accompaniment, one of which being the popular "Obertass" in G major.
Ignacy Jan Paderewski
Ignacy Jan Paderewski (1860–1941) was a Polish pianist, composer, diplomat, and spokesman for Polish independence, who also became Prime Minister of the newly independent Poland in 1919. He wrote several pieces inspired by Polish folk music, such as polonaises and mazurkas for solo piano or his Polish Fantasy for piano and orchestra. His last work, the monumental Symphony in B minor "Polonia", is a programme symphony representing the Polish struggle for independence in the early 20th century.

== Romania ==
Ion Ivanovici
Ion Ivanovici (1845 - 1902) was a Serbian-born Romanian military band conductor and composer. He is best remembered for his waltz Waves of the Danube.
George Enescu
George Enescu (1881–1955) is considered Romania's most important composer. Amongst his best-known compositions are his two Romanian Rhapsodies and his Violin Sonata No. 3 (in Romanian Folk Style), Op. 25.

== Russia ==
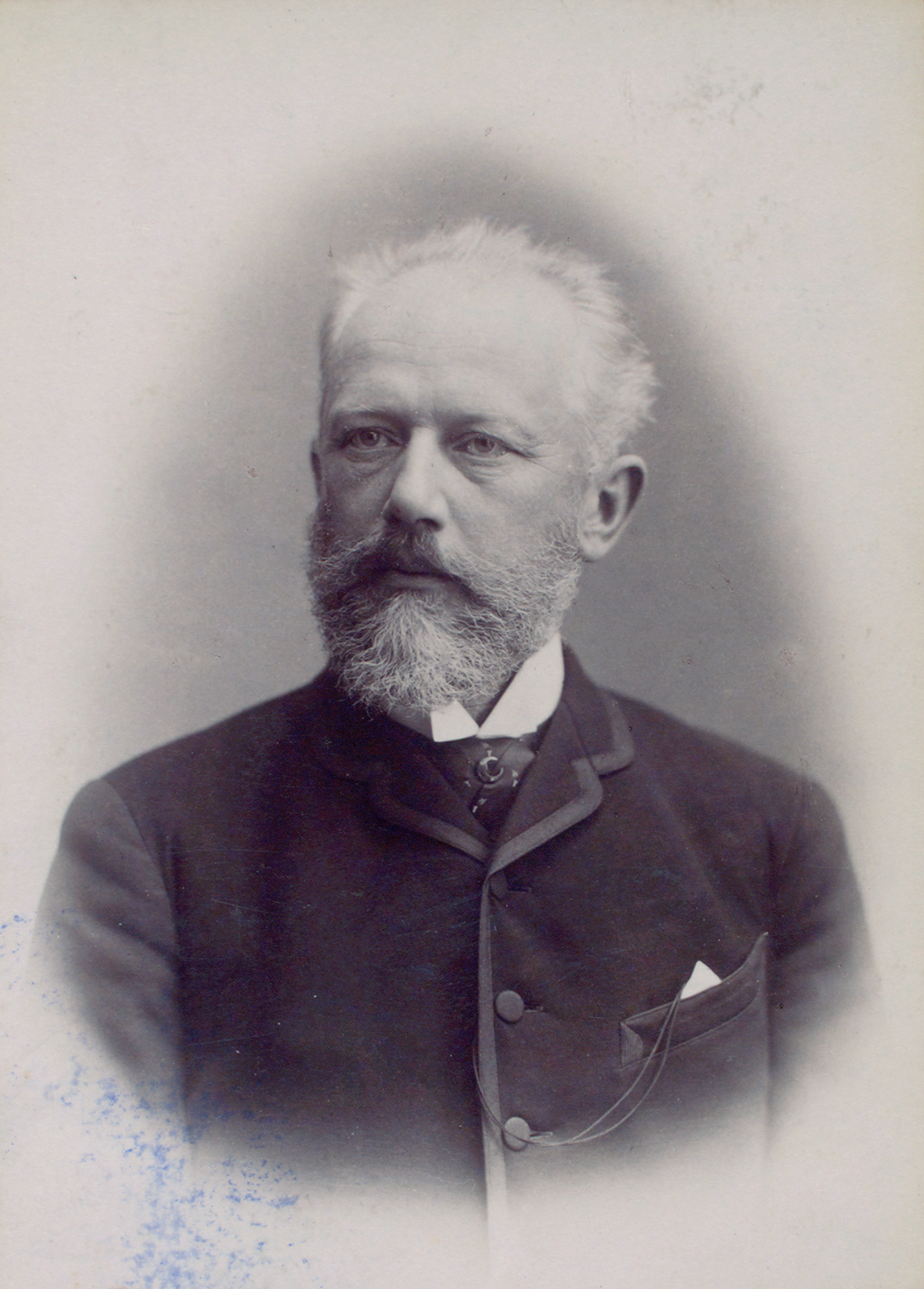
Pyotr Ilyich Tchaikovsky

Mikhail Glinka
Mikhail Glinka (1804–1857) was a Russian composer and founder of the Russian nationalist school.
Pyotr Ilyich Tchaikovsky
Pyotr Ilyich Tchaikovsky (1840–1893) was the Russian composer, which the best known as his works; The Nutcracker, Swan Lake, Romeo and Juliet, Fantasy Overture, 1812 Overture, Sleeping Beauty Waltz and the Pathetique Symphony.
The Five
The Five (also known as the Mighty Handful and the New Russian School) were five prominent 19th-century Russian composers who worked together to create a distinct Russian classical music: Mily Balakirev (the leader) (1837–1910), César Cui (1835–1918), Modest Mussorgsky (1839–1881), Nikolai Rimsky-Korsakov (1844–1908) and Alexander Borodin (1833–1887).

== Slovakia ==
Ján Levoslav Bella
Ján Levoslav Bella (1843-1936) was a respected Slovak composer who wrote songs, chamber music, and organ music.

== Spain ==
Isaac Albéniz
Isaac Albéniz (1860–1909) was a Spanish virtuoso pianist, composer, and conductor.
Enrique Granados
Enrique Granados (1867–1916) composed his work Goyescas (1911) based on the etchings of the Spanish painter, Goya. Also of a national style are his Danzas españolas and his first opera María del Carmen.
Manuel de Falla
Manuel de Falla (1876–1946) was a Spanish composer.
Joaquín Turina
Joaquín Turina (1882–1949) was a Spanish composer.
Joaquín Rodrigo
Joaquín Rodrigo (1901–1999) was a Spanish composer and a virtuoso pianist.

== Sweden ==
August Söderman
August Söderman (1832-1876) was a Swedish composer known for his lieder and choral works based on folk material.
Hugo Alfvén
Hugo Alfvén (1872–1960) studied at the music conservatory in his hometown, Stockholm. In addition to being a violinist, conductor, and composer, he was also a painter. He is perhaps best known for his five symphonies and three Swedish Rhapsodies.

== Taiwan ==
Chiang Wen-yeh
Chiang Wen-yeh or Jiang Wenye (Chinese: 江文也; pinyin: Jiāng Wényě, June 11, 1910 – October 24, 1983) was a Taiwanese composer, active mainly in Japan and later in China.

== Ukraine ==
In Ukraine the term "Music nationalism" (Ukrainian: музичний націоналізм) was coined by Stanyslav Lyudkevych in 1905. The article under this title is devoted to Mykola Lysenko who is considered to be the father of Ukrainian classical music. Ludkevych concludes that Lysenko's nationalism was inspired by those of Glinka in Russian music, though western tradition, particularly German, is still significant in his music, especially instrumental.

V. Hrabovsky assumes that Stanyslav Lyudkevych himself could be considered as significant nationalistic composer and musicologist thanks to his numerous composition under Ukraine-devoted titles as well as numerous papers devoted to use of Ukrainian folk songs and poetry in Ukrainian classical music.

Inspiration by Ukrainian folklore could be observed even earlier, particularly in compositions by Maxim Berezovsky (1745–1777), Dmitry Bortniansky (1751–1825), and Artemy Vedel (1767–1808). Semen Hulak-Artemovsky (1813–1873) is considered to be the author of the first Ukrainian opera (Zaporozhets za Dunayem, premièred in 1863). Lysenko's traditions were continued by, among others, Kyrylo Stetsenko (1882–1922), Mykola Leontovych (1877–1921), Yakiv Stepovy (1883–1921), Alexander Koshetz (1877–1944), and later, Levko Revutsky (1889–1977).

At the same time the term "nationalism" is not used in Ukrainian musicology (see for example (Yutsevych 2009), where such term is missing). Moreover, the article "Music Nationalism" by Ludkevych was prohibited in the USSR and was not widely known until its publication in 1999.

== United Kingdom ==
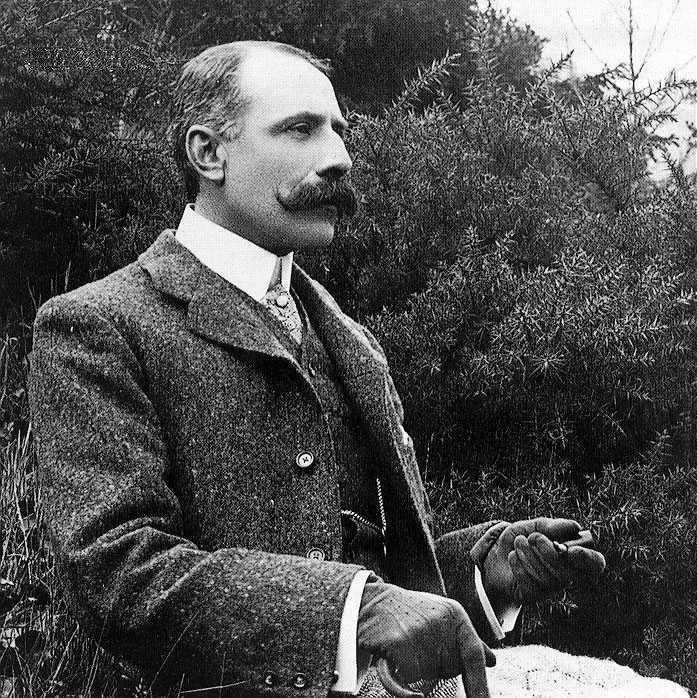
Edward Elgar

Joseph Parry
Joseph Parry (1841–1903) was born in Wales, but moved to the United States as a child. In his adulthood, he traveled between Wales and America, and performed Welsh songs and glees with Welsh texts in recitals. He composed the first Welsh opera, Blodwen, in 1878.
Alexander Mackenzie
Alexander Mackenzie (1847–1935) wrote a Highland Ballad for violin and orchestra (1893), and the Scottish Concerto for piano and orchestra (1897). He also composed the Canadian Rhapsody. In his life, MacKenzie witnessed both the survivals of Jacobite culture, and the Red Clydeside Era. His music is heavily influenced by Jacobite art.
Charles Villiers Stanford
Charles Villiers Stanford (1852–1924) wrote five Irish Rhapsodies (1901–1914). He published volumes of Irish folk song arrangements, and his third symphony is titled the Irish symphony. In addition to being heavily influenced by Irish culture and folk music, he was particularly influenced by Johannes Brahms.
Edward Elgar
Edward Elgar (1857–1934) is best known for the Pomp and Circumstance Marches, the most famous of which is played every year as part of the "Last Night of the Proms" concert.
Ralph Vaughan Williams
Ralph Vaughan Williams (1872–1958) collected, published, and arranged many folksongs from across the country, and wrote many pieces, large and small scale, based on folk melodies, such as the Fantasia on Greensleeves and the Five Variants on "Dives and Lazarus. Vaughan Williams helped define musical nationalism, writing that "The art of music above all the other arts is the expression of the soul of a nation."

== United States ==
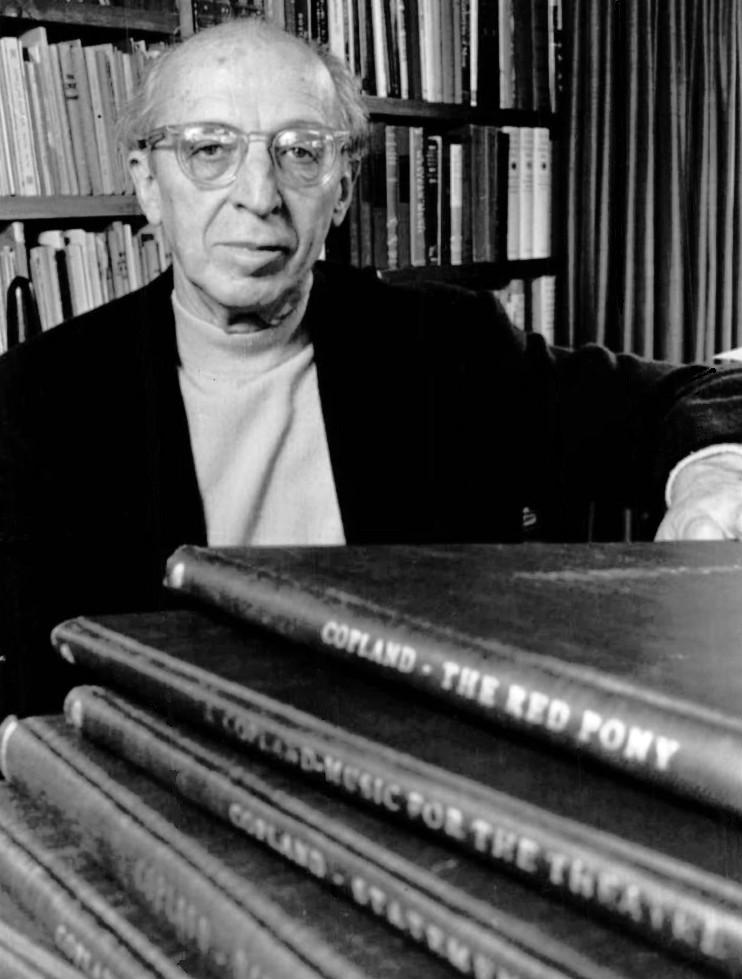
Aaron Copland

Francis Hopkinson
Francis Hopkinson (1737–1791) was not only a composer but a lawyer, author, jurist, and most importantly, an American Founding Father. He also composed the first American opera, Temple of Minerva (1781).
Edward MacDowell
Edward MacDowell (1860–1908)'s Woodland Sketches, Op. 51 (1896) consists of ten short piano pieces bearing titles referring to the American landscape. In this way, they make a claim to MacDowell's identity as an American composer.
Henry Cowell
Henry Cowell (1897–1965) was an American avant-garde composer who wrote music inspired by American folk tunes.
Horatio Parker
Horatio Parker (1863–1919) was an American composer, organist and teacher.
Charles Ives
Charles Ives (1874–1954) was an American modernist composer, being one of the first American composers of international renown. He frequently employed quotation of popular American songs and referenced the holidays and landscapes of New England, such as in Three Places in New England, Central Park in the Dark, and A Symphony: New England Holidays.
Aaron Copland
Ironically, Aaron Copland (1900–1990) composed "Mexican" music such as El Salón México in addition to his American nationalist works. Aaron Copland’s most notable work, Appalachian Spring is a prime example of American musical nationalism. This composition incorporates one of the most recognizable American folk themes, the Shaker melody ‘Simple Gifts’ in a way that transcended social and generic categories due to its impactful orchestration and message. This tune frames the American identity as something simple and free, something society was yearning for in a post World War II environment. This work quickly became widely recognized as a canon work in American Band Literature.
