= Love and Malice =

- Opera by Vatroslav Lisinski
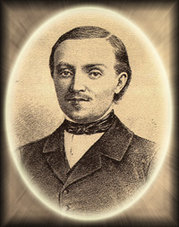
- Native title: Ljubav i zloba
- Librettist: Dimitrija Demeter
- Language: Croatian
- Premiere: 28 March 1846; Old City Hall in Zagreb

Love and Malice (Croatian: Ljubav i zloba) is an opera in two acts composed by Vatroslav Lisinski to a libretto by Dimitrija Demeter. It premiered on 28 March 1846 in Zagreb and is considered to be the first Croatian national opera, making Croatia the second Slavic nation to have its national opera. Its premiere had been delayed when the singer who was to take the leading male role was shot and seriously injured during the Austrian crackdown on Croatian nationalists in July 1845. Most of the protestors who were shot were (like the composer himself) adherents of the Illyrian Movement.

== Idea for opera ==
Members of the Illyrian movement thought for a long time that someone should write a Croatian national opera based on the first Slavic national opera, A Life for the Tsar by Mikhail Glinka. Young Lisinski, author of music for reveille Prosto zrakom ptica leti (Bird flies freely through the air), seemed as a good choice.

Libretto for opera was written by Josip Car who based it on the idea of Alberto Ognjen Štriga. Libretto was then reworked by Dimitrija Demeter (who is considered to be its author), while the instrumentation was refined by JK Wisner Morgenstern, Lisinski's music teacher.

Events surrounding the July victims in the summer of 1845 delayed rehearsals and premiere for March of 1846.

== Premiere ==
When Lisinski and Demeter finished the Opera, they contacted Countess Sidonija Rubido, opera singer educated in Vienna. She got main role of Ljubica and performed on premiere and four more screenings in March and April 1846. After that, Countess Rubido was no longer publicly performing. She is remembered as the first Croatian opera singer.

After extensive preparations Opera was first performed on March 28, 1846 in the Old City Hall in Zagreb, ten years after Glinka's Life for the Tsar and twenty before Smetana's The Bartered Bride. Besides great success of the first performance and favorable social and cultural circumstances, Opera's protagonists also contributed to its popularity: Countess Sidonija Rubido as Ljubica, Franjo Stazić (later known as Franz Steger/Stéger Xavér Ferenc, leading tenor of the Vienna Court Opera) as Vukosav, and Alberto Ognjan Štriga.

== Plot ==
=== First act ===
Story takes place in the early 16th century near the town of Split. The main character is young Ljubica, daughter of Prince Velimir, who promised her hand to prince Vukosav. However, she is in love with young Obren. He is in love with her too. Vukosav finds out about that and attacks Obren. They start fencing. Prince Velimir then separates them and denies access to his home for both of them. Vukosav declares blood feud.

=== Second act ===
Ljubica and Obren meet up in the garden and he confesses his love to her. Vukosav who spied on them brings Velimir so he could see Obrenov's courtship. Velimir gets angry and leaves. Vukosav and his servant Branko hatch a plot to kidnap Ljubica and kill Velimir with the help of twelve Hajduk's. Obrenov's friend Ljudevit finds out about the plot.

Velimir forces Ljubica to write a letter to Obren in which she refuses him. Ljubica's letter breaks Obren's heart and he tries to kill himself but at that moment Hajduk's attack Velimir's estate and capture him, Obren and Ljubica. Velimir admits that he forced Ljubica to write letter to Obren. Vukosav gloats over the prisoners. Bunch of peasants led by Ljudevit suddenly show up. Vukosav tries to kill Ljubica with a knife, but Ljudevit shoots him down. At the end, all actors kneel down and start to pray.
