= Old City Hall (Zagreb) =

Building complex in Zagreb, Croatia

- Stara gradska vijećnica (in Croatian)
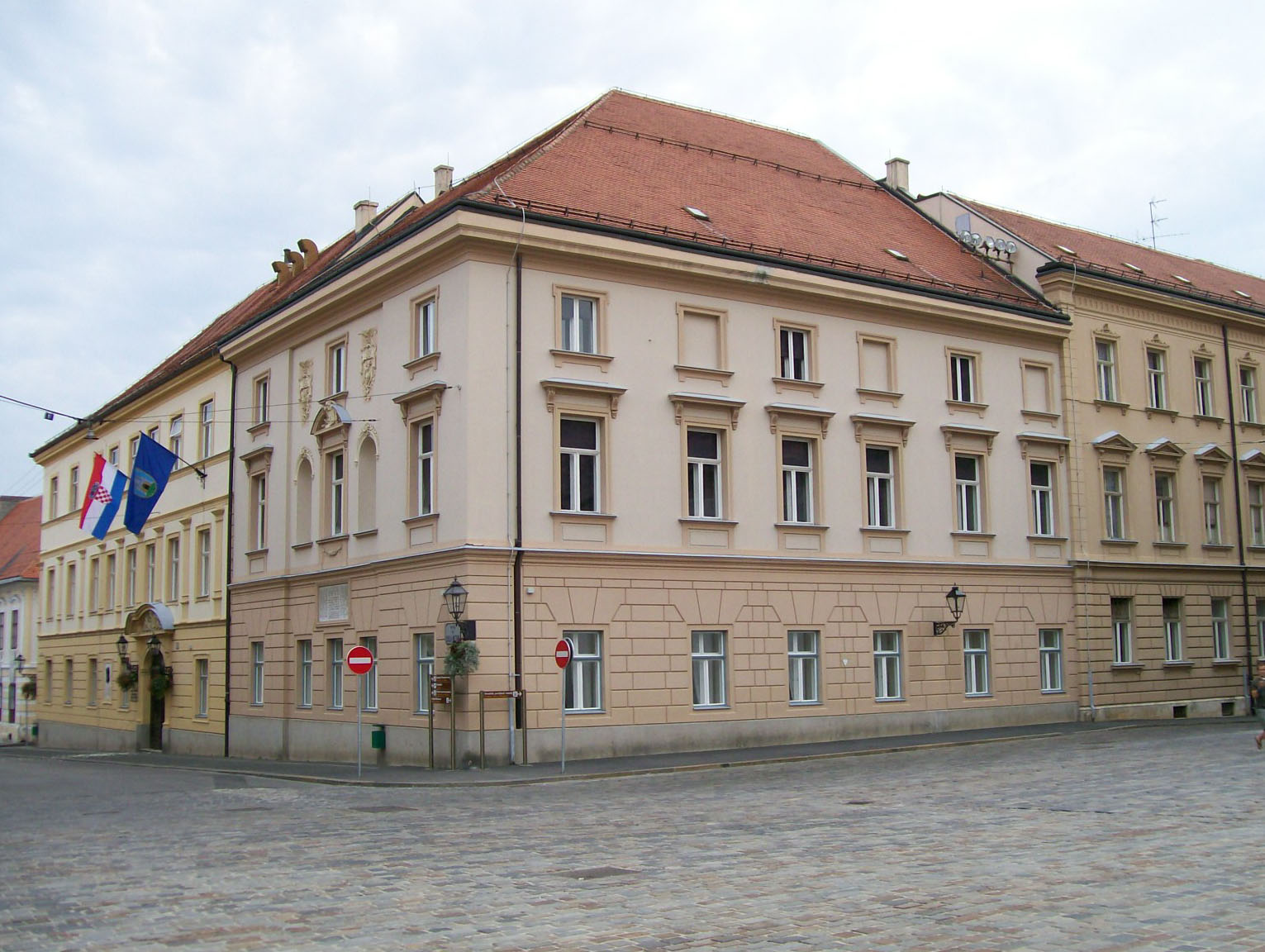
- Interactive map of the Old City Hall area
- Former names: City theatre

General information
- Location: Zagreb, Croatia
- Coordinates: 45°48′57″N 15°58′23″E
- Current tenants: Zagreb Assembly
- Inaugurated: 1897

Cultural Good of Croatia
- Type: Cultural

The Old City Hall (Croatian: Stara gradska vijećnica) is a complex of three adjacent buildings located in the Gradec neighbourhood in Zagreb, Croatia. The three buildings were joined in the late 19th century and since then, the complex has served as the place where all sessions of the city assembly are held.

== History ==
The earliest mention of the site dates from the 15th century, when a house on the same location was referred as "the Gradec city council building", and in 1614 the Gradec magistrate Jakov Gasparini had the house adapted into a town hall. According to historical records, in 1787 the building had eight rooms, a kitchen, three jails, two shops and a cellar. In 1803 the municipal authorities bought the adjacent building owned by count Adam Oršić, in order to expand the town hall. In 1832 local merchant Kristofor Stanković had won the main prize at the Vienna lottery and then decided to invest his winnings in building a city theatre. City authorities then added a second floor to Oršić's one-story house, torn down the original town hall and bought two land lots in today's Freudenreichova Street, which cleared enough space for the construction of a theatre, for which the cornerstone was laid on 12 August 1833. The theatre building, which was originally called "City theatre" (Gradsko kazalište) and later "People's theatre" (Narodno kazalište) was a one-story building with triple doors on Saints Cyril and Methodius Street, which featured a ballroom and a long gallery.

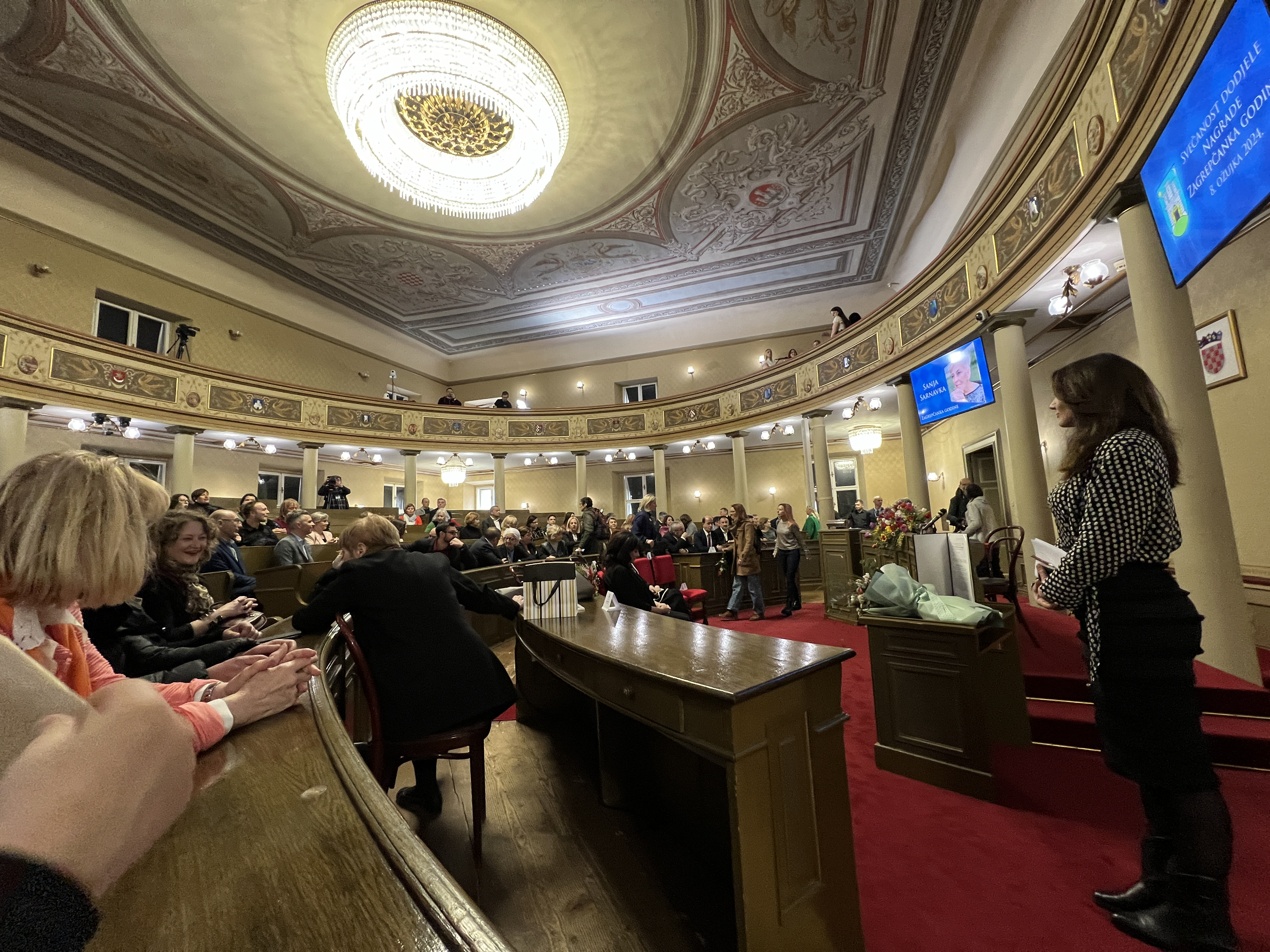
The Zagreb City Council meets in the hall.

The Croatian language was first heard in the theatre during an intermezzo of a German production, when Ljudevit Gaj's reveille "Još Hrvatska ni propala" was performed, and the first play in Croatian, the Juran and Sofia or The Turks under Sisak: Heroic Play in Three Acts (Juran i Sofia ili Turci kod Siska: junačka igra u trih činih) by Ivan Kukuljević Sakcinski, was performed there on 10 June 1840. The first Croatian opera, Love and Malice (Ljubav i zloba) by Vatroslav Lisinski, was also performed there on 28 March 1846. The ballroom also hosted a number of historically important sessions of the Croatian Parliament, most notably the one held on 23 October 1847 in which the parliament made Croatian language the official language in which to conduct its sessions.

In 1895 the new theatre building was opened (the present-day Croatian National Theatre in Zagreb) in the Lower Town area, and the theatre was moved there. Municipal government then took over the abandoned building and converted it in 1897. The city hall and the theatre building were merged, and the ballroom was converted to host sessions of the city assembly. In 1910-11 an additional two-story building in Kuševićeva Street was added and in 1941 rooms in the attic space were converted into offices.

In 1958 the city government moved to their present-day building at Stjepan Radić Square but the old town hall continued to host city assembly sessions. The building underwent restoration between 1968 and 1975, including large-scale conservation work done on the council hall and the three smaller halls on the first floor and two wedding halls on the second floor. In 1993 some municipal services were moved back to the old city hall building, including the urban planning institute's statistics department and the institute for the protection of cultural and natural heritage. In 1998 wedding halls were moved to the ground floor and in their former place on the second floor halls for special occasions named Kaptol and Grič were installed. The ground floor today houses the Kristofor Stanković Art Gallery.

== Plaques ==
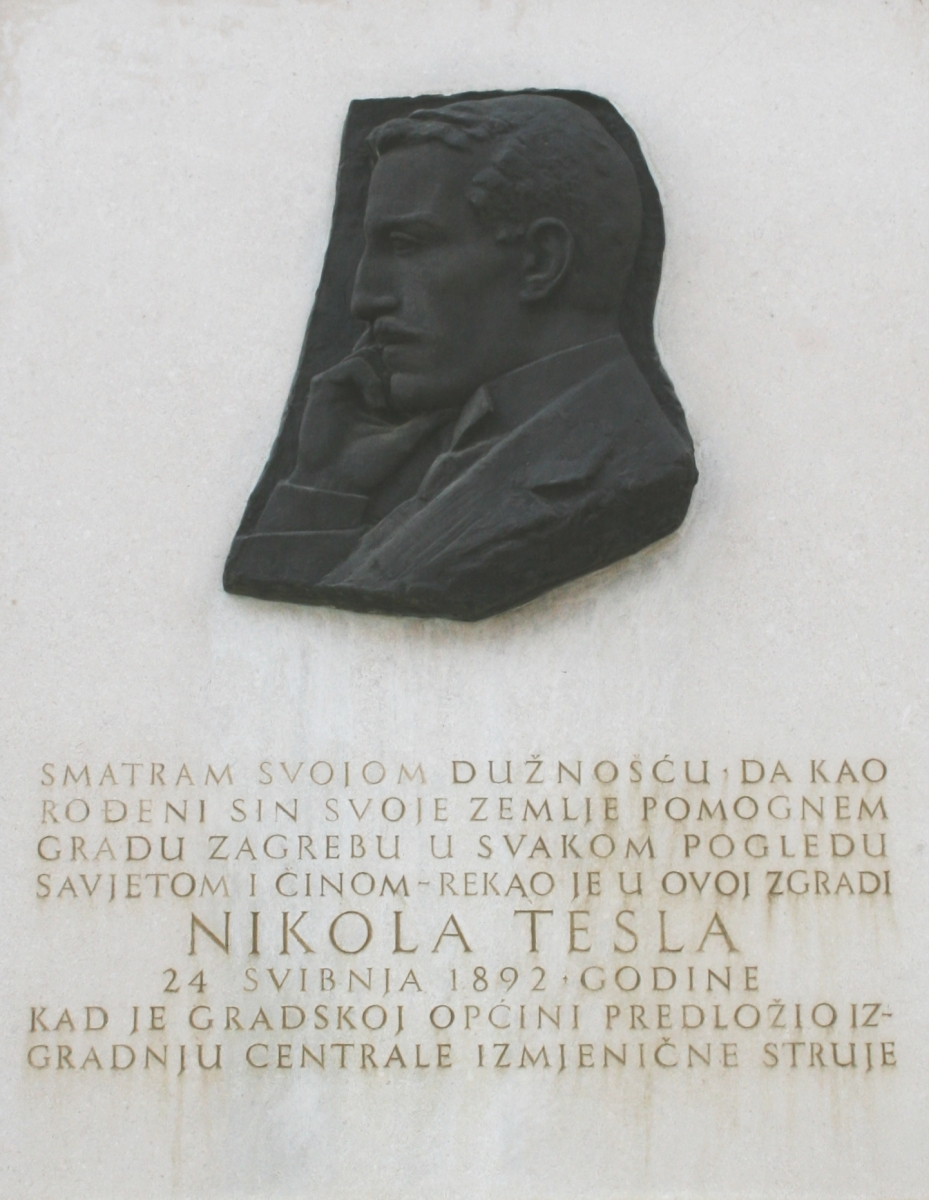
Nikola Tesla plaque commemorating his 1892 address to the city council

There are two commemorative plaques on the walls of the Old City Hall. One was put there in 1917 by the Brethren of the Croatian Dragon, a cultural heritage society, enumerating several notable events held at the building, and the other depicts a relief of Nikola Tesla, commemorating his proposal to build an alternating current power station, which he made to the city council. The plaque quotes Tesla's statement, given in the building on 24 May 1892, which reads: "As a son of this country, I consider it my duty to help the City of Zagreb in every way, either through counsel or through action" (Croatian: "Smatram svojom dužnošću da kao rođeni sin svoje zemlje pomognem gradu Zagrebu u svakom pogledu savjetom i činom"). Tesla had visited Zagreb at the invitation of mayor Milan Amruš and presented his idea of installing an electric street light system powered by a hydroelectric power plant at Plitvice Lakes. His idea was rejected and the city council chose to build a power plant near Ozalj instead.

The Old City Hall was listed in the Croatian Ministry of Culture's Protected Cultural Heritage Registry (Registar zaštićenih kulturnih dobara) in February 2003.
