= Porin =

Porin may refer to:

- Porin (protein), a transmembrane protein
- Porin (opera), a Croatian grand opera, first performed in 1897
- Porin (music award), Croatian music industry award, first awarded in 1994 and named after the opera
- Porin (ruler), the name of an early Croatian medieval leader
