= Dimitrija Demeter =

Greek-Croatian writer (1811–1872)

- Δημήτριος Δημητρίου
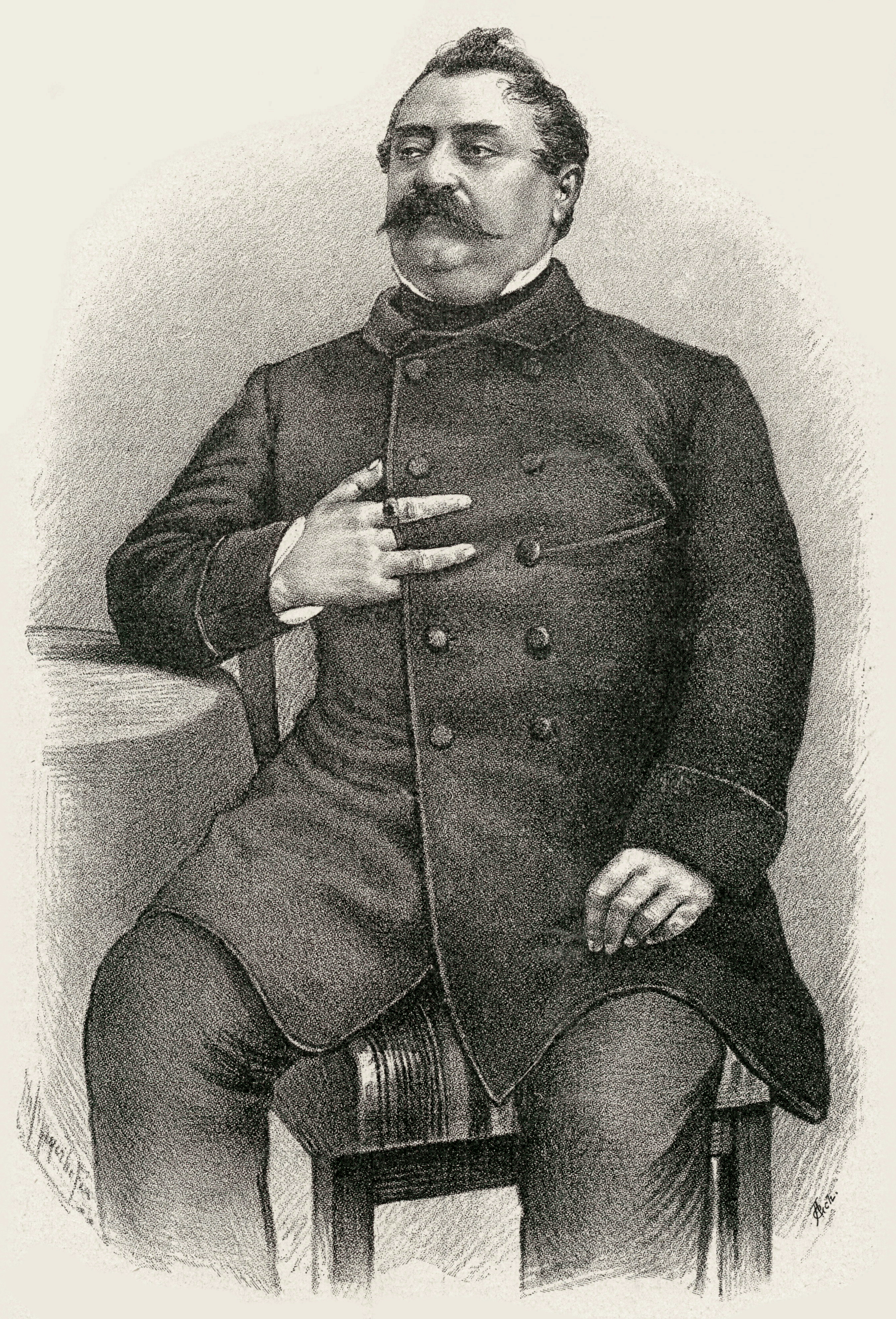
- Demeter drawn by Theodor Mayerhofer, c. 1901
- Born: Dimitrios Dimitriou; 21 July 1811; Zagreb, Kingdom of Croatia, Austrian Empire
- Died: 24 June 1872 (aged 60); Zagreb, Kingdom of Croatia-Slavonia, Austria-Hungary
- Resting place: Mirogoj Cemetery, Zagreb, Croatia
- Occupations: Poet, dramatist
- Writing career
- Language: Croatian
- Period: 1831–1872
- Genre: Romantic
- Notable works: Grobničko polje (1842); Teuta (1844)
- Movement: Illyrian movement (Romantic nationalism)

Signature
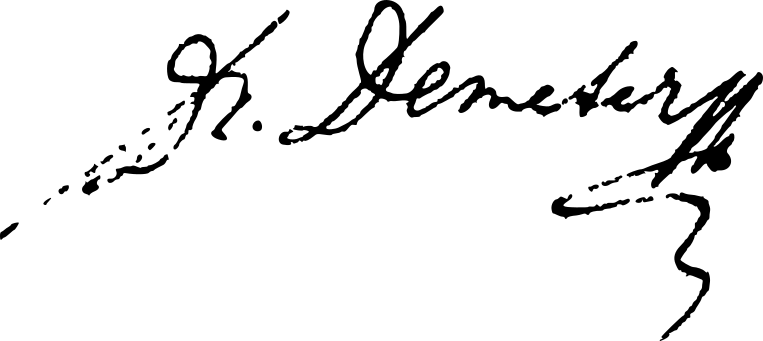

Dimitrija Demeter or Dimitrije Demeter (Greek: Δημήτριος Δημητρίου, romanized: Dimitrios Dimitriou; 21 July 1811 – 24 June 1872) was a Croatian poet, dramatist, short story writer and literary critic. One of the most learned people of his time, he played a major role in the movement for the national awakening of the Croatian nation (then under Austro-Hungarian rule) as part of what he and his close friend and colleague Ljudevit Gaj called the Illyrian people by imposing the Croatian language in the local literacy and with the creation of the Croatian National Theatre in Zagreb. His political activism for a Croatian national revival dealt through his participation in many patriotic pamphlets, most notably the Narodne novine and Hrvatski Sokol among many others.

== Biography ==
He was born in a wealthy merchant family of Greek origin. His parents Theodoros (Θεόδωρος) and Afrati (Αφράτη) came to The Habsburg monarchy in 1790 from the city of Siatista, then under Ottoman rule. Demeter's family kept this "very strong connection" to Greece, even after migrating to Croatia. His father was involved in the Greek community in Zagreb and he was among the founders, initiators, and financiers of the Greek School in Zagreb. His family also financially supported the Greek War of Independence. Demeter himself showed "pride in his illustrious ancestry", with his early Greek-language poetry being, in essence, Greek nationalist.

Demeter began his literary career writing Greek poetry from a very early age. He wrote his first drama "Βιργινία" (Virginia) at the age of 16 (also in the Greek language). He studied philosophy in Graz and medicine in Vienna and Padua. He earned his doctoral degree in Padua with thesis under the title De Meningitide. During his studies he practiced his literary work and after his return to Croatia he joined the Illyrian movement. At first he worked as a physician and from 1841 his main preoccupation was literary work.

In his most known drama Teuta, which was written in 1844 and functioned as the first national drama of the Croats, he advocates the idea of an Illyrian origin for all South Slavs. He also wrote short stories, feuilletons, literary critics, librettos for Vatroslav Lisinski opera's Ljubav i zloba and Porin and for his dramas Dramatička pokušenja I. (1834) and Dramatička pokušenja II. (1844). In his texts he tried to join the tradition of the old Croatian literature with tendentions in European drama. He mostly used historical subjects to express his patriotic aspirations and to speak out about the current social situation in society. His role in organizing the cultural life in Zagreb and Croatia was of extreme significance. He was also editor or various almanacs of patriotic orientation: Iskra, Südslavische Zeitung, Danica ilirska, Narodne novine and Hrvatski Sokol.

One of his most known works is his early Romantic poem Grobnik field (near Rijeka) written in 1842 for the 600th anniversary of the Battle of Grobnik field where according to legend Croats defeated the invading Tatars. This works shows it was written by an extremely talented writer, although it was only his literary debut. In it two main motives interweave: the motive of countryside and the motive of patriotism. Also inspired by Byron the concept of worldwide pain appears. Demeter used 10-syllable verse and 12-syllable verse to avoid monotonous routine of traditional folk songs while emphasizing characterization and strong characters of the main heroes and their passion. Instead of narrative epic tendency he gives to his poems a strong dramatic characteristics which reminds us Byron's literary work.

Demeter's main spiritual vision emphasizes on the general problems of humanity styling on the battle between good and evil where at the end the good always prevails. This type of Demeter's poems in many of his works, both by verse and rhyme, announces the most important literary work in Croatian literature of the time: the epic poem The Death of Smail-aga Čengić written by Ivan Mažuranić in 1845. Among Demeter's poems a special place also takes his Pjesma Hrvata (Song of the Croats) which is an 8-syllable verse most known by its starting verse "Prosto zrakom ptica leti".

Dimitrija Demeter was also one of the founders of the Croatian National Theatre (Hrvatsko Narodno Kazalište - HNK). When the Croatian Parliament founded the permanent theatre, Demeter was appointed as both its manager and its dramatist. 35 years after his death, in 1907, Demeter's award for drama was established which stood until nowadays.

Demeter died in Zagreb on 24 June 1872 and since he was a Greek-Orthodox he was originally buried at the Eastern Orthodox cemetery in Pantovčak neighborhood. Upon the closure of most old cemeteries in Zagreb in the 1870s and the designation of Mirogoj Cemetery as the primary municipal cemetery, his remains were moved to Mirogoj several years later, where they are still kept today. His bust decorates the yard of Croatian National Theatre in Zagreb.

== See also ==
- Vienna Literary Agreement
- Petar Preradović
- Vladan Desnica
- Lavoslav Vukelić
