= Sidonija Rubido =

Croatian opera singer

Background information
- Born: Sidonija Rubido Erdödy; 1819
- Died: 1884 (aged 64–65)
- Occupation: Opera primadonna

Countess Sidonija Rubido Erdődy (1819–1884) was Croatia's first opera primadonna and an important member of the Illyrian movement.

== Life ==
Sidonija Rubido Erdődy was born on 2 February 1819 in a small castle on Razvor estate, near a place called St Peter, above the hilltop of Sveta gora (St Mount) with the Chapel of Our Lady of Jerusalem. At that time there was no maternity hospital in Zagreb, but her name was enlisted in the registry of births within the Parish of St Mark. The Rubido family of Madrid originated in Castile, where they were ennobled in the 12th century. The Croatian branch of that family came to Croatia in the first half of the 19th century.

Sidonija started a primary school in Gornja Rijeka by initiating the building of a new school. Today the primary school in Gornja Rijeka carries her name.

Sidonija Rubido responded to the ideals of the Illyrian movement with her youth, the centuries of her heritage, and her remarkable music education. She was rehearsing a lot to perform the title role in opera Ljubav i zloba (Love and Malice) by Vatroslav Lisinski, which had the premiere on 28 March 1846.

== Legend ==
In 1858 she was, according to legend, the first to sing the Croatian anthem from her castle in Gornja Rijeka, Zagorje. But, there is no historical evidence to confirm the legend.
