= Alberto Ognjen Štriga =

Alberto Ognjen Štriga (1821–1897) was a Croatian reformer, composer and musician.

Štriga was a vocal supporter of the Illyrian movement in Croatia. He has played a substantial role in the musical life of that period as an opera singer, the initiator and organizer. He died in Zagreb on March 7, 1897.
