= Porin (opera) =

Croatian opera by Vatroslav Lisinski

Porin is a grand opera by Vatroslav Lisinski. The Croatian text was by Dimitrija Demeter. It was Lisinski's second opera, the second for Croatia.

It was composed during 1848-51 but not performed until 2 October 1897, when it was staged in Zagreb.

== Sources ==
- Lisinski, Vatroslav by Lovro Županović, in 'The New Grove Dictionary of Opera', ed. Stanley Sadie (London, 1992) ISBN 0-333-73432-7
