= Vatroslav Lisinski =

Croatian composer (1819–1854)

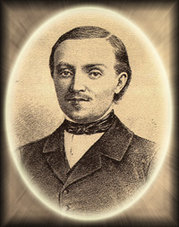
- Born: Ignatius Fuchs; 8 July 1819; Zagreb, Kingdom of Croatia, Austrian Empire
- Died: 31 May 1854 (aged 34); Zagreb, Kingdom of Croatia, Austrian Empire

Vatroslav Lisinski (Croatian: [vâtroslaːv lisǐnskiː], 8 July 1819 – 31 May 1854) was a Croatian composer.

== Biography ==
Lisinski was born Ignatius Fuchs to a German Jewish family. He later changed his name to Vatroslav Lisinski, which is a Croatian calque of his original name. For a time he worked as a clerk at the Tabula Banalis in Zagreb.

Lisinski composed the first Croatian opera, Love and Malice (1846), which he wrote at the urging of Alberto Ognjen Štriga, and Porin (1851) as well as numerous works for orchestra, choir and soloists.

He was also one of the founders of Illyrism, a movement that advocated the importance of Croatian and more generally South Slavic cultural heritage, as a reaction to Magyarisation during the Austro-Hungarian rule.

Lisinski died in Zagreb on 31 May 1854 and was buried at the Mirogoj Cemetery.

== Legacy ==
In 1944, Oktavijan Miletić directed a movie about him, Lisinski. The Vatroslav Lisinski Concert Hall was named after him in 1973.

The international train EN 498/499 connecting Zagreb and Munich is named Lisinski, after the composer.
