= Croatian art =

Croatian art describes the visual arts in Croatia, and art by Croatian artists from prehistoric times to the present. In Early Middle Ages, Croatia was an important centre for art and architecture in south eastern Europe. There were many Croatian artists during the Medieval period, and the arts flourished during the Renaissance. Later styles in Croatia included Baroque and Rococo.

== Ancient heritage ==
=== Prehistoric art ===
The Neolithic inhabitants of the Adriatic Coast and those on the Pannonian plain, developed their cultures within the boundaries of present-day Croatia. The Neolithic is marked by the production of ceramics and sculptures with human and animal themes presented as symbolic art. In contrast to the cave paintings of the palaeolithic age, in the more settled agricultural age, pottery became the main art form, with stylised forms and was primarily ornamental in character. Neolithic artists did not merely imitate or reproduce, but created new forms by inscribing geometrical patterns and decorations.

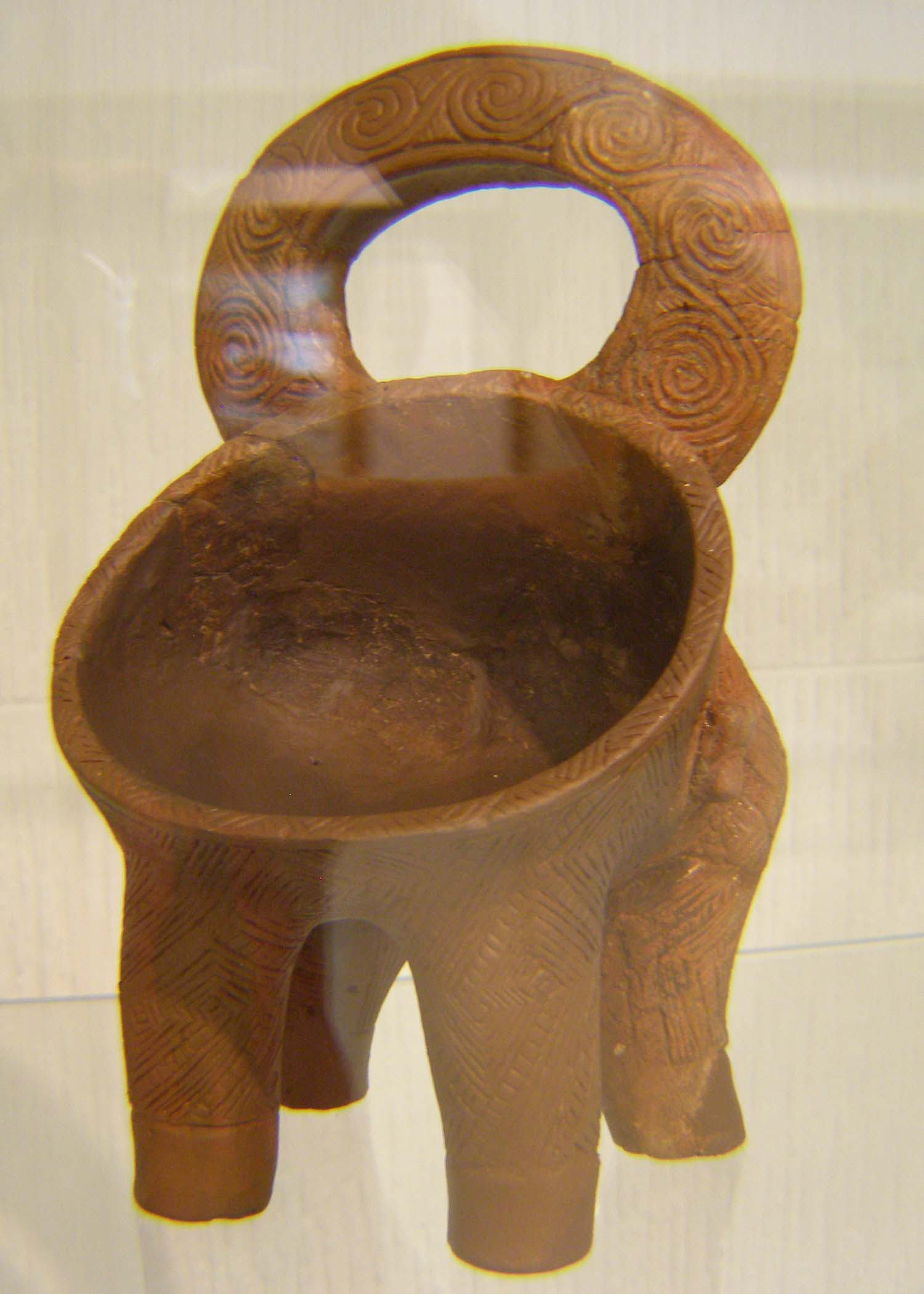
Danilo pot, showing spiral patterns

- Starčevo culture (a Pannonian plain culture) had characteristically fine red and ochre ceramics.
- Istrian culture (named after the Istrian peninsula) whose characteristic stone houses (Bunja) built using only dry-stone construction (suhozid).
- Sopot culture and Korenovo culture (named after the towns of Sopot and Korenovo in Slavonia) with original ceramic pots decorated with flat parallel lines, curves or V-shaped cuts.
- Danilo culture (found on Adriatic coast and islands) was rich with fine dark ceramics decorated with engraved geometrical motifs, spirals and meanders.
- Out of this culture developed the Hvar culture (after the island of Hvar) that is linked with Neolithic Greek cultures.

There are also Neolithic excavation sites in Ščitarjevo near Zagreb, Nakovanj on the Pelješac peninsula and elsewhere.

=== Copper Age ===
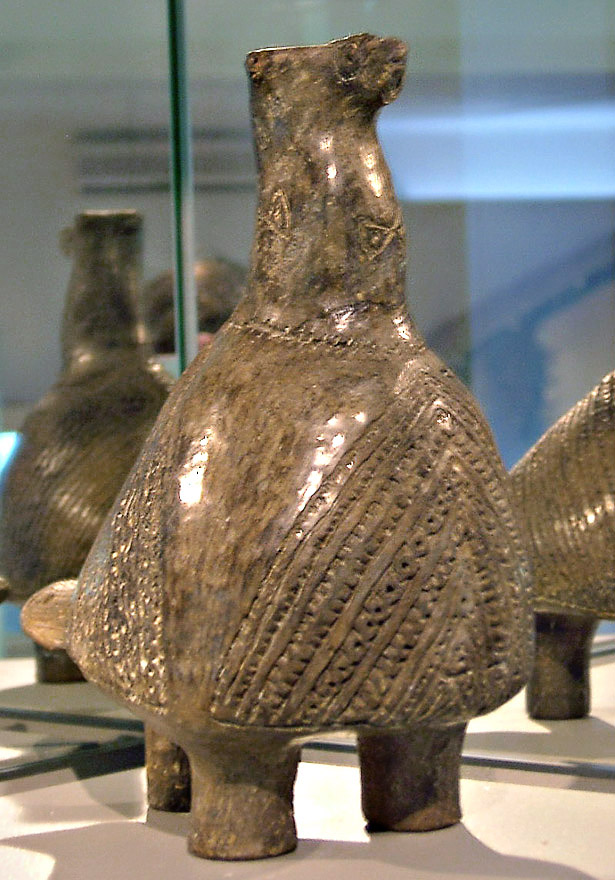
Vučedol Dove, the distinctive bird-shaped pot of the Vučedol culture

Ceramics of the Vučedol culture (named after Vučedol in eastern Slavonia) during the transitional Eneolithic period (3500-2300 BC) are of extraordinary quality with black colour, high glow and specific decorative geometrical cuts encrusted with white, red or yellow colours. The influence of metal working techniques can be seen as potters construct with sheets of clay giving distinct edges where surfaces meet and the final pot is burnished for a gleaming look.

Neolithic figurines in moulded clay were stylized versions of human (particularly female) figures, and animals. The distinctive Vučedol Dove is a pot in the shape of a bird, somewhat stylized, with impressed patterning around its body, a double-headed axe (labrys) on its neck and three legs for stability.

=== Bronze Age ===
The Bronze Age Vinkovci culture (named after the city of Vinkovci) is recognizable by its bronze fibulas that replaced previous objects like bone needles and buttons.

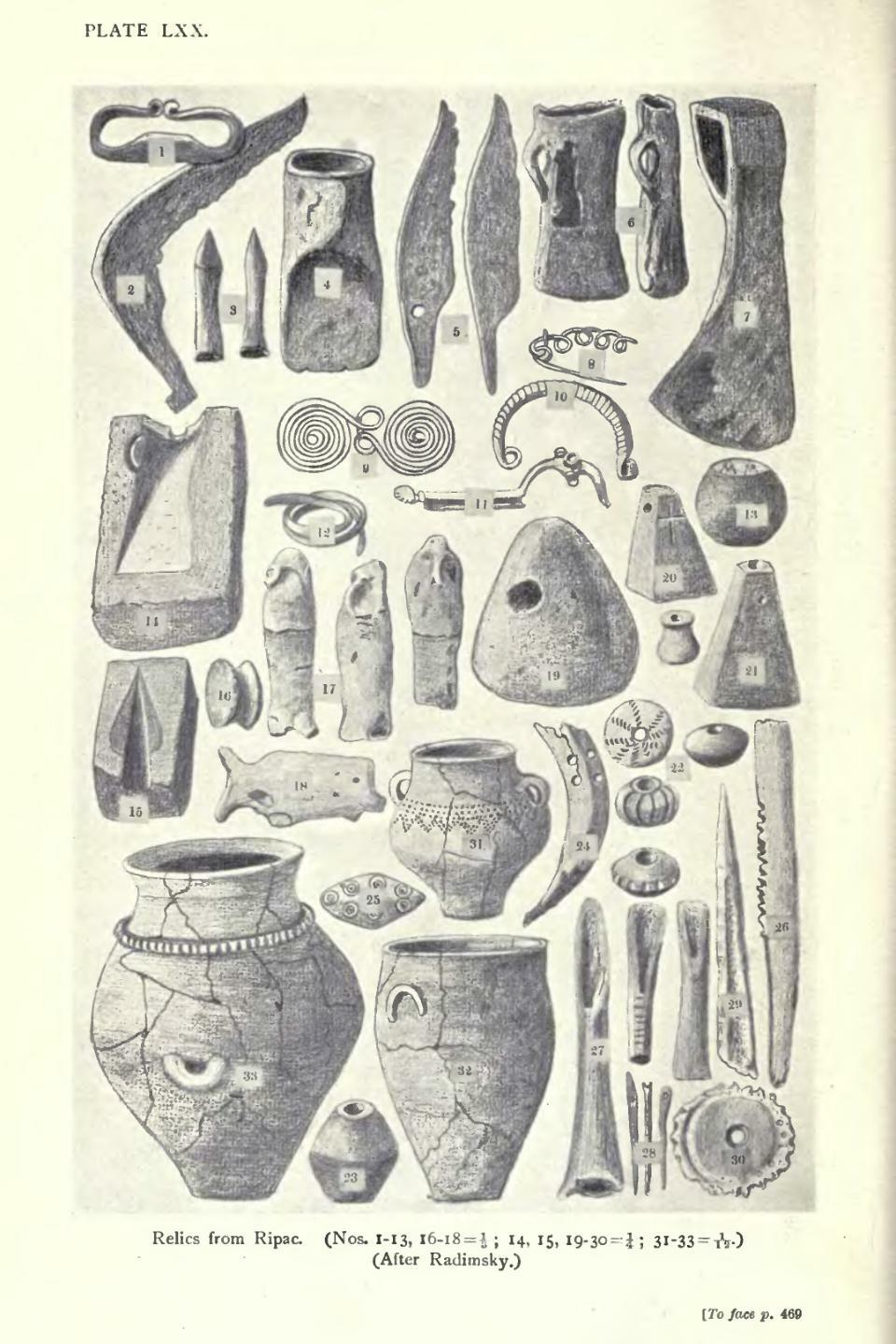
Illyrian Japodes ceramics and metalwork

The Bronze culture of the Illyrians, ethno-tribal groups with distinct cultures, and art forms started to emerge from the cultures of the Copper Age. These Illyrian ethno-tribal areas were found in present-day Croatia, and Bosnia and Hercegovina. From the 7th Century BC, iron replaced bronze for tools and implements, only jewellery and art objects were still made out of bronze. The Celtic Hallstatt culture which bordered the Balkan region where the Illyrian ethno-tribal groups were living influenced them, but the Illyrian ethno-tribal groups formed their regional centers slightly differently. In the northern Balkan Peninsula, the Illyrian ethno-tribal groups had the cult of the dead, as evidenced from the richness of and care for burial sites, from which burial ceremonies are deduced. These burial sites show a long tradition of cremation and burial in shallow graves. In the southern Balkan Peninsula, the Illyrian tribes buried their dead under large heaps stone, or earth tumuli (known locally as gromile). The Illyrian Japodes tribes had an affinity for decoration with heavy, oversized necklaces made with yellow, blue or white glass paste and they are known for their large ornamented bronze fibulas, spiral bracelets, diadems, and helmets made out of bronze. Small sculptures of jade made from the archaic Ionian plastic are also found in Japodian tribal areas. Numerous monumental sculptures are preserved, as well as walls of a citadel called Nezakcij near present-day Pula, one of the numerous Istrian cities from Iron Age.

=== Arrival of the Celts ===
The 4th century BC saw the first Celts arrive into the Illyrian areas of the Balkans; with them they brought the technique of the pottery wheel, new styles of fibulas and different bronze and iron belts, which the local Illyrian tribes had not previously developed. The Celts also mixed with the Illyrian tribal groups in Slavonia, Istria, and Dalmatia.

== Antiquity ==
=== Greek colonies ===
Greek sailors and merchants from the Greek City States of the south of the Balkan peninsula reached almost every part of Mediterranean including the Adriatic Sea coast of present-day Croatia. Other Greeks came from Syracuse on Sicily in 390 BC to the islands of Vis (Issa), Hvar (Pharos), and Korčula (Corcyra Nigra) founding city-states amongst the Illyrian ethno-tribal groups. Trading cities were founded on the Adriatic Coast such as Tragurion (today called Trogir), Salona (today called Solin near present-day Split), Epetion (today called Stobreč).

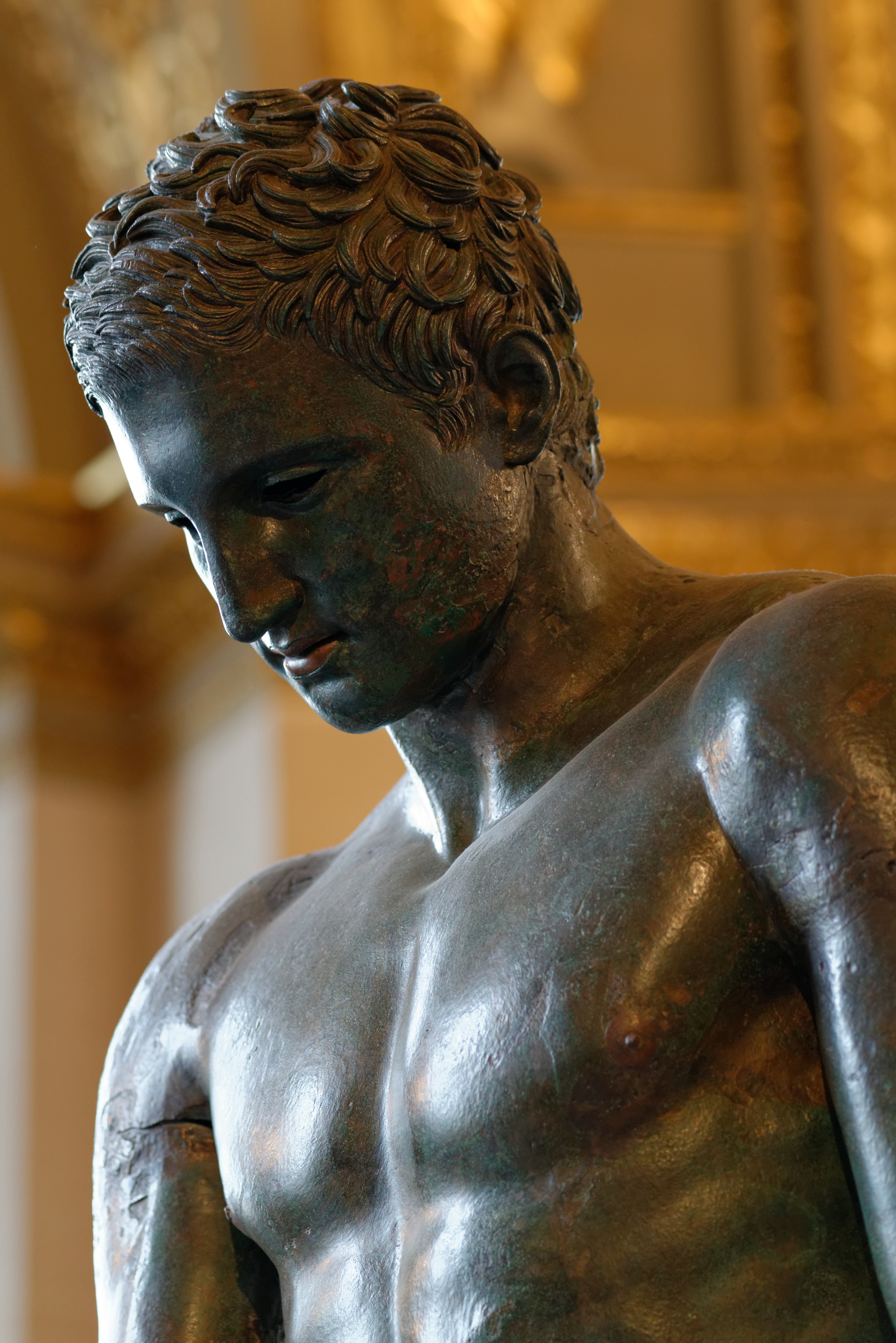
Croatian Apoxyomenos, 2nd-1st-century BC Ancient Greek statue, cast in bronze. Exhibition in Louvre Museum, Paris

These Greek cities were laid out geometrically and had villas, harbours, public buildings, temples and theatres. Pharos and Issa were strong Greek City States that showed their independence with their own coinage and maritime fleets. Unfortunately, besides painted pots and ceramic tanagra sculptures, there are few remaining daily living materials from this culture. Two of those are: the Croatian Apoxyomenos, and the Bronze head of goddess Artemis from the Greek City State of Issa, which dates from the 4th century BC. Another example is a stone relief of Kairos (god of joyfulness) from the Greek City-State Tragurion, which dates from the 3rd Century BC, and is associated with the famous Greek sculptor Lysippos.

But aside from the superficial contact of trade and warfare, life for the Greek colonists was isolated from the surrounding Illyrian peoples. The Hellenistic culture of the Greek enclaves existed in parallel with the late iron age culture of the wider Illyro-Celtic population. On the mainland the Illyrian ethno-tribal groups were organizing their centers. Illyrian art became influenced by Greek Art, and the Illyrian ethno-tribal groups copied the styles and methods of the Greeks. This can be seen, for example in the Daors tribe of the Neretva Delta.

=== Roman urbanization ===
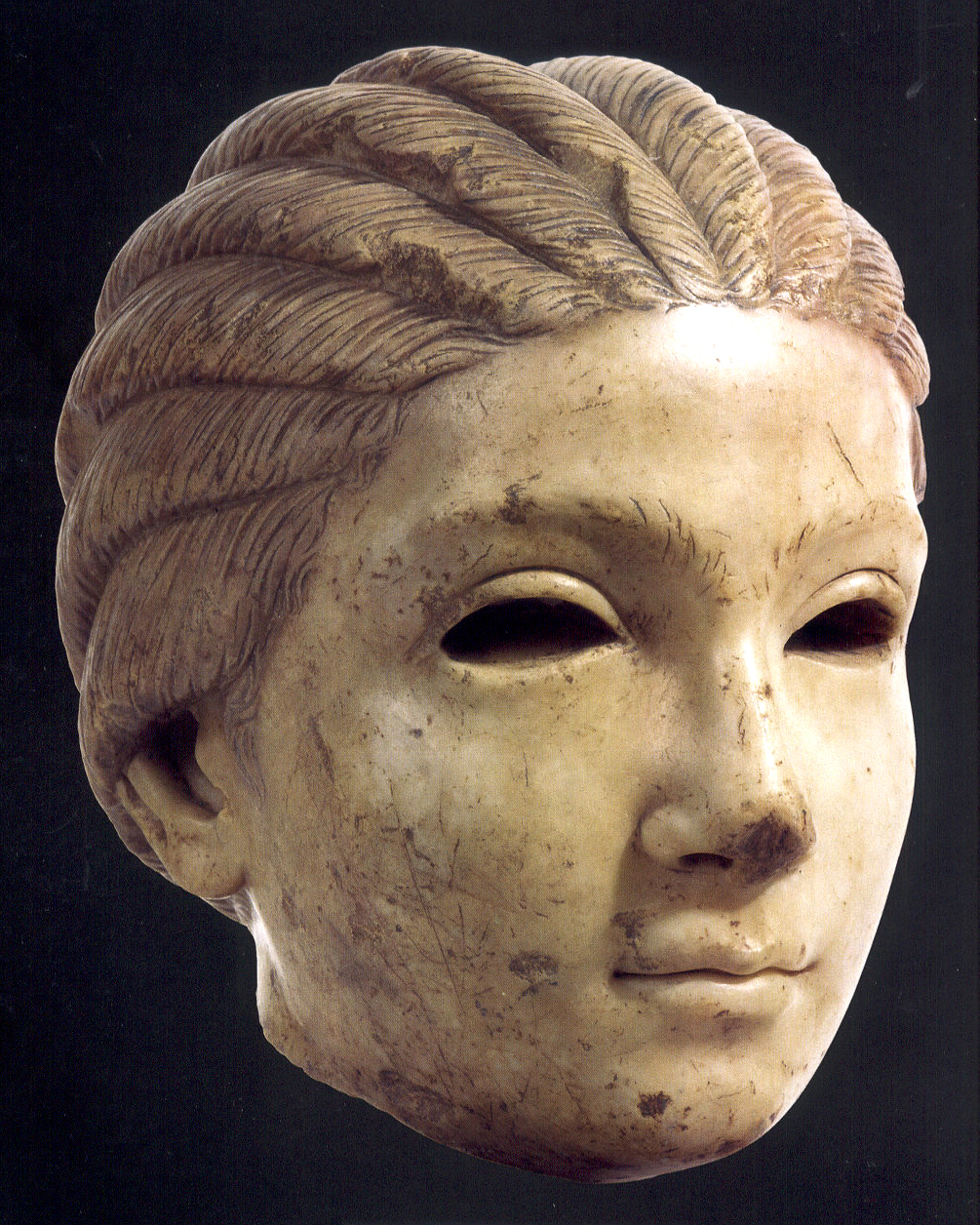
The Salona girl, marble head from Salona, 3rd century AD (Archaeological Museum in Zagreb)

In the 3rd century BC, the Romans took over the Greek colonial cities and by the 1st century BC had also subdued the Illyrians, and organized the entire coastal territory by setting up urban cities. Following the conquest, the area became a province of the Roman Empire. Numerous rustic villas, and new urban settlements (the most impressive are Verige in Brijuni, Pula and Trogir - formerly Tragurion) demonstrate high level of Roman urbanization. There were at least 30 urban cities across Istria, Liburnia and Dalmatia with Roman citizenship (civitas). The best-preserved Roman grid-pattern street layouts (decumanus/cardo) are those in Epetion (Poreč) and Jader (Zadar). The best preserved Roman monuments are in Pola (Pula); founded in the 1st century dedicated to Julius Caesar, it is full of classical Roman art such as: stonewalls, two city gates, two temples on the Forum, and remains of two theatres, as well as the Arch from the year 30 AD, and the temple of Augustus build in 2-14 AD, and finally the Fluvian Amphitheatre (so called – Arena) from the 2nd century.

By the 3rd century AD, Salona was the largest and most important city of Dalmatia, with 40,000 inhabitants. Nearby, the Emperor Diocletian, who was born in Salona, built his retirement palace (in approx 300 AD), one of the largest and most important monuments of late antique architecture. On its pathways, cellars, domes, mausoleums, arcades and courtyards can be seen numerous different art influences from the entire Empire. Some of the sculptures are: the head of a boy, girl and a woman from Salona, monumental figure of Minerva from Varaždin, the head of Hercules from Sinj, sculptures of Roman emperors from Nin and Vid near Metković, damaged sculpture of emperor in Zagreb Museum etc.

In the 4th century Salona became the centre of Christianity for the entire western Balkans. It had numerous basilicas and necropolises, and even two saints: Domnius (Duje) and Anastasius (Staš). One of the few preserved basilicas in western Europe from the time of early Byzantium is the Euphrasian Basilica in Poreč from the 6th century.

The early Middle Ages brought the great migration of the Slavs and this period was perhaps a Dark Age in the cultural sense until the successful formation of the Slavic states which coexisted with Italic cities that remained on the coast, each of them were modelled like Venice.

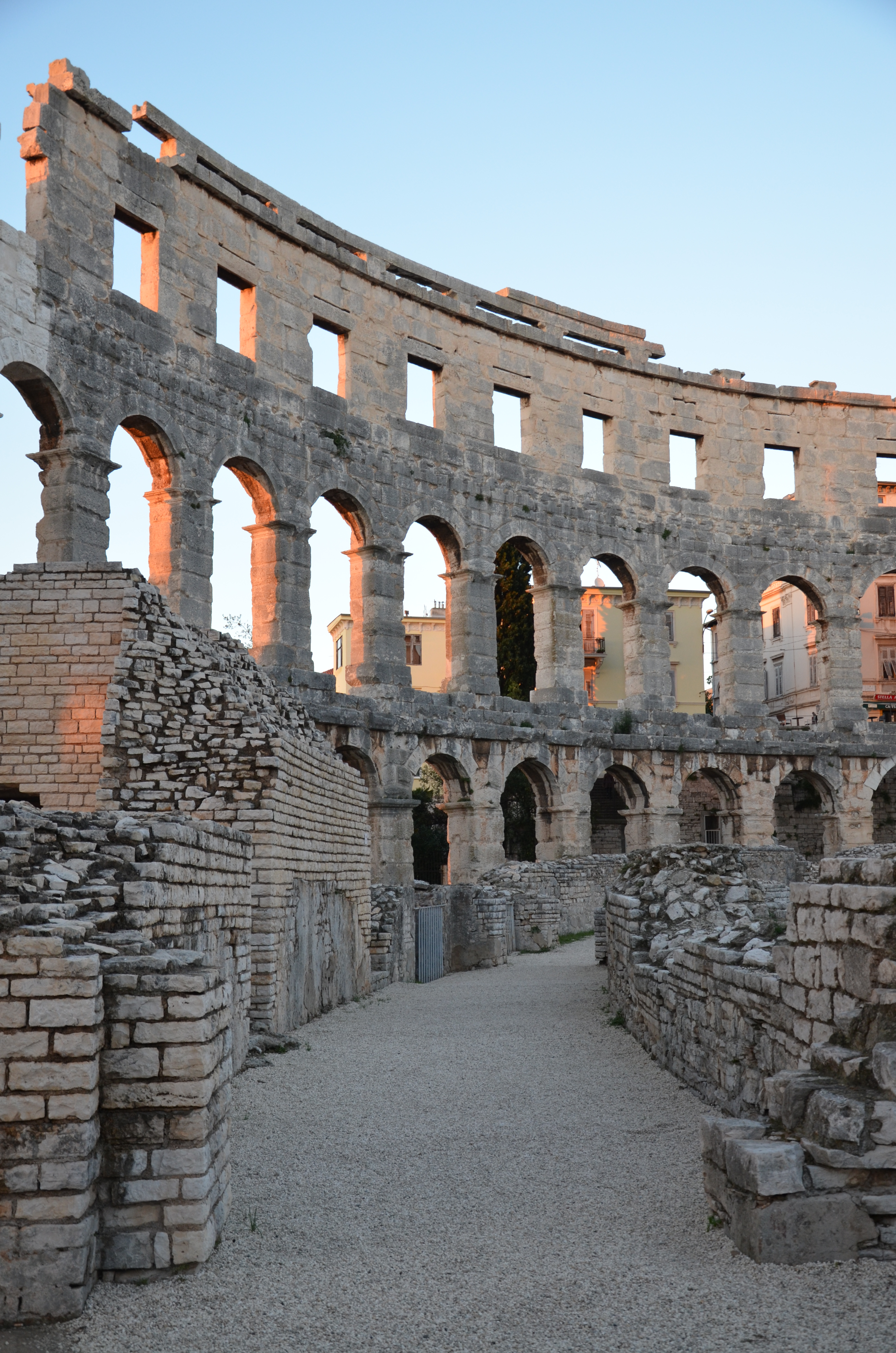
Pula Arena

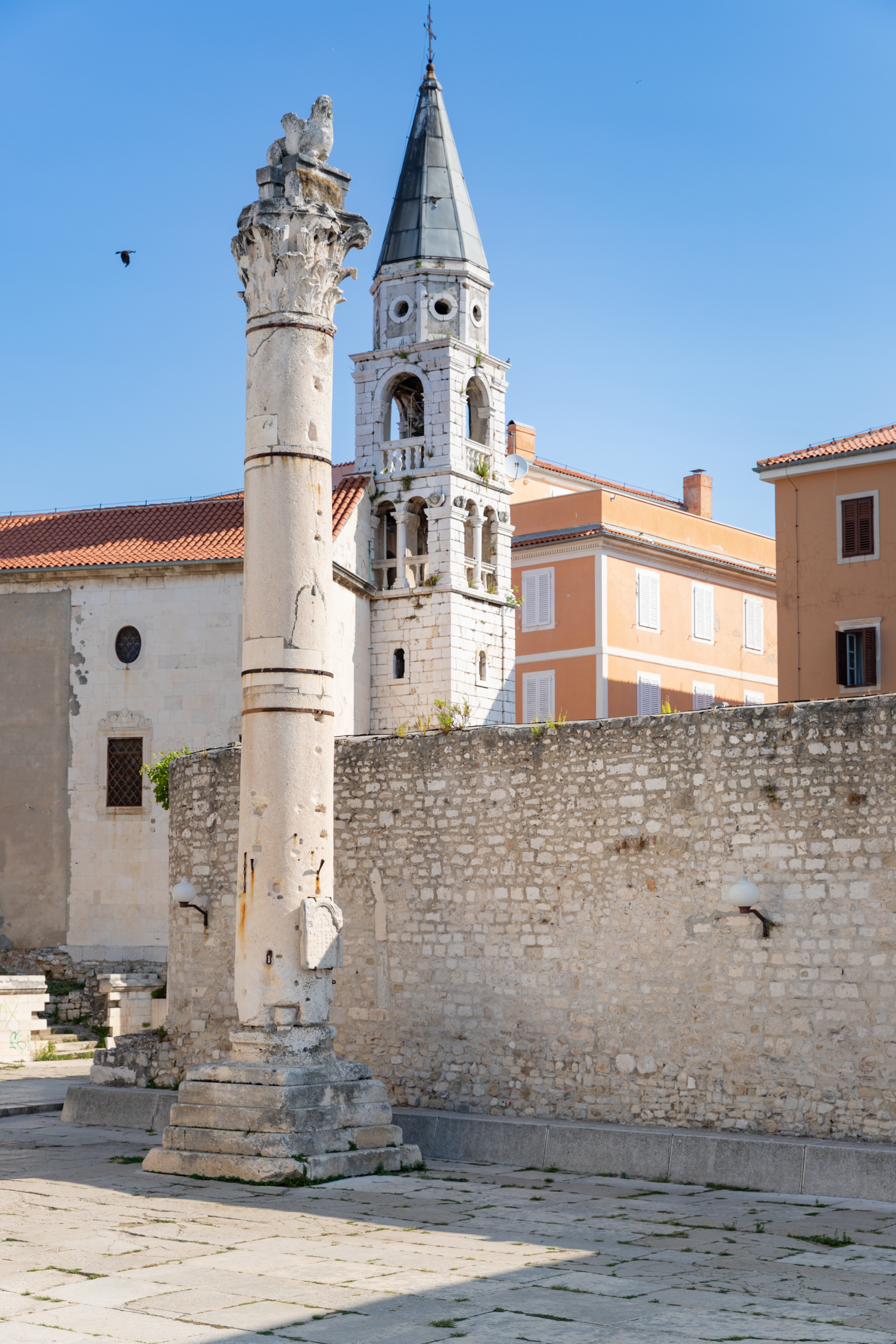
Roman column in Zadar

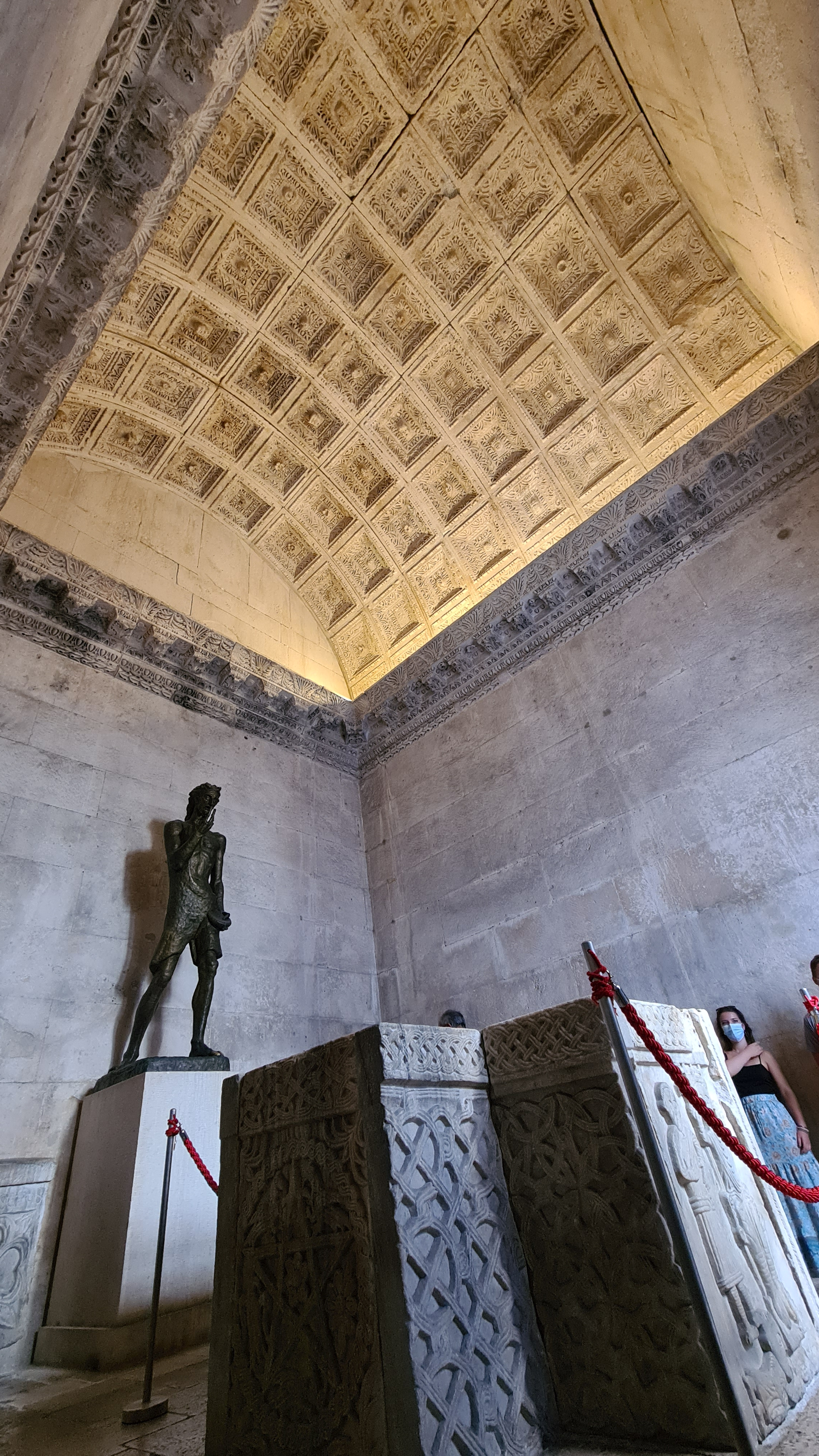
Temple of Jupiter, Diocletian's Palace in Split

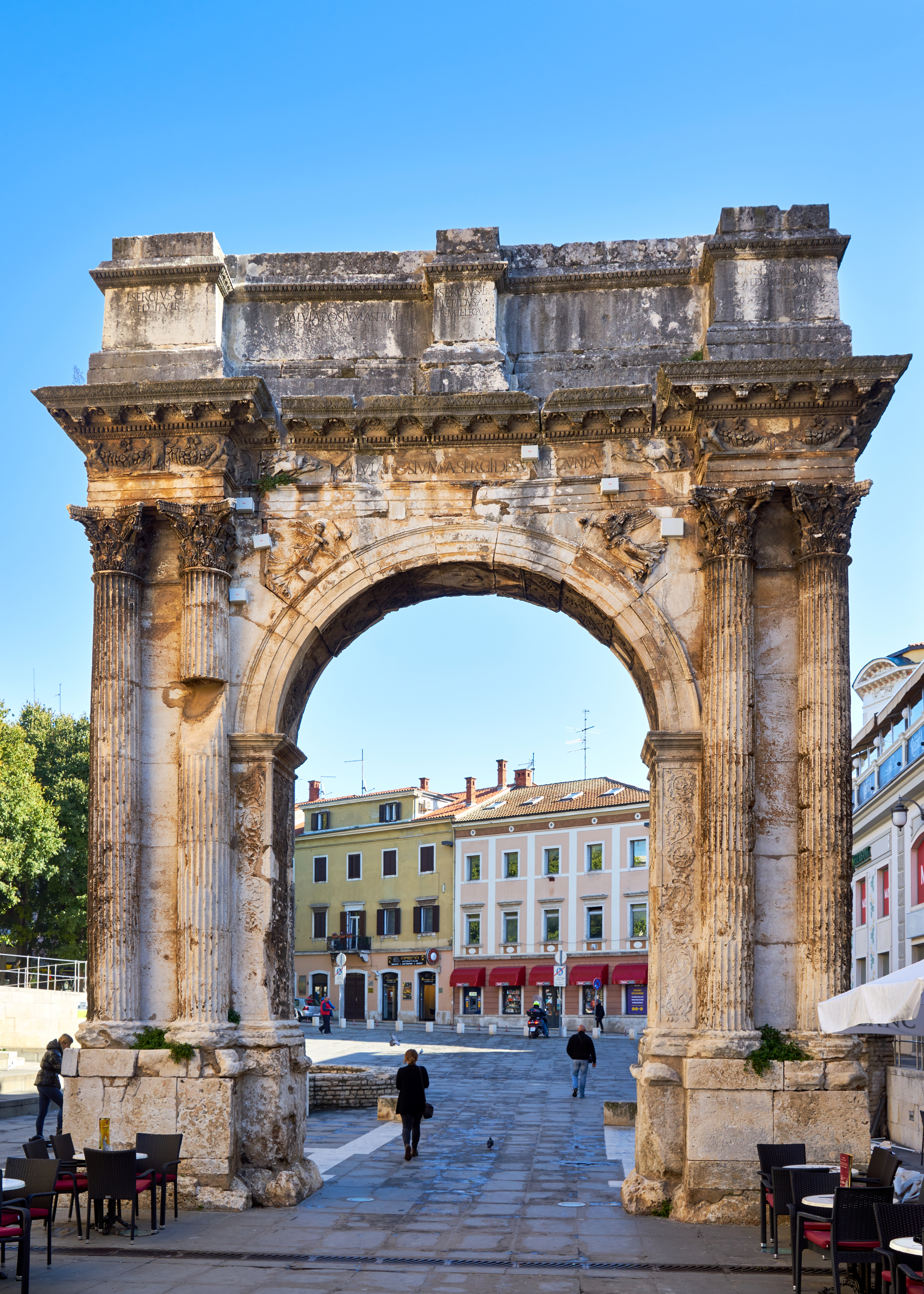
Arch of the Sergii in Pula

== Medieval Croatian art ==
=== Early Middle Ages ===
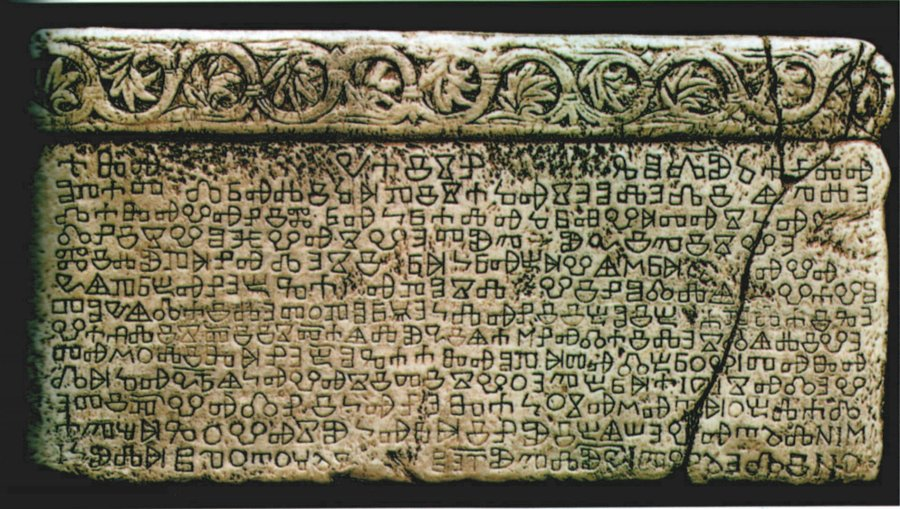
Baška tablet, the most famous glagolitic monument written with transversal type of glagolitic script from the 11th century. (Croatian Academy of Sciences and Arts)

In the 7th century the Croats, with other Slavs and Avars, came from Eastern Europe to the area of the former Roman provinces of Pannonia, Dalmatia and Istria where they live up to the present day. The Croats were an Iron Age nomadic culture, so avoiding the urban centres they instead settled in the countryside around the Roman cities, for example on an island in the river Jadro near Roman Salona.

Croatian dignitary, 11th century, Knin area

During the 7th and 8th centuries there was a trend of constructing smaller buildings from the material and decorative elements of ruined older Roman buildings. During the 9th century, parallel with the establishment of Croatian principalities, new architecture of pre-Romanesque characteristics emerged. It was based on numerous influences of which the Frankish and Byzantine were the strongest. Gradually those inherited influences evolved into a more original form of architecture. Altar screens and carved stone windows in those churches were decorated with the shallow interweaving ornamentation which we call Croatian interlace. In general, the appearance of interlace reliefs in a building indicates a date before 1100.

Motifs of this interlace are often of classical origin (waves, three-string interlace, pentagrams, net of rhomboids etc.), but while in Roman art it was only used as a frame, here it covers the entire surface. The sheer number and quality of these stone monuments indicates a rich masonry tradition with numerous masters and workshops on the east coast of the Adriatic. Croatian interlace was originally painted in bright colours of red, blue and yellow. Since the wall paintings that are mentioned in several literal sources (for example the portraits of the Trpimirović dynasty in the church of St. George in Putalj above Kaštel Sućurac) are not preserved, they are only type of pre-Romanesque Croatian painting.

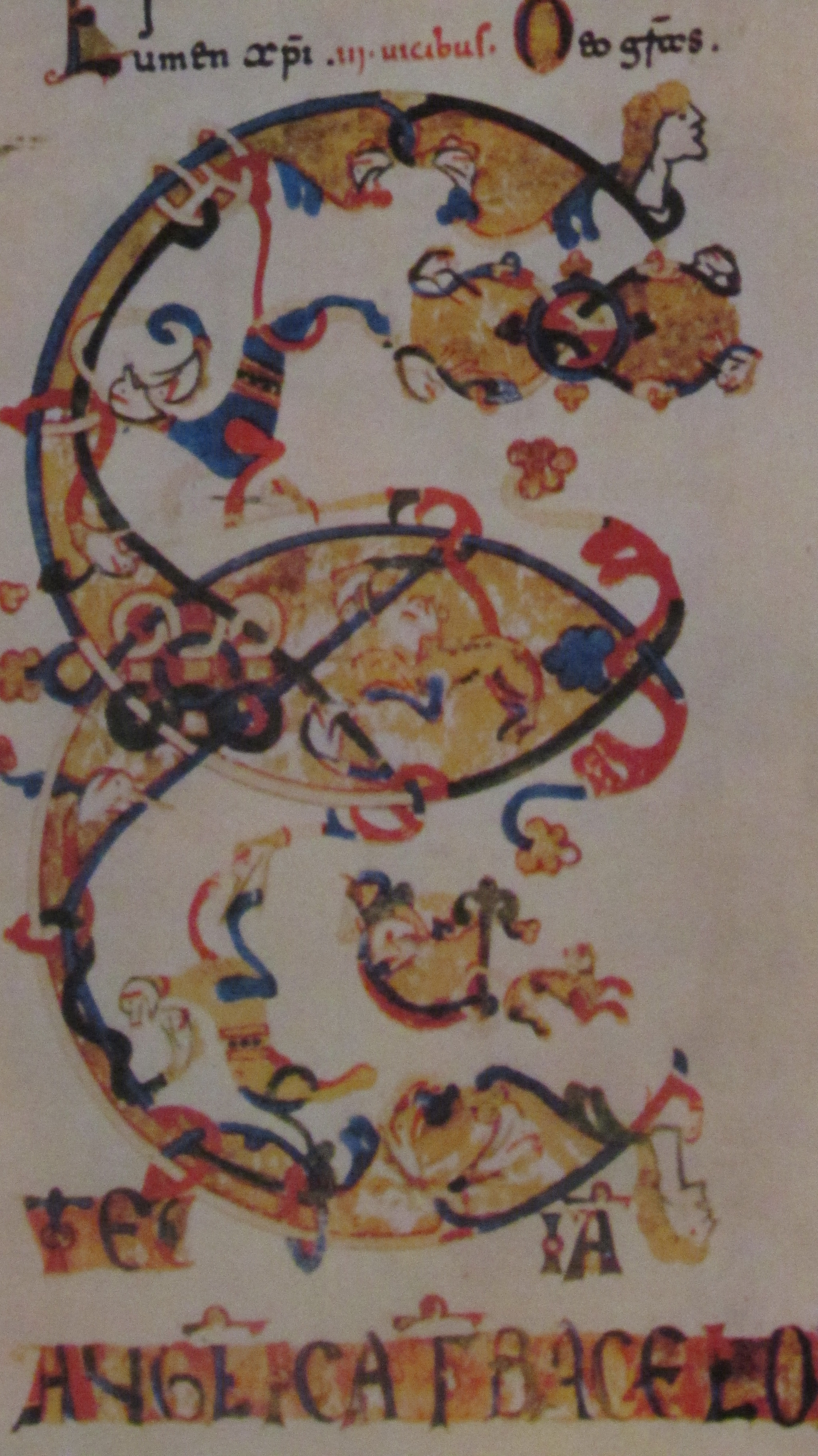
Illuminated page from abbess Vekenega's evangelistary, c. 1096

Sometimes the interlace was replaced by Biblical figures (as in the altar screen of the Sveta Nedjelja Church in Zadar), but the figures are flattened and depicted with stylized graphic lines. From Crown Church of King Zvonimir (so-called Hollow Church in Solin) comes the altar screen with the figure of the Croatian King on the throne with Carolingian crown, a servant by his side and a bowing subject. Linear cuts representing the folds of the robes are similar to the lines on their faces, and also on those on the frame. Today the board is a part of Split cathedral baptistery.

Out of the crafted objects of the time, many reliquaries are still preserved. Believed to have magical powers of healing, they were usually shaped for the body part they contained. That is why the relic of Saint James's head in Zadar is shaped like a head; the tube part has section with stream of arcades with single saint in every one, while a dome-like cover is decorated with medallions bearing symbols of evangelist and Christ on the top.

A significant number of church codices from this time have survived. In Zagreb there is a Liber psalmorum which was illuminated in Benedictine style by prior Majon for archbishop Paul of Split (c. 1015–1030). In the Vatican there is a Breviary, also in Monte Cassino Benedictine style (initials of intertwined leaves, interlace and animal heads) which originates from monastery of St. Nicola in Osor. The same style of illumination we can found in Breviars in Trogir, Šibenik and Dubrovnik but there are many that were recorded (like 47 books in only one church in monastery of St. Peter in Seka) but not preserved.

=== Romanesque art ===
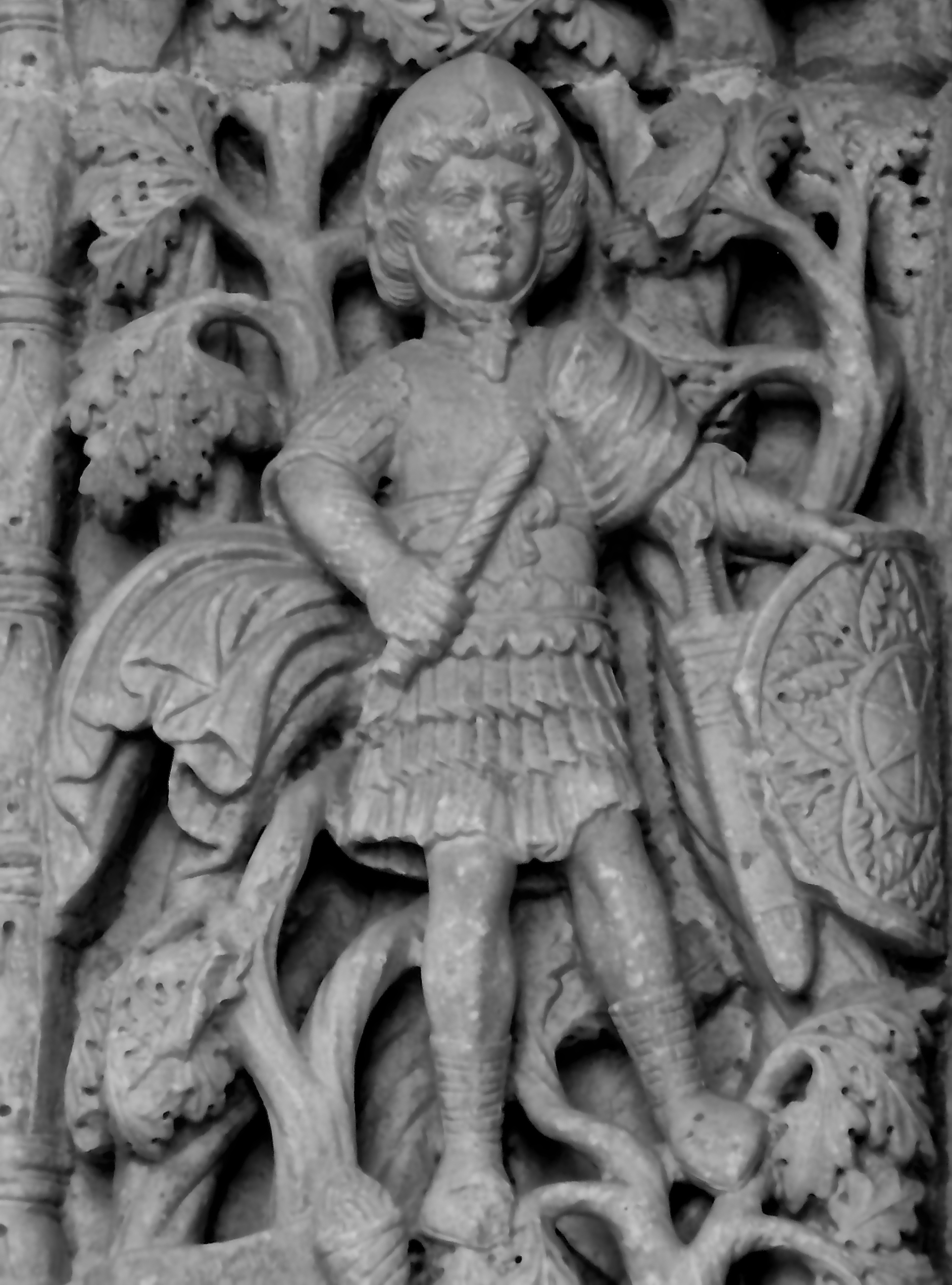
Trogir Cathedral: March is shown as a Roman soldier (the god Mars)

Early Romanesque art appeared in Croatia at the beginning of the 11th century with the introduction of monasteries and churches by the Benedictian order of Monte Cassino. Two important churches of the time are Church of St. Benedict (later St. Euphemia) in Split, and Church of St. Mary in Zadar, while St. Peter in Supetarska Draga on the island of Rab (11th century) is the best preserved church of the type in Croatia.

Many cathedrals can be found along the Croatian coast and nearby lands: in Istria, Dalmatia, and Primorje. Cities such as Poreč, Rab, Zadar, Trogir and Split were built along the Dalmatian coast with stone houses and large imposing churches with three naves, three apses, columns, arches, arcades and a wooden roof. Cathedrals were built in Senj, Krk, Rab, Zadar, Trogir, Dubrovnik and Zagreb.

In Croatian Romanesque sculpture, there was a move away from interlace to figurative reliefs (for example the reliefs in St Domenica’s in Zadar).

Two outstanding works of Romanesque sculpture date from the first half of the 13th century: the wooden entry doors of the Split cathedral by Andrija Buvina (1214) and the main portal of Trogir cathedral done by Master Radovan (c. 1240).

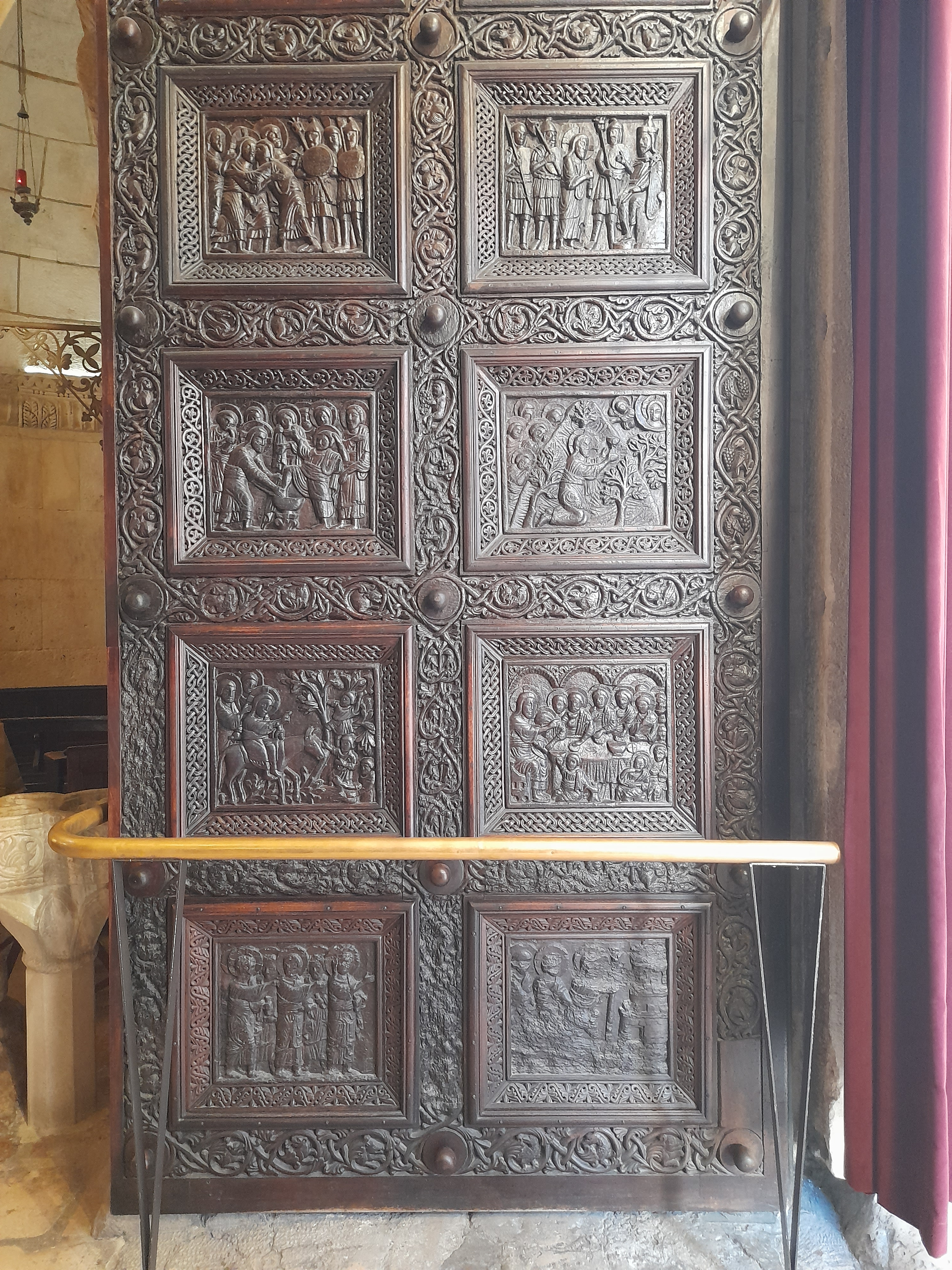
Carved wooden doors on the Cathedral of St. Duje, Split by Andrija Buvina

Carved wooden doors from the Romanesque period are relatively rare, as few of them have survived. Buvina’s huge double doors depict the life of Christ in 28 relief panels, each set within a double frame with interwoven vines and scrollwork ornamentation. The scenes are an original design, drawing their inspiration equally from the art of Western miniatures and Eastern Byzantine icons. The carving is precise and clean, leaving each scene easily understood. Also in Split cathedral, the carving on the wooden choir stalls dates to the mid-13th century, with beautiful Romanesque motifs of interwoven vines, figures of saints and a small bestiary. An early Gothic feature here is the introduction of a woodcarver at work, possibly a self-portrait.

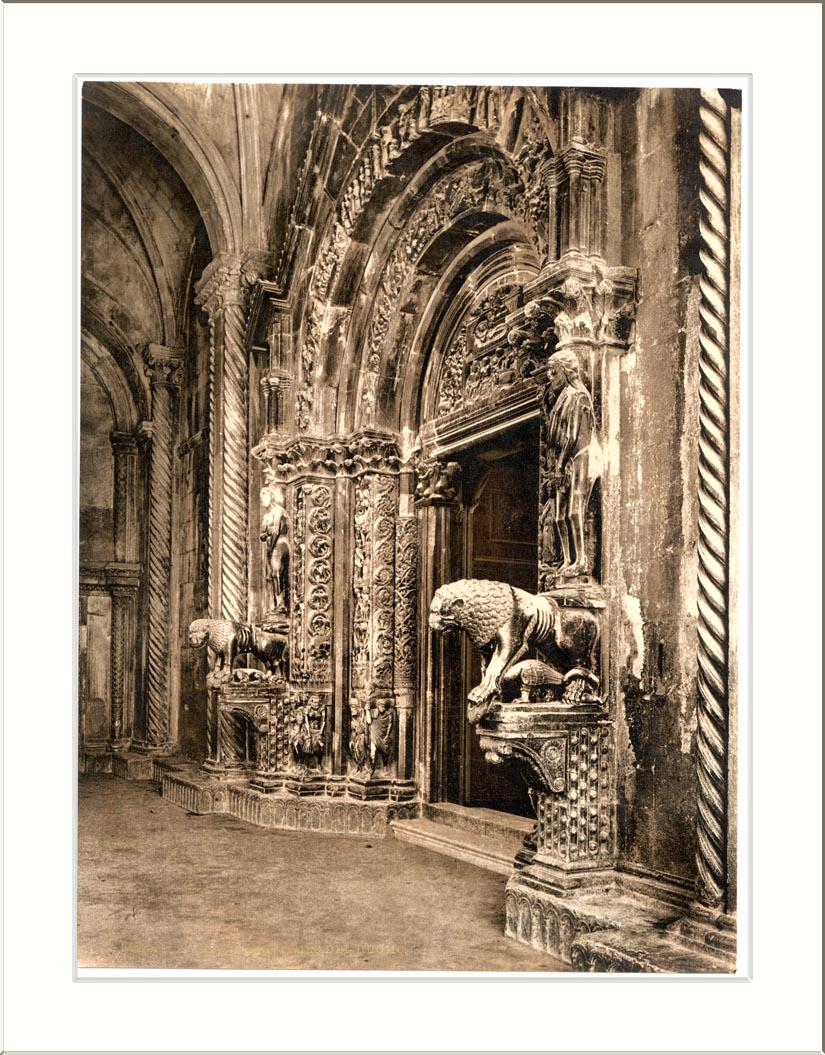
Trogir Cathedral, Master Radovan's portal

Although the main portal of Trogir cathedral was not completed until the 14th century, it is clearly Romanesque in form, but with a new Gothic humanist tendency in the carvings. The date for the portal is generally given as 1240, which is when Master Radovan carved his name as part of the latin inscription. The portal has a semi-circular tympanum set within a recessed frame with rounded arches in the Romanesque style. The large main figures are sculptures of Adam and Eve, borne on lions supported by plinths. Scenes from the life of Christ from the Annunciation to the Resurrection appear in the arches above the door, with the Nativity occupying the central position of the tympanum, which was unusual for the time. It is a reflection of the spirit of the new Gothic age to replace the dire warning of the Last Judgement above the doorway, with a message of love and hope.

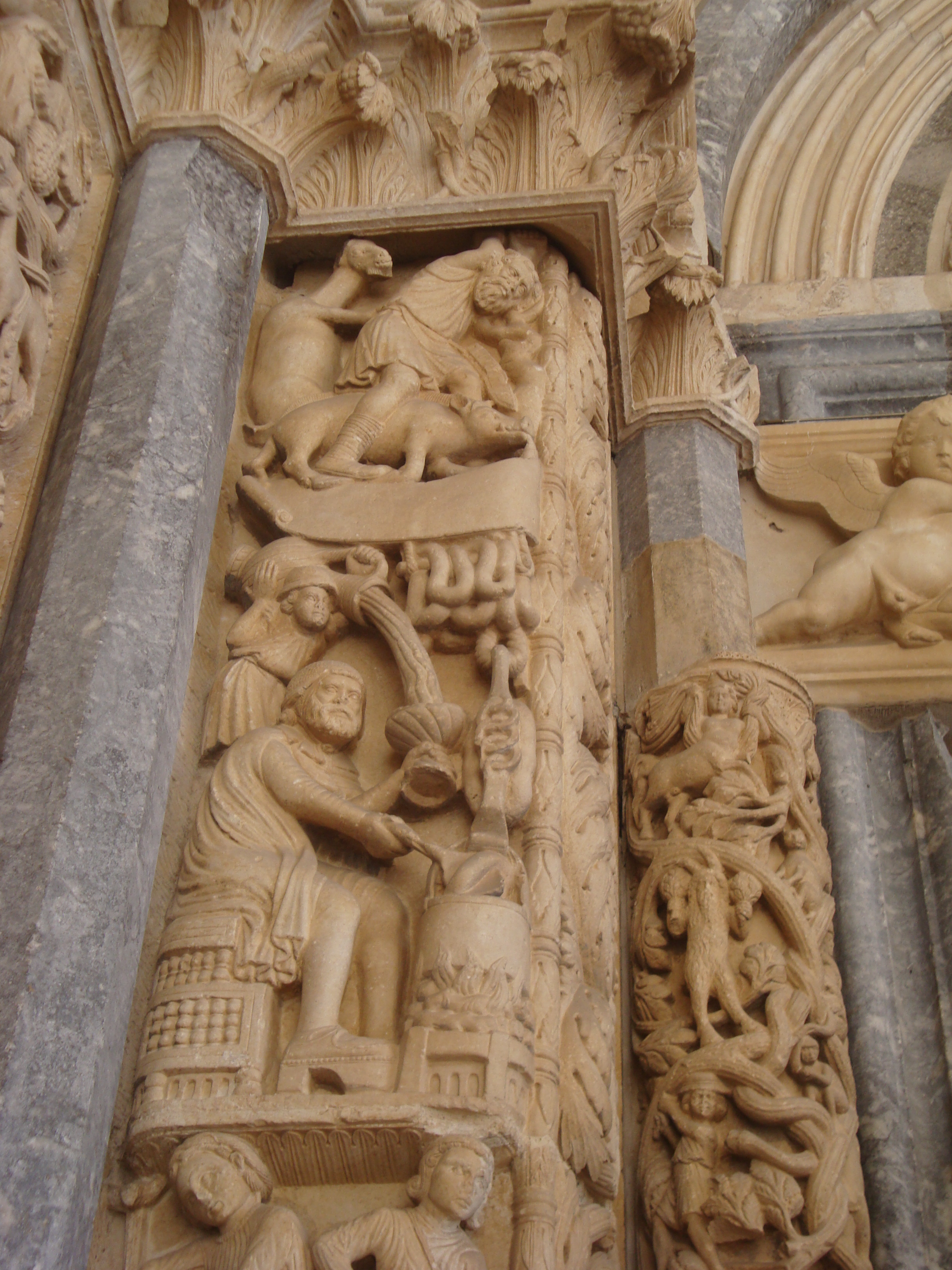
Radovan: scenes of everyday life butchering the pig (above) and making sausages

Down both sides of the portal is a sequence of reliefs representing the months of the year. The figures here are particularly animated, and the scenes are taken from contemporary life. For example, December is shown as the month to butcher the pig and make sausages, followed by January where an old man sits by the fireside cooking, while a young man pours wine from an amphora in a reference to Aquarius the water carrier. The realism of such scenes, and the representation of everyday life of the people is a move to Gothic ideas, with its focus on contemporary humanist issues and real characters.

Paintings in Croatia from this time include frescoes, paintings on wood panels and illuminated manuscripts. The early Romanesque frescoes in St Michael in Ston date to the 11th/12th century, and are related to the Benedictine Abbey of St Michael on Monte Gargano. Sadly only fragments of the Ston frescoes still survive, a series of biblical figures, portrayed full-face, dressed in richly ornamented robes. In typical early Romanesque style, the figures are static, described with lines, without much depth or form in the background. The Zadar Benedictine church has 12th century frescoes in a similar style, but not so brightly coloured and less linear. Meanwhile in Istria, there are different fresco styles and influences to be seen from the 12th century. The western Ottonian style of art (St Michael int Kloštar at Lim Bay), Byzantine Comnenian style from the Aquileia workshop (St Jerome’s church in Hum), and a combination of both western and Byzantine styles (St. Foška at Batvači near Peroj).

Paintings of the time on wood were generally icons of the Virgin Mary with Child or of the Crucifixion. There are six surviving Romanesque Virgin with Child icons in Croatia, the oldest of which is the Madonna from Saint Sylvester’s Church on the island of Biševo (1220), now in Hvar Cathedral The figures of mother and child are Byzantine in style, combined with a typical Romanesque use of line and colour. Two painted crucifixes from the Franciscan Abbey in Zadar are even older, as are some early Romanesque crucifixes from Istrian churches.

Although the oldest illuminated miniature in Croatia dates from the 8th century, they are extremely rare until the 11th century. Examples from around that time include the Šibenik Sacramentary and Evangelistary written in Carolingian minuscule, and fragments of a Evangelistary from Rab written in Beneventana. The illuminations in these manuscripts are just simple initials with scrolls and animal heads, but by the 13th century, manuscripts from Trogir, Split and Zagreb contain much more complex illustrations, including entire Biblical scenes taking up most of a page.

=== Gothic art ===
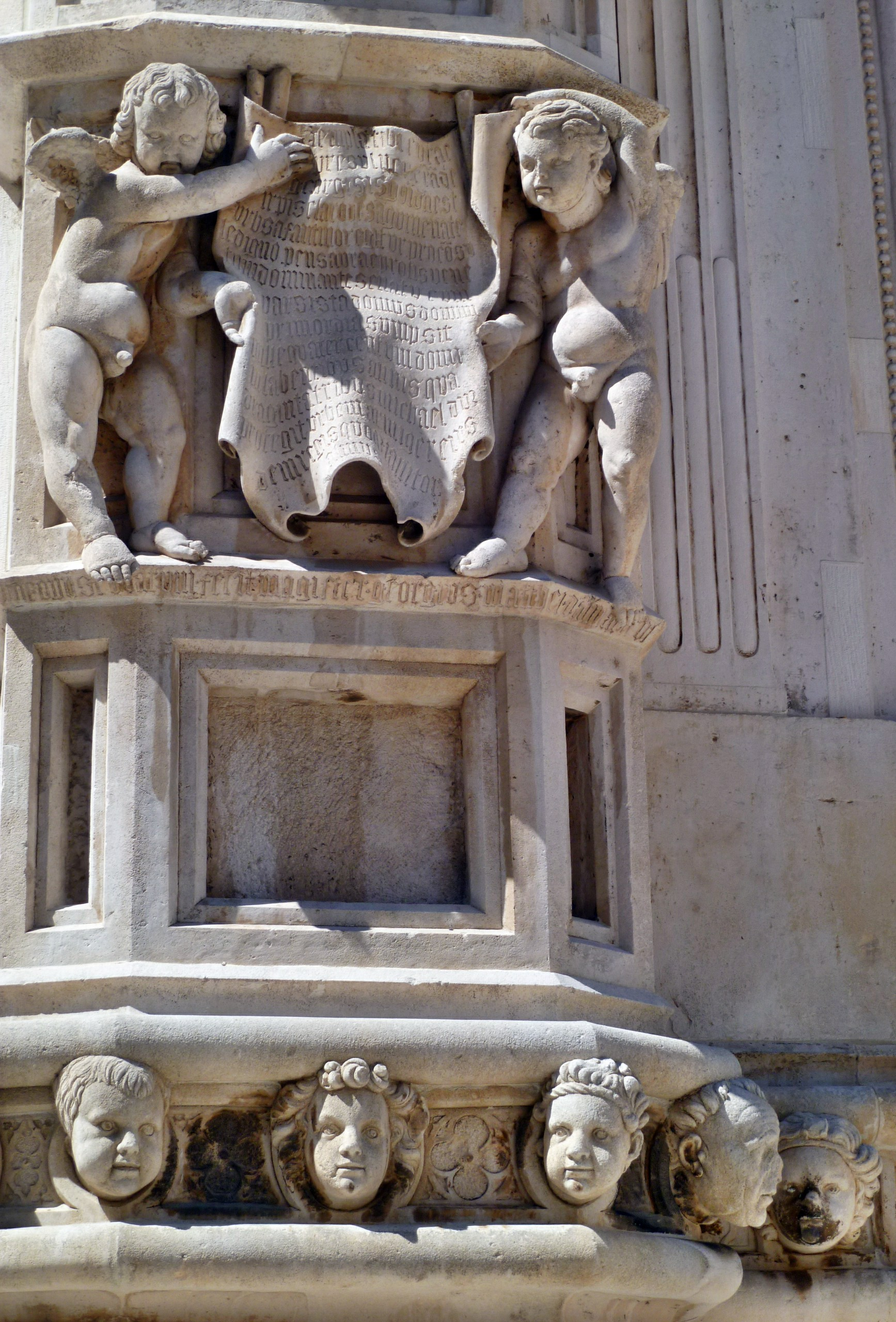
Decorative carvings by Juraj Dalmatinac on Šibenik Cathedral are a successful fusion of gothic and renaissance styles

Gothic art in the 14th century was supported by a culture of city councils, religious orders (such as the Franciscans), and the nobility. It was the golden age of free Dalmatian cities that were trading with Croatian feudal nobility in the continent. Urban organization and evolution of Dalmatian cities can be followed through the continued development and expansion of Rab and Trogir, the regulation of streets in Dubrovnik, and the integration of Split.

At the end of the 15th century, the majority of the coastal region was administered by Venice, and churches, palaces, cloisters, loggias, clock towers and fountains began to appear, which were influenced by Venetian Gothic: not just in structure and construction, but on the emphasis of decorative elements. The master of the Gothic style was Juraj Dalmatinac (George of Dalmatia), builder of Šibenik Cathedral. The form and the decorative elements of the Cathedral, such as a remarkable frieze decorated with 71 sculptured faces of men, women, and children, illustrates the successful fusion of Gothic and Renaissance art. The cathedral also shows the considerable interchange of art and architecture knowledge between Northern Italy, Dalmatia and Tuscany in the 15th and 16th centuries. Juraj Dalmatinac also worked in Split (Chapel of St. Anastasius in the Cathedral), Dubrovnik, Zadar and Ancona, while his followers spread the Venetian Gothic style throughout the whole of Dalmatia.

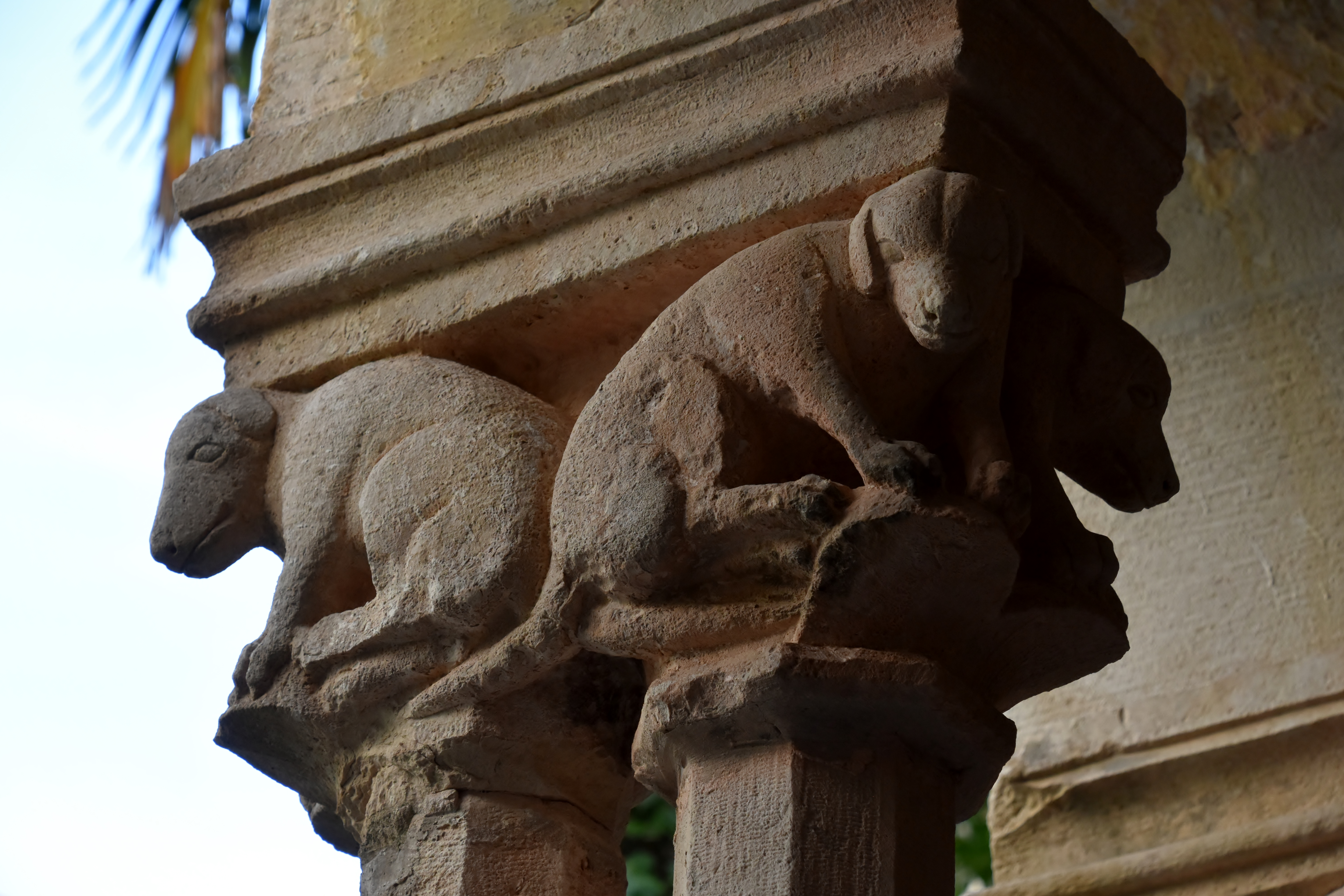
Franciscan Monastery, Dubrovnik, 14th century cloister animal carvings

The Franciscan friary, Dubrovnik was built by Mihoje Brajkov of Bar in 1360. Much of the original building was destroyed in the earthquake of 1667, but the cloisters and the carved church portal remain. The lower cloister was built in Romanesque/Gothic style where the capitals are constructed in Romanesque form, but the carvings on them are lively creatures modelled with a Gothic realism. The portal was sculpted in 1498 in Gothic style by the workshop of the brothers Leonard and Petar Petroviċ. The almost life-sized Pietà in the central lunette is flanked by the figures of St. Jerome (holding a model of the pre-earthquake church) and St. John the Baptist. On top of the lunette stands the figure of the Father Creator. Also in Dubrovnik, the old Rector’s Palace (1435) was built in Gothic style by Onofrio della Cava, who was also responsible for two fountains, which are still in use today.

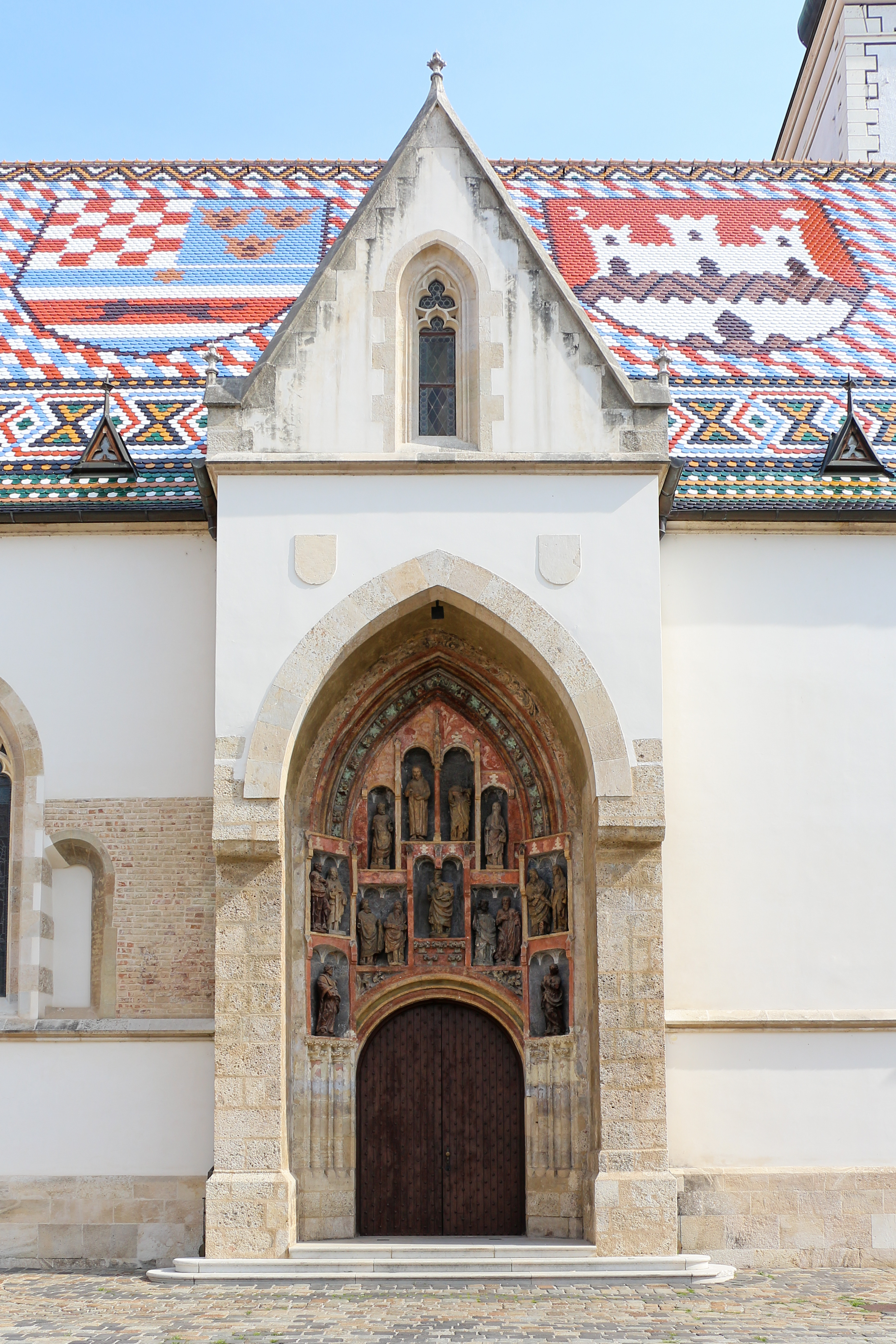
Portal of St. Mark's Church, Zagreb with gothic statues

The Church of St Mark in Zagreb was radically reconstructed in the second half of the 14th century in Late Gothic style. The main portal contains a series of carved figures of St Mark, Christ, Madonna and the twelve apostles. On top are the statues of Joseph and Mary with the infant Jesus, and below them stand St. Mark and the Lion. The twelve Apostles are placed on both sides of the portal (four wooden statues have replaced original ones which were destroyed). Originally the entire portal was painted in vivid colours. The portal is considered to be the work of sculptors of the Parler family from Prague (end of the 14th century).

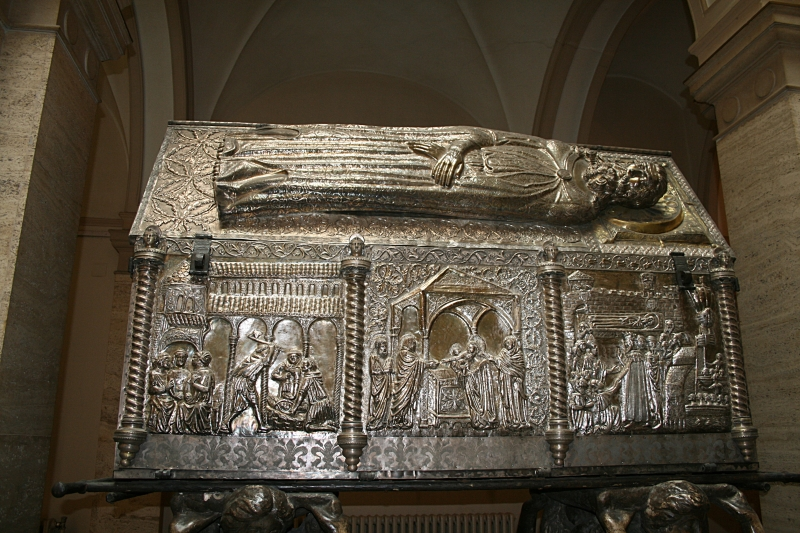
Chest of Saint Simeon (1380), Zadar by Francesco Milano

One of the most outstanding works of art from the 14th century in Dalmatia is the large silver chest made for the relics of St. Simeon, with a portrait of the saint himself on the lid. The chest is covered with relief scenes, of which only one (the Presentation in the Temple) is biblical. The St Simeon reliquary crosses the boundary between the western Gothic style and Byzantine.

Some outstanding Gothic frescoes are still preserved in churches across Istria. The small cemetery church of St. Nicholas in Rakotule contains some early examples of Venetian origin. Scenes from St Nicholas’ life are depicted in a range of colours and shades, using firm strokes to denote character and volume. The figures are active, and their faces have distinctive features, while details of the background are clearly taken from contemporary life.

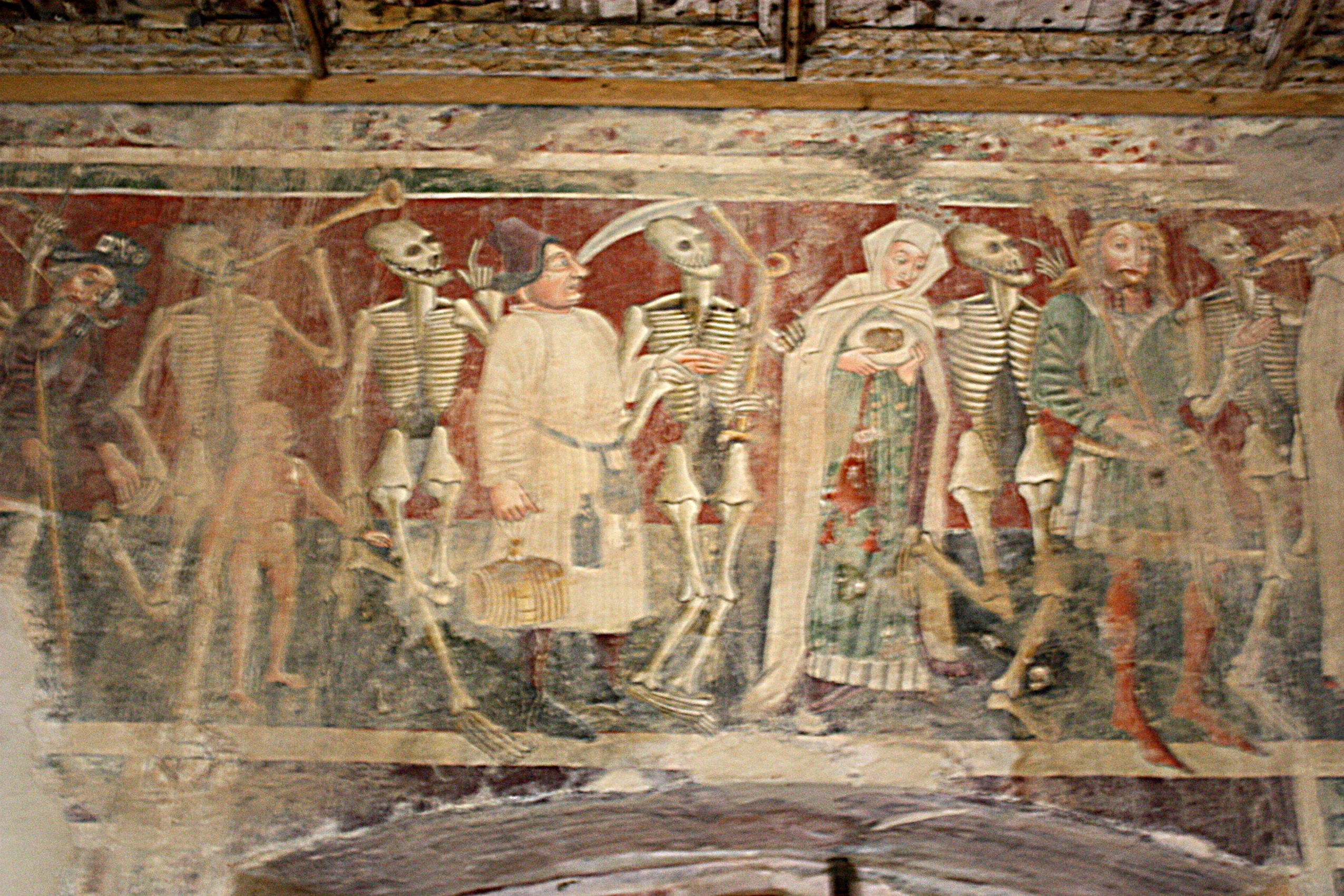
Danse Macabre in Church of St Mary on the Rocks, Beram

Possibly the best-known series of late Gothic frescoes in Istria is in the Church of St Mary on the Rocks (Sv Marija na Škriljinah) near Beram, dating from 1474. Painted by Vincent of Kastav, the frescoes cover the entire interior of the church in a series of 46 panels. The largest composition (8m long) is The Adoration of the Magi, high on the northern wall. The figures appear three-dimensional, within the illusion of space. Across the back wall, the cycle of life panels conclude with the Danse Macabre (Dance of Death), in which everyone meets their fate - rich or poor, all must die in the end. Scenes of this typically gothic humanist theme were painted in many places across Europe at the time, although not all have survived to this extent. The frescoes of St Marys in Beram remain largely as originally painted, and are amongst the finest works of medieval art in Istria

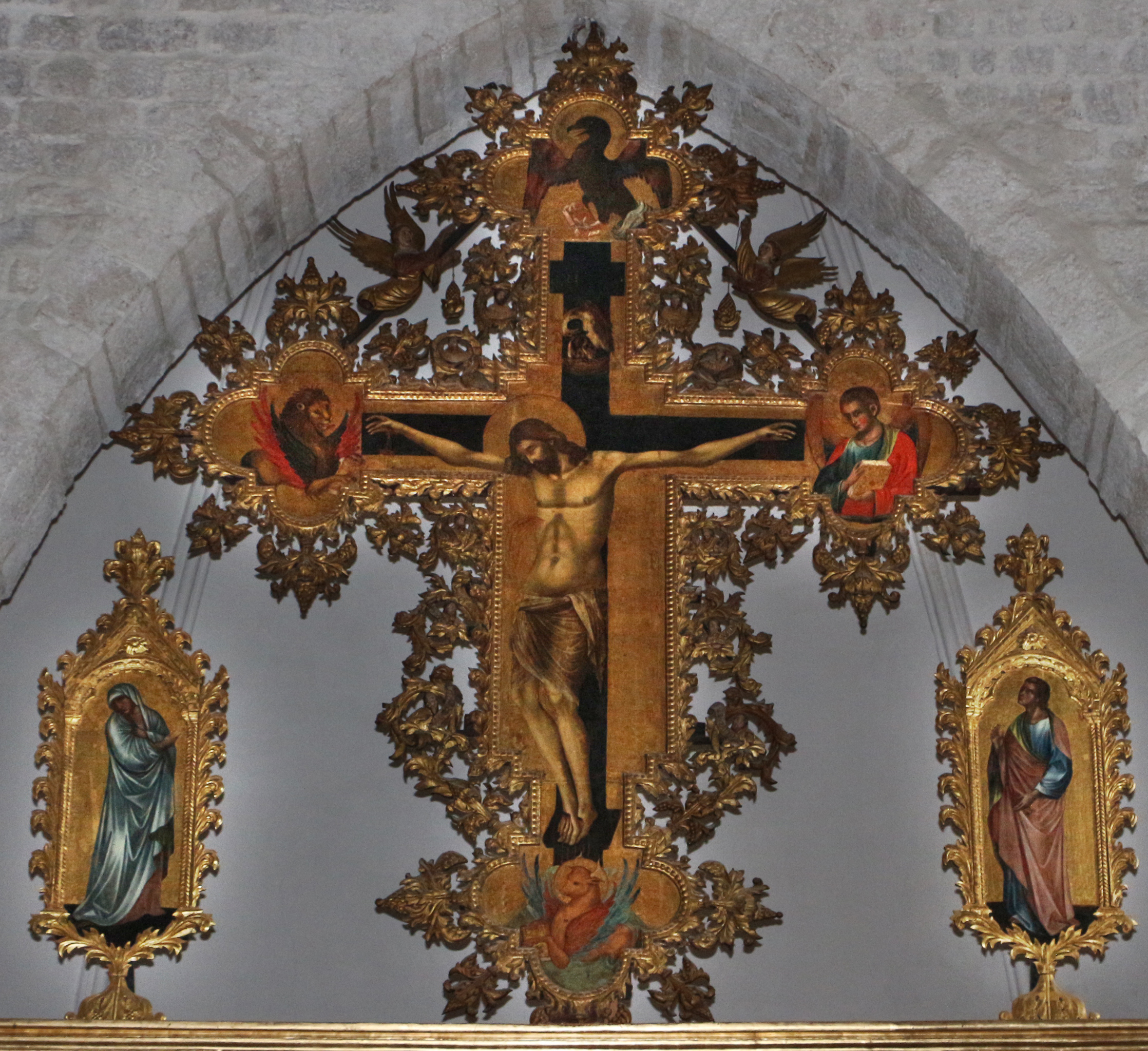
Paolo Veneziano, Crucifixion, 1350c Dominican Church, Dubrovnik

A series of paintings of exceptional quality on wood are reliably attributed to Paolo Veneziano one of the best-known painters in the Venetian Republic. His work brings a Gothic element to Byzantine iconography, using long elegant figures and subtle colours in his signature style. His works in Croatia include polyptychs (composite altarpieces), paintings in Zadar and Trogir, and the large Crucifixion in the Dominican church in Dubrovnik, which includes separate panels for the Virgin Mary and St John.

One distinctive feature of paintings by local artists from coastal Croatia is a red background in place of the costlier gold. The red brings an appropriate warmth to the Gothic style paintings, as the gold would also have had a red under-painting. One such example is the Crucifixion in the monastery church at Tkon (island of Pašman). There were two trends for paintings on wood in Croatia during the 14th century: one continued with strict linearity to depict volume, while the other used colour to create a more subtle form. In the painting “Mother of God with Child and Donor” in Zadar, the donor himself is shown. As in other European icons of the time, the donor is small. This is an early representation of secular human figures in a religious painting. Such figures were to increase in size, until the human figures achieved their own importance in the Renaissance portrait of the 15th century. Zadar was an important centre for Gothic culture (and painting in particular), which emanated and spread to other Dalmatian communities.

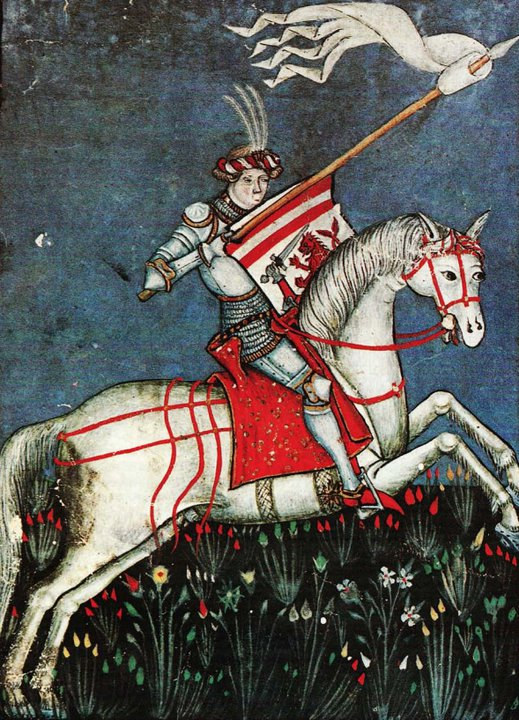
Illumination from Hrvoje's Missal written in Split, 1404.

From that time come two of the best and most finely decorated illuminated liturgies done by monks from Split, – Hvals' Zbornik (today in Zagreb), and Hrvoje's Missal (now in Istanbul). The Missal was written in Split by the resident calligrapher and glagolitic scribe, Butko, in 1404 for Hrvoje Vukčić Hrvatinić, Ban (Viceroy) of Bosnia and Duke of Split. The miniatures are believed to have been painted by a local artist and were done around 1407 in Split, as contemporary events and scenery have been incorporated into the illustrations. Amidst the biblical scenes and allegories are two full-sheet paintings with a non-religious subject – the Duke himself as a chivalric knight on horseback, and his coat of arms. Hrvoje's Missal is an important document both for the Glagolithic script and for the introduction of portraiture into what is essentially a religious book.

== Renaissance ==
The Renaissance period of art and architecture in Croatia can be said to begin in 1441, when Juraj Dalmatinac was contracted to work on Šibenik Cathedral, and continued to the end of the 16th century. At the time, much of the Croatian coast was administered by the Venetian Republic, and there was a thriving interchange of ideas and skills between Italy and the eastern Adriatic, particularly Dalmatia. As the interior of Croatia came under Austrian Hapsburg rule, and increasingly suffered invasion by the Ottomans, the focus was more on fortifications, less on artwork. Under these circumstances, the Italian Renaissance only flourished in coastal Croatia with significant new religious and public architecture in Dalmatia clearly influenced by the new style, but in an original way. Three important works from that period contributed to further development of the Renaissance: Šibenik Cathedral, the Chapel of Blessed John in Trogir Cathedral, and Sorkočević's villa in Dubrovnik.

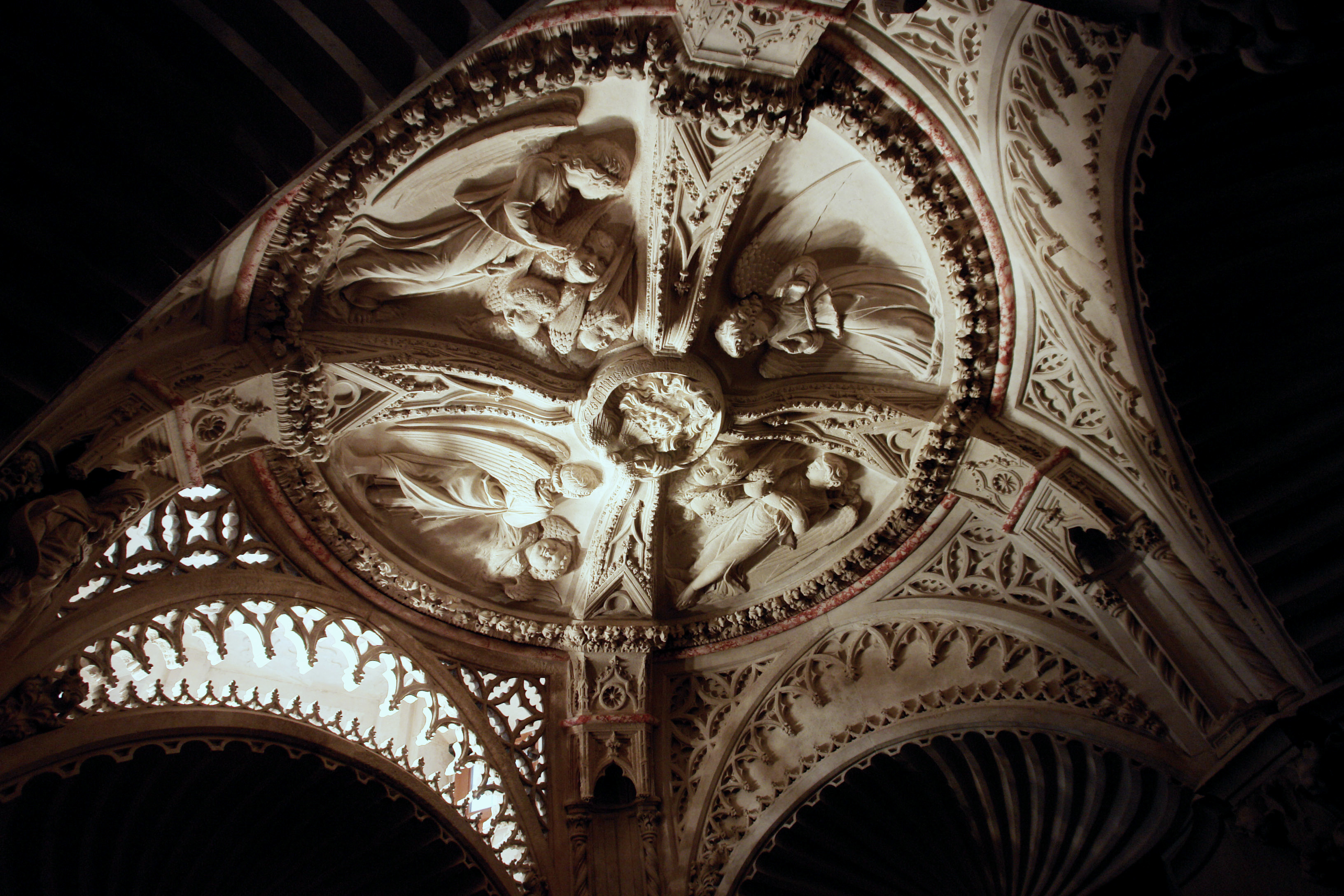
Šibenik Cathedral baptistery ceiling by Juraj Dalmatinac

As Juraj Dalmatinac took over responsibility for the building of Šibenik Cathedral, among his first works was in the baptistry, where he introduced elements inspired by Brunelleschi and Donatello. The soft modelling on the carved figures and the flowing movement are clearly Renaissance, as are the proportions of the baptistry itself. The reliefs on the ceiling show God the Father with a very Renaissance laurel wreath, surrounded by angels and seraphim, and an infant being baptized by a priest. This substitution of human figures in place of Christ and John the Baptist in the Jordan is a reflection of the new humanist trend. These elements are creatively combined with Gothic features for a harmonious overall effect. As mentioned in the previous section, Juraj Dalmatinac is considered a master of blending Gothic with Renaissance. His successors on the Šibenik project were Andrija Aleši, one of his students, and Nikola Firentinac, who was responsible for completing the cathedral according to Juraj’s original plans.

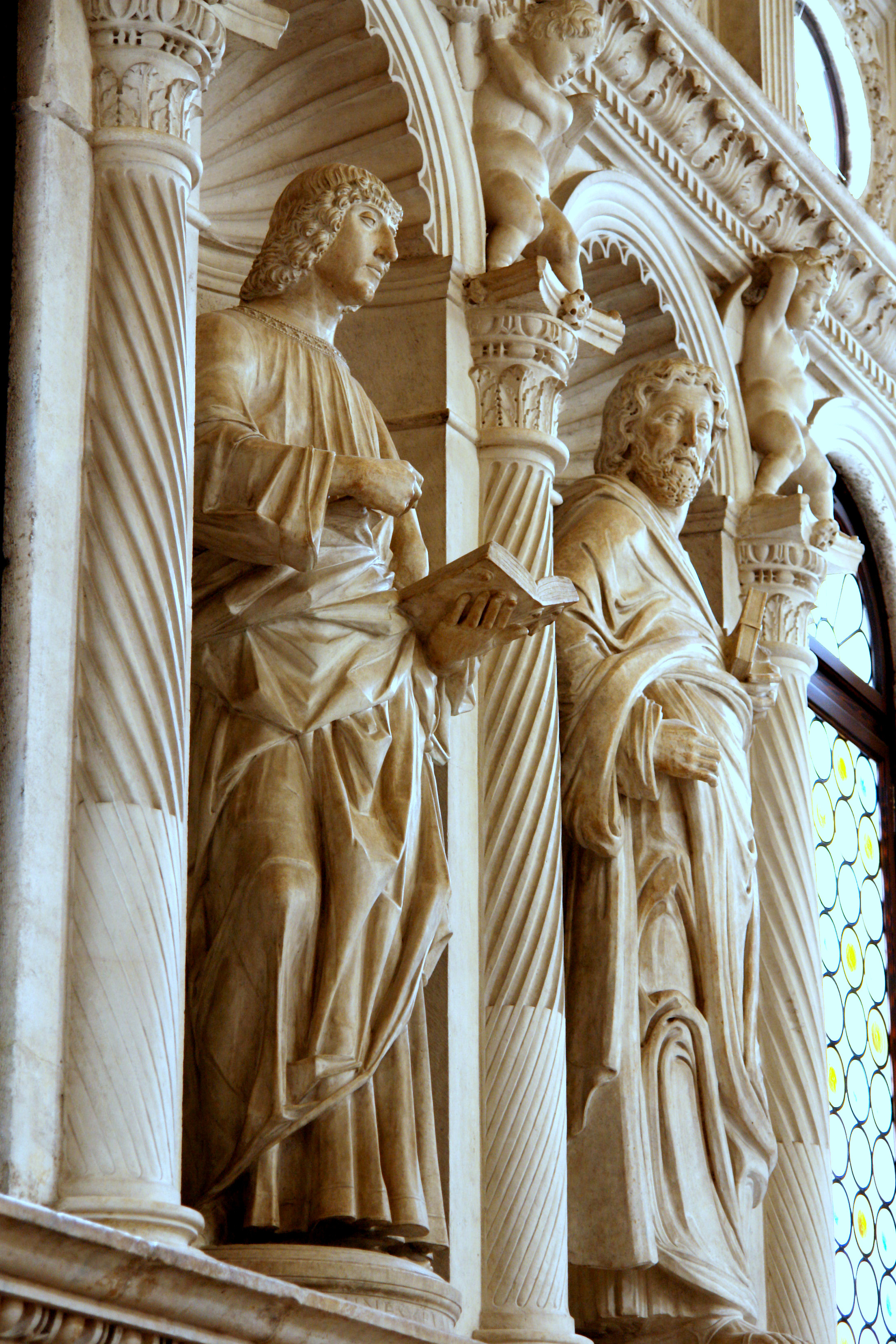
Chapel of the Blessed Giovanni Orsini, Trogir cathedral. St John the Evangelist by Ivan Duknović (left), St James by Nikola Firentinac (right)

In 1468, construction began on the expansion of the Chapel of the Blessed John of Trogir in Trogir Cathedral. The three principal sculptors were Nikola Firentinac, Andrija Aleši and Ivan Duknović. The chapel has a barrel vault with God and angels’ faces, below which is a row of circular windows and three tiers of carved figures surrounding the shrine. The quality of the sculptures of Christ, Mary and the apostles in their individual niches, with reliefs of playful putti above and below make the chapel a memorable example of Renaissance art. Among the finest statues are Duknović's John the Evangelist, and Firentinac’s St Paul. The Gothic sarcophagus and Baroque angels are a later addition.

Inside the protective walls of the Republic of Dubrovnik, and on several of the nearby islands, many Ragusan nobles built their country retreats, elegant villas set in renaissance gardens. These were not as ornate as their Italian counterparts, but made good use of the terrain with its seaside location and plentiful supply of stone. A fine example is Sorkočević's villa on the island of Lapad near Dubrovnik. Built in 1521, with an unusual asymmetrical design, the house and garden are preserved in their original form.

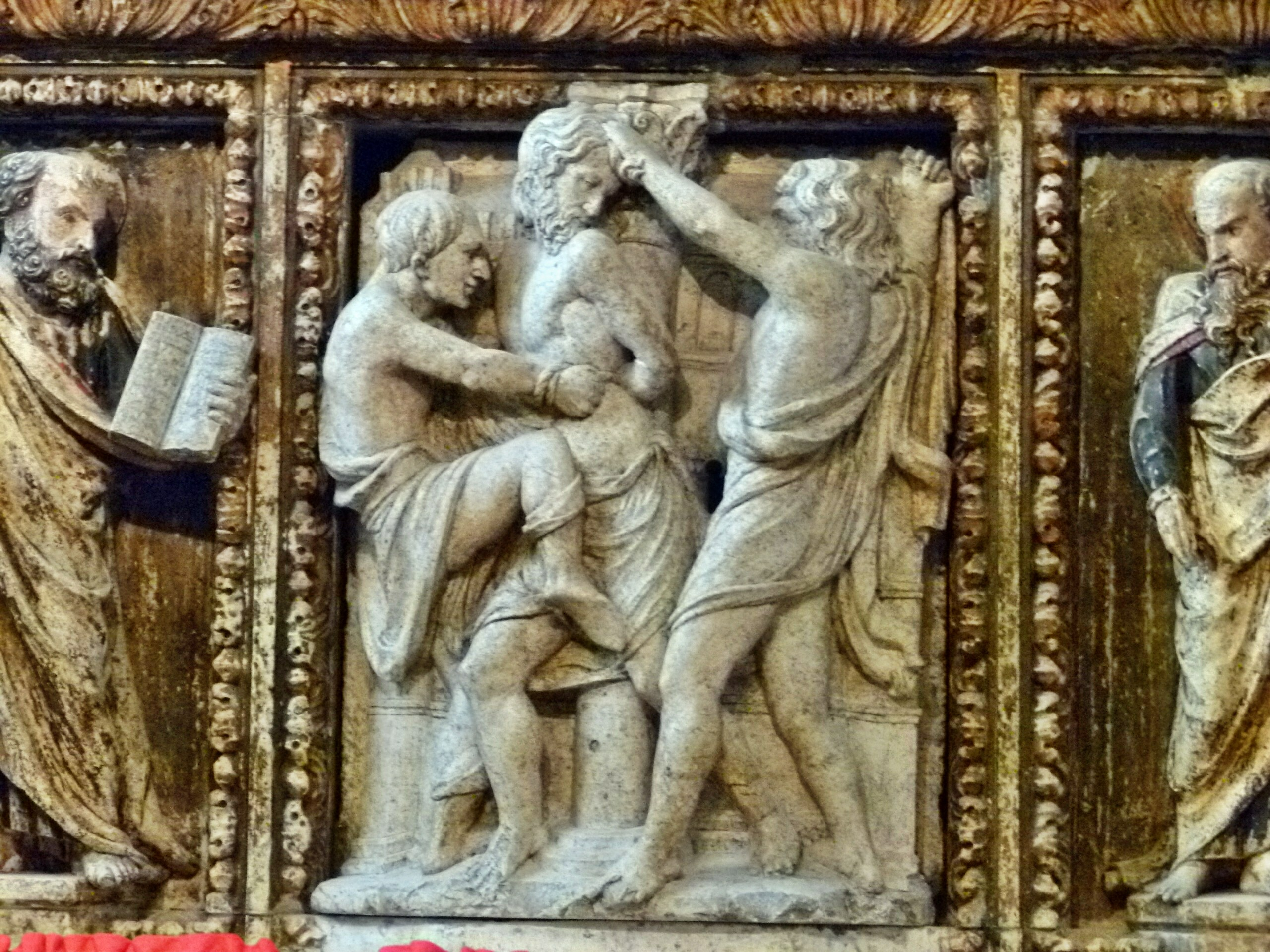
Flagellation of Christ (1428) by Juraj Dalmatinac, Split Cathedral

One of the most beautiful Renaissance sculptures in Croatia is perhaps the relief of the Flagellation of Christ by Juraj Dalmatinac on the altar of St Anastasius in Split cathedral. In contrast to the static carving on the altar opposite, three almost naked figures are caught in dynamic movement.

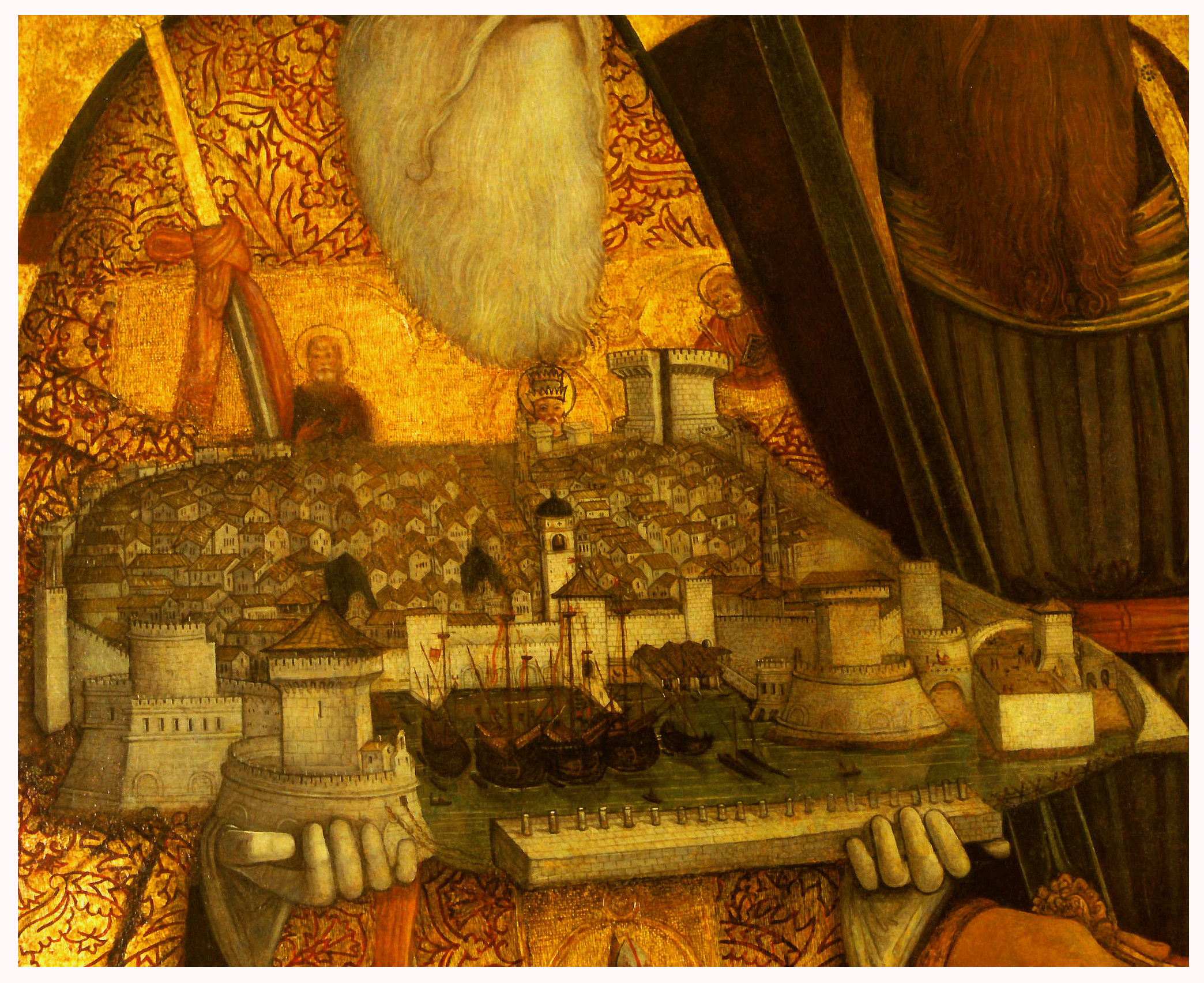
Model of Dubrovnik held by Saint Blaise in this detail from a triptych by Nikola Božidarević

During the 15th and 16th centuries, art flourished in Dubrovnik’s religious institutions, public buildings and its many patrician residences. Although a great deal of the work was commissioned from well-known artists from Italy, much of it was done by locally-born artists. The preferred style of church paintings in Dubrovnik, even into the renaissance period, was still framed in the form of a triptych, or polyptych. But within that structure, new ideas and designs were introduced, such as portraits depicting real characters, linear perspective, and even some still lifes. The artists of the Dubrovnik Painting School, such as Nikola Božidarević, Lovro Dobričević and his son Vicko Lovrin, Mihajlo Hamzić, Blaž Jurijev Trogiranin and Ivan Ugrinović, began a tradition of art in the city that continues to the present. Sadly, much of Dubrovnik’s beautiful Romanesque and Renaissance artwork was destroyed in the earthquake of 1667 and the resulting fires, and most of it we know only from documents in the Dubrovnik State Archives.

One Croatian artist who worked mainly in northern Italy was Giorgio Schiavone (or Juraj Ćulinović), who was born in Skradin in Dalmatia and went on to work with Francesco Squarcione in Padua. Today, his paintings are held by several prestigious galleries worldwide, and he is considered the most important Croatian painter of the 15th century. Other famous Croatian-born Renaissance artists that lived and worked abroad, were the Laurana brothers, Francesco (Franjo Vranjanin) and Luciano (Luka Vranjanin), the miniaturist Giulio Clovio (Juraj Klović), engraver and portrait painter Martin Rota (Martin Kalunić-Rota) and mannerist painter Andrea Schiavone (Andrija Medulić).

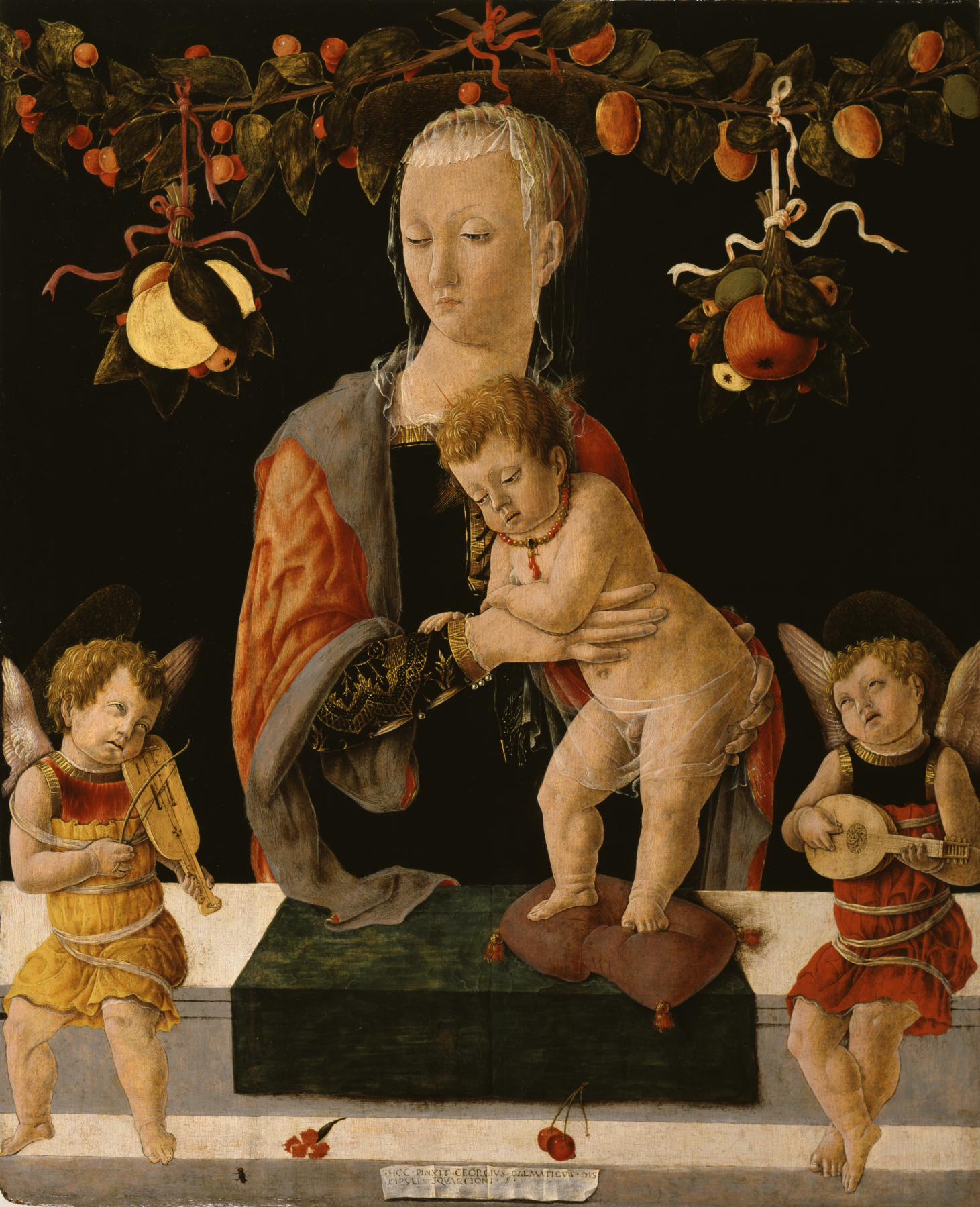
Madonna and Child, by Giorgio Schiavone, (c. 1459-1460), Walters Art Museum

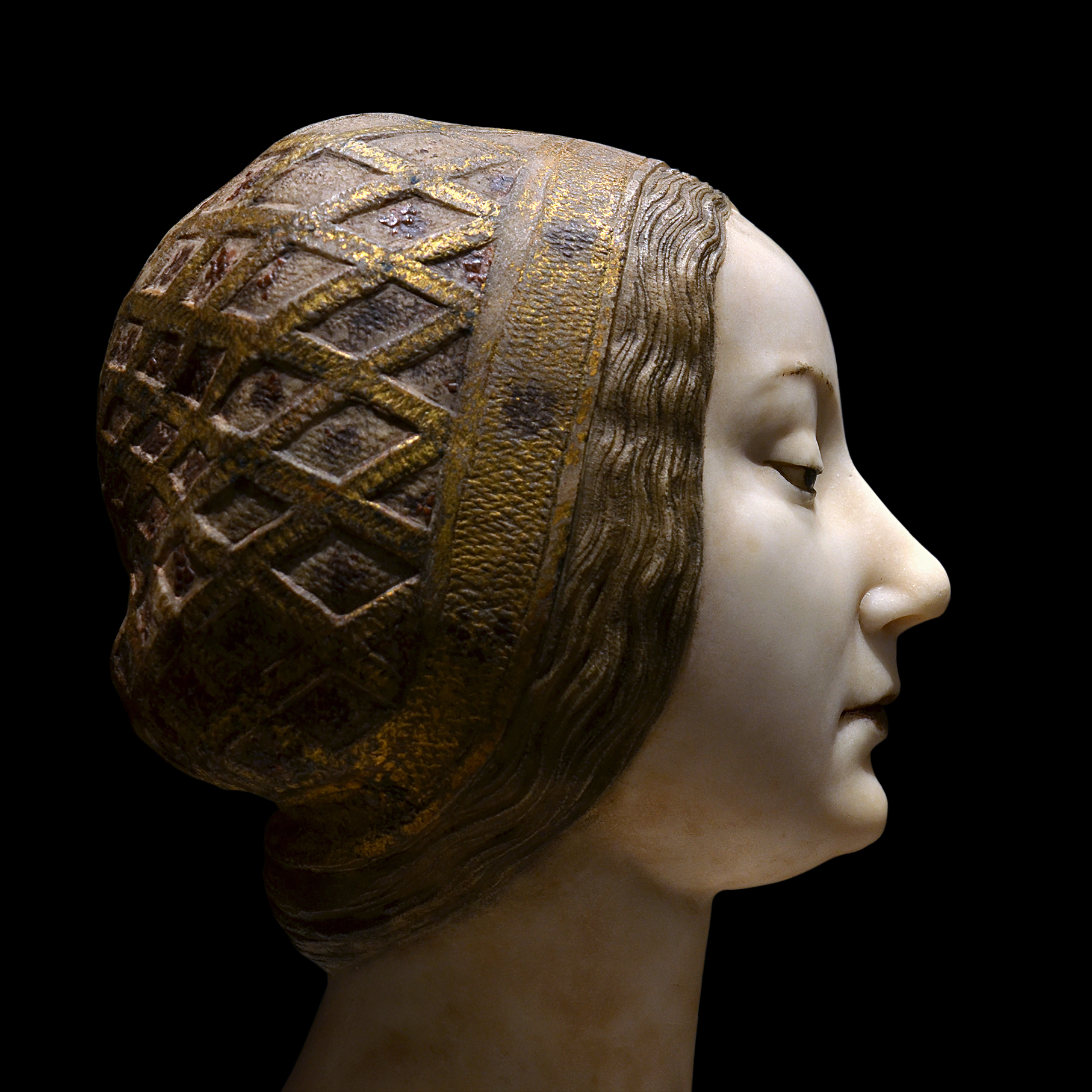
Bust of Isabella of Aragon by Francesco Laurana, (c. 1472) Kunsthistorisches Museum

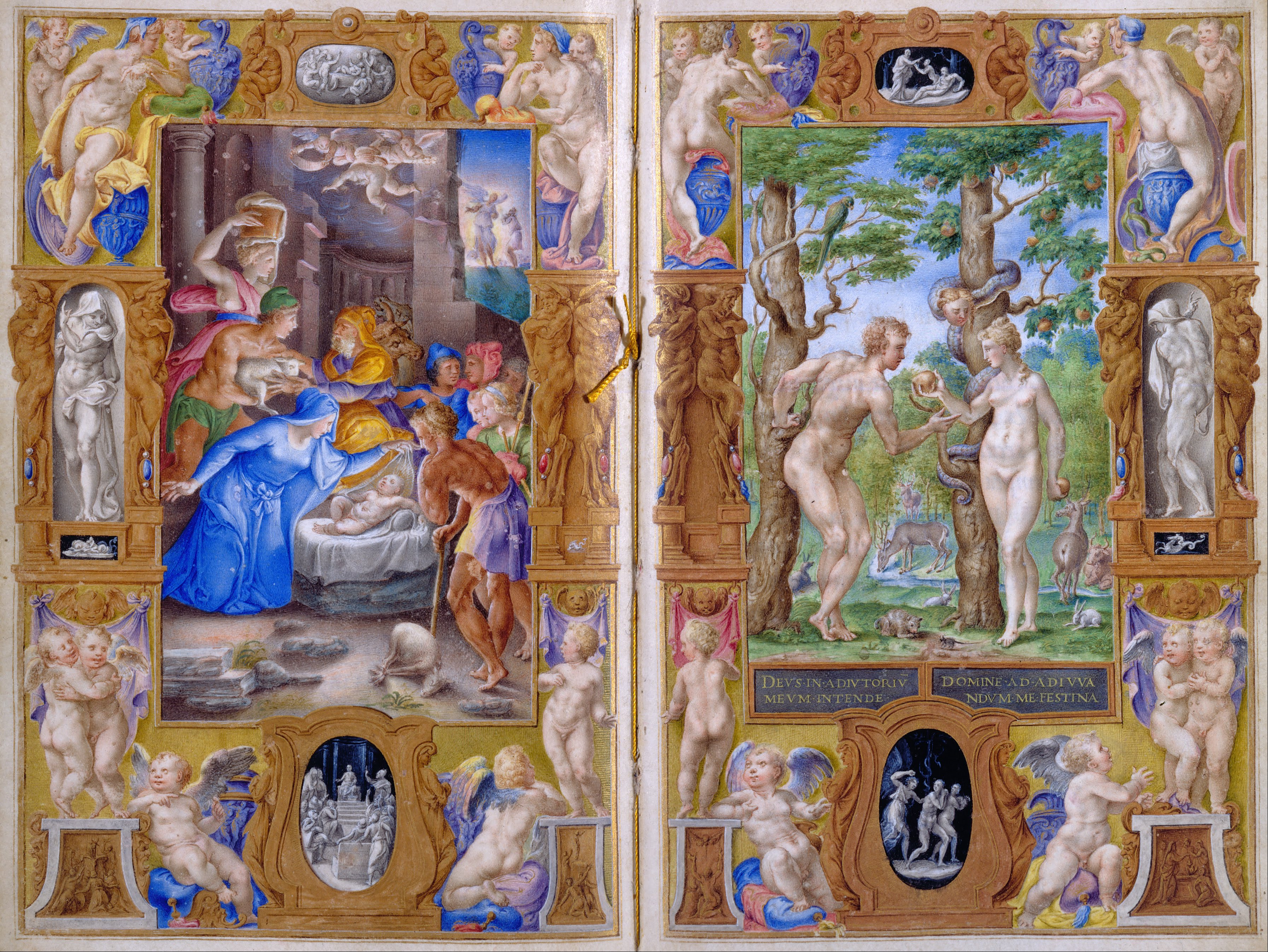
Farnese Hours by Giulio Clovio (1546), Morgan Library & Museum

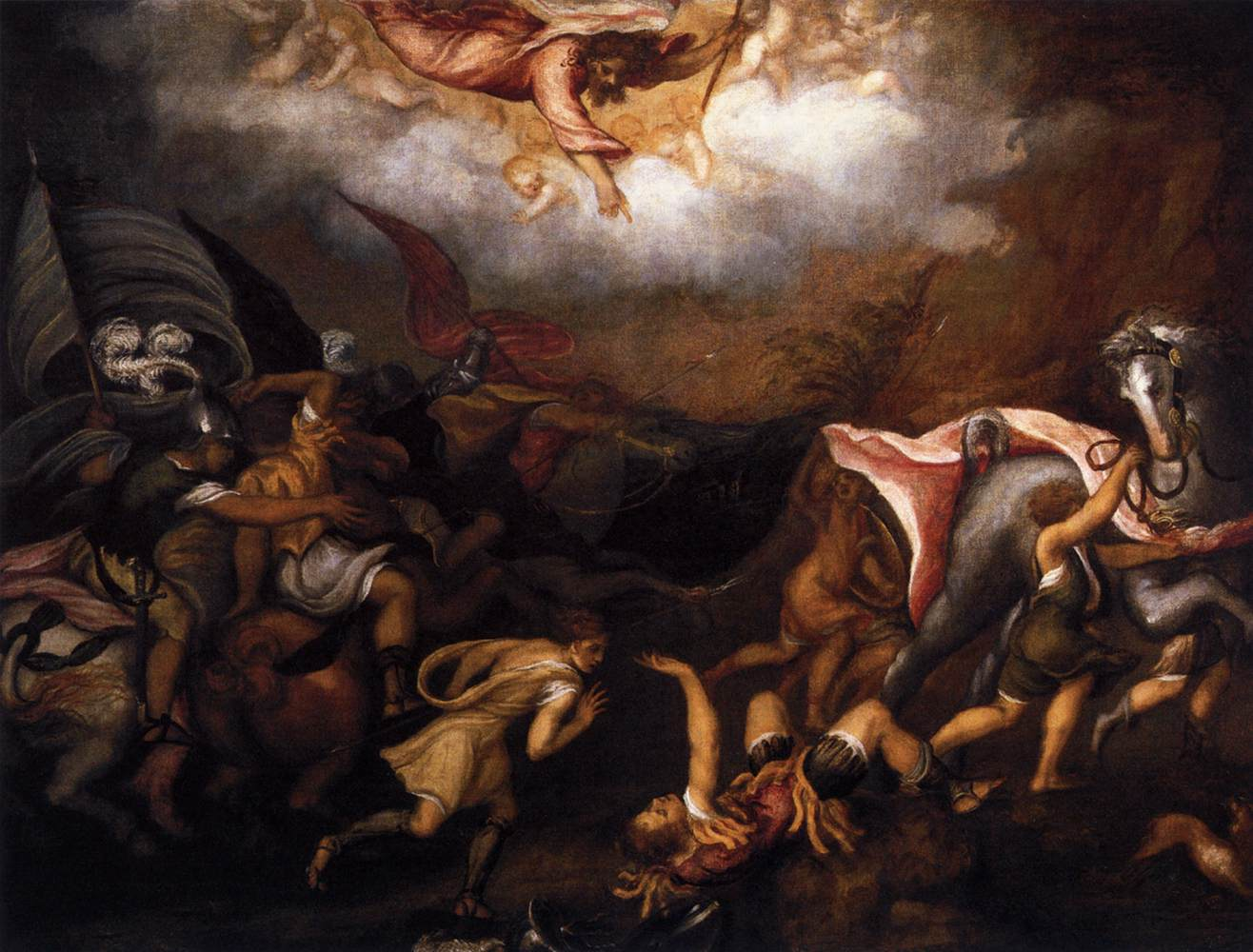
Conversion of Paul by Andrea Schiavone (c. 1540-1545), Pinacoteca Querini Stampalia

== Baroque and Rococo ==
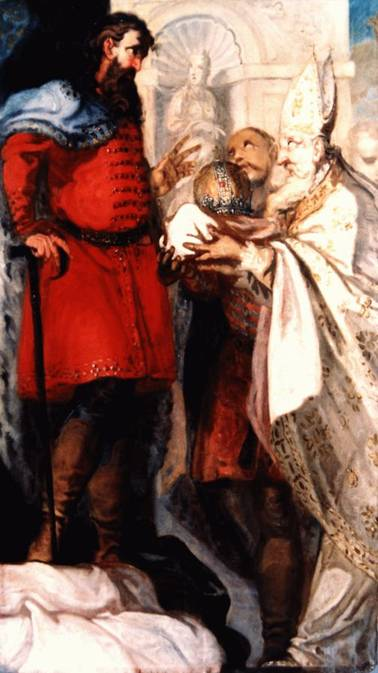
Painting from the altar of Zagreb Cathedral, dated c. 1690, attributed to Bernardo Bobić

Going into the 17th century, there was a shift of artistic activity away from the coastal region towards inland, continental Croatia. As part of the Venetian Republic, Dalmatia began to rely increasingly on importing art and artists from Italy, particularly Rome and Venice. Meanwhile as the invading Ottomans were pushed back, the north would gradually emerge from a century of war, to improve fortifications, rebuild devastated towns, and enjoy a revival of the arts.

There were few Croatian artists and architects producing high quality work during the period. Between the slow recovery of the inland population after the war, and the preference in the coastal regions to employ foreign artists and sculptors, it was mainly Italians, Austrian and Slovenes who created and decorated the many Baroque buildings in Croatia. There was a significant increase in the commissioning of large baroque altars in multi-coloured marble with ornate carving. These were mainly imported from Italy, and replaced the existing stone or wood altars.

The ornate Baroque style originated in Rome as a reaction to the counter-reformation in northern Europe, and the Jesuits played a major role in introducing it to Croatia. Large imposing churches were built in numerous places across the country, with accompanying colleges. The most important sites were in Zagreb, Rijeka, and Dubrovnik.

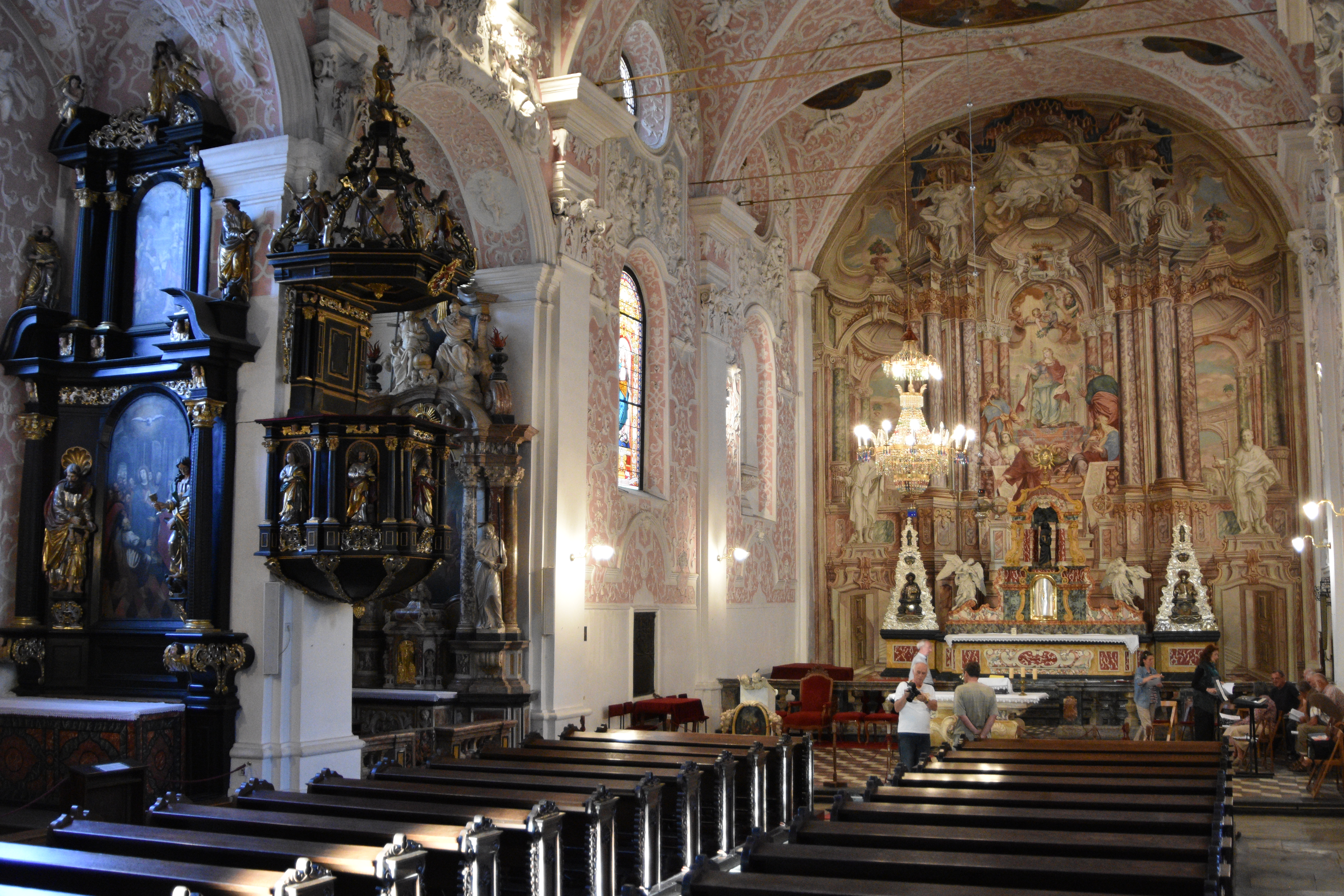
Baroque interior of St. Catherine's Church, Zagreb, 1632

St. Catherine's Church, Zagreb is one of the most outstanding examples of Baroque Jesuit architecture in northern Croatia, with its elaborate interior decoration. Completed in 1632, it was renovated in the 18th century following a major fire. The ornate stucco ceiling is by Anton Joseph Quadrio (1721), with frescoes of the heavens by Giulio Quaglio the Younger. Behind the altar is a large trompe l’oeil fresco by Krištof Andrej Jelovšek (1762). The six side chapels have two altars each, the finest by sculptor Francesco Robba.

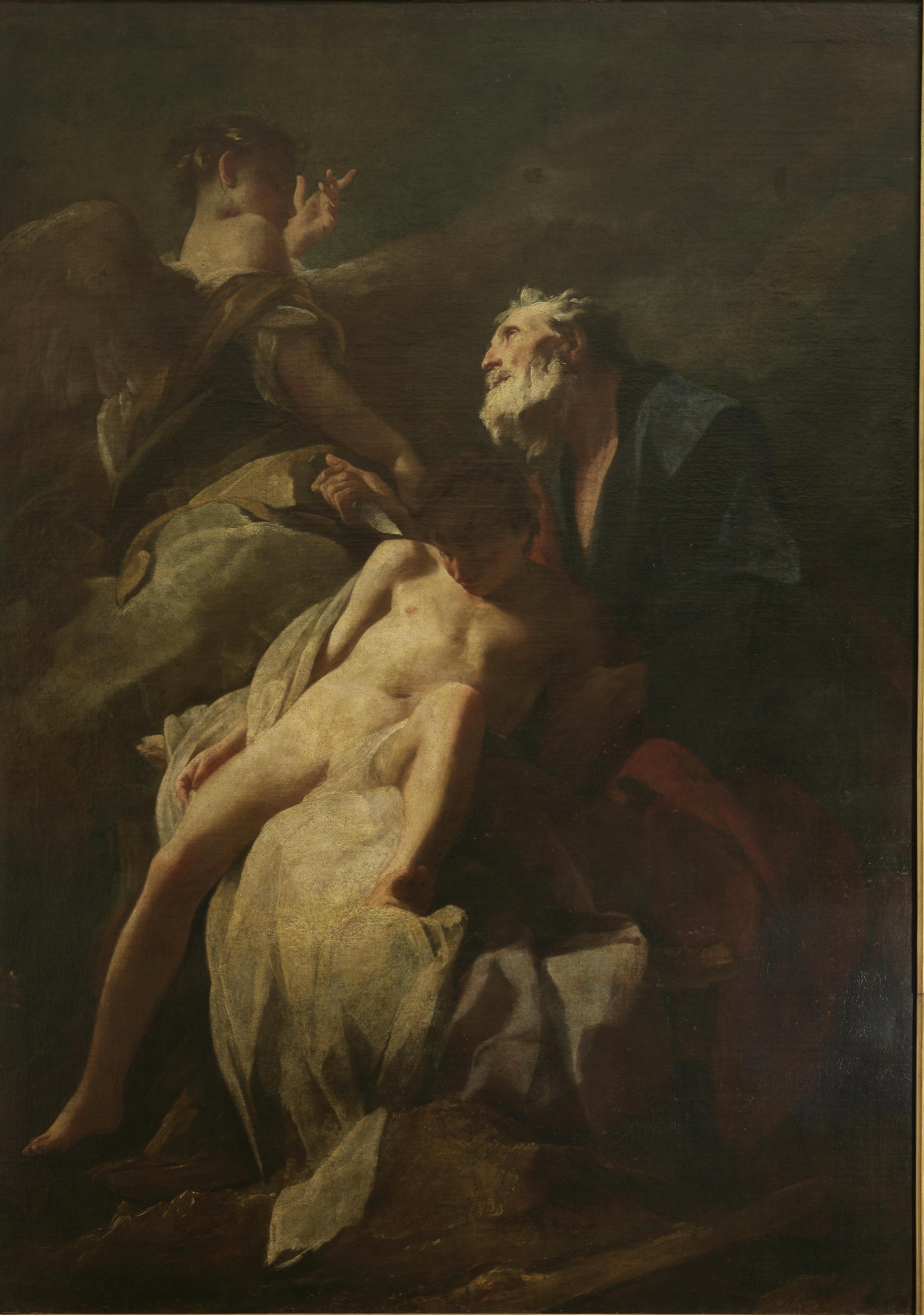
Abraham's Sacrifice of Isaac (1715) by Federico Bencovich, Strossmayer Gallery of Old Masters

The biggest Baroque project was the rebuilding of renaissance Dubrovnik after the catastrophic earthquake of 1667 when almost the entire city was destroyed. Many of its churches and public buildings were constructed from the ground up in the new Baroque style, for example the new cathedral, the Jesuit college with the church of St Ignatius, and the church of St Vlaho on the main square (1715) which shaped the southeastern section of the city. Pietro Passalaqua united the new baroque areas with his Jesuit Stairway, (reminiscent of the famous Spanish Steps in Rome) which led to the Ivan Gundulić Square below.

During the Baroque numerous churches were built across Croatia. One of the most beautiful is the church of Maria of the Snow in Belec from 1740 with the entire interior filled with lively gilded wooden sculptures, and frescoes by the painter Ivan Ranger from Austria. He was a classic Rococo painter whose figures were softly painted in graceful positions in cheerful colours.

The most important baroque painter of Dalmatian origin was Federico Bencovich, who studied under Carlo Cignani in Bologna. Other Croatian-born artists of the time include painter Bernardo Bobić, who worked mainly in Zagreb and northern Croatia, Matteo Ponzone, who was probably born on the island of Rab, and worked primarily in Italy, and Tripo Kokolja of Kotor who was active in Dalmatia.

== The 19th century ==
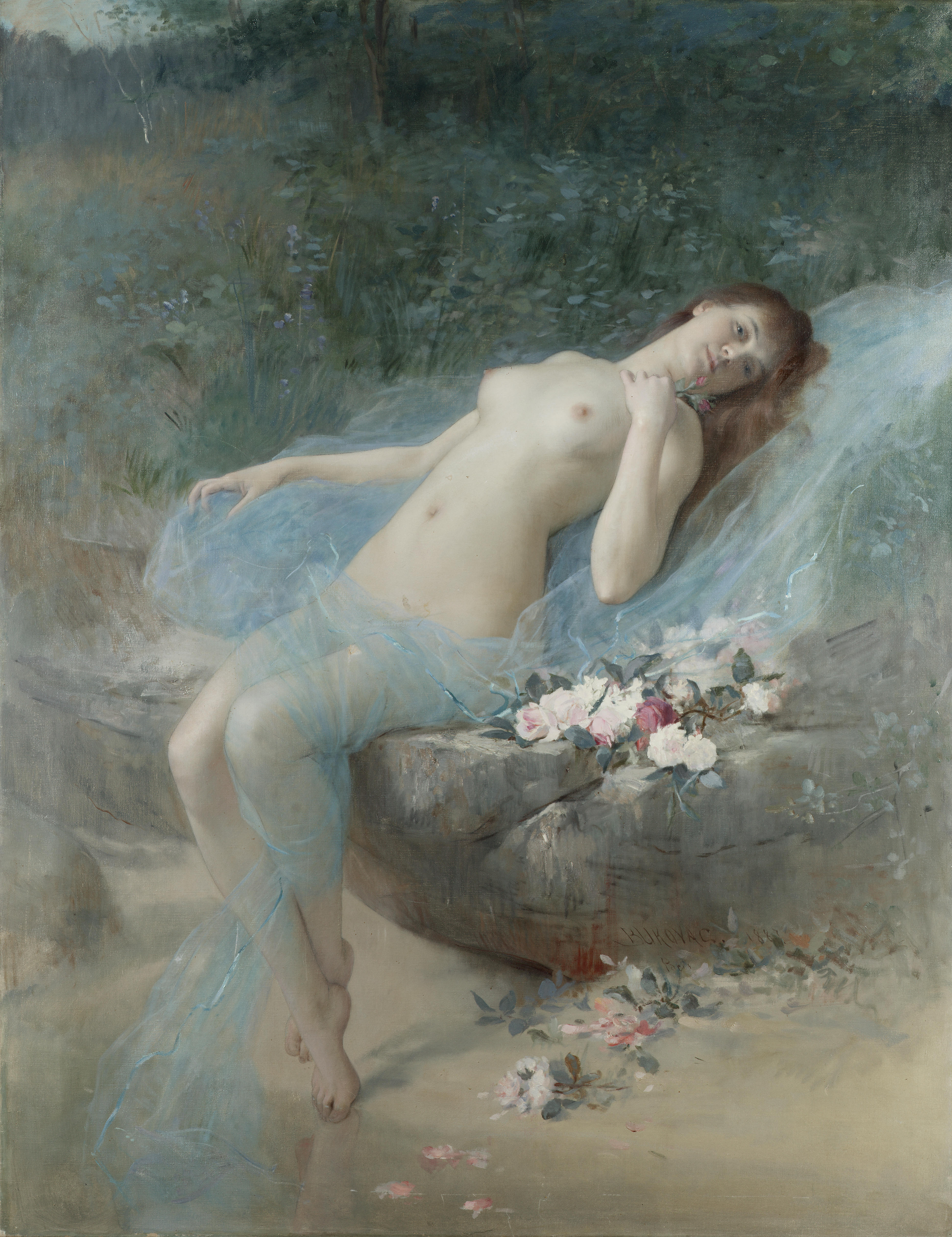
Une fleur by Vlaho Bukovac, 1887, Private collection

Two crucial European events shaped the influences on Croatia towards the end of the 18th century. The fall of the Venetian Republic in 1797 was followed by the Napoleonic conquest and formation of the short-lived Illyrian Provinces from 1809 to 1814. Afterwards, all of Croatia was ruled by the Austrian Empire, and remained so until the First World War. During that time, neoclassical was the style for grand buildings, and Romanticism flourished in the arts, with its emphasis on the glories of nature and authenticity of folk art. In the houses of ordinary people, simple decoration and cheerful colours prevailed, and Biedermeier furniture became popular. Artistic life within Croatia was now focused on Zagreb, with strong connections to Viennese culture and Central Europe. It was not until much later in the century that Croatian artists began to go wider afield to study — to Munich, Prague and Paris.

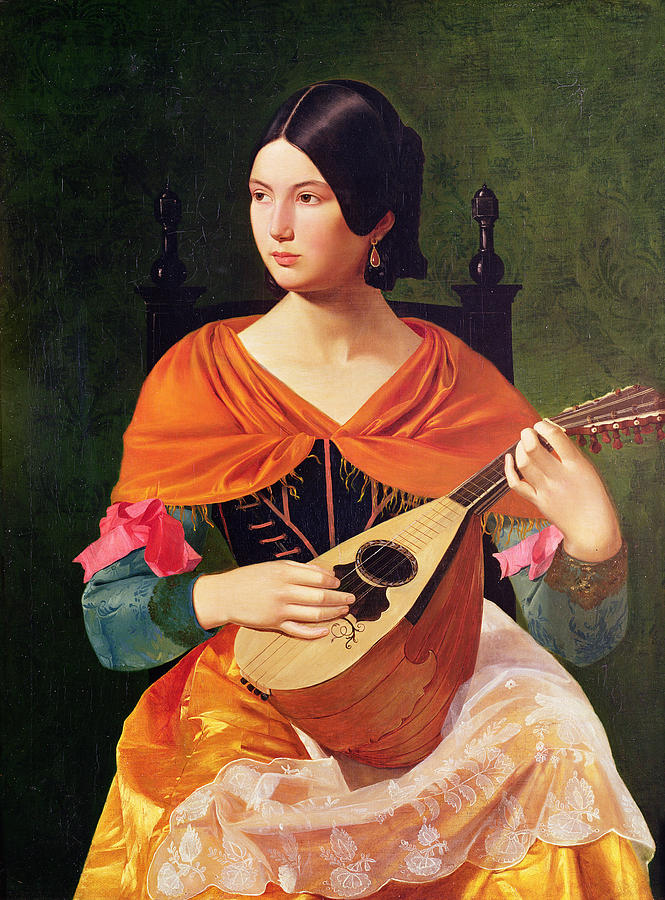
Roman woman with a lute by Vjekoslav Karas, ca. 1846, Croatian History Museum

At the same time, the cities of Croatia got an important urban makeover. For size and importance, the urban redesign of Zagreb's centre (largely the work of Milan Lenuzzio, 1860–1880) was revolutionary. Between the longest street, Ilica, and the new railway, streets were laid out in a grid pattern with large public and social buildings, such as the neo-Renaissance Croatian Academy of Sciences and Arts (F. Scmidt, 1884), the neo-baroque Croatian National Theatre (H. Helmer and F. Fellner, 1895), and the very modern Art Pavilion (1898) with montage construction of steel and glass – Croatian "Crystal Palace", and finally the masterpiece of Art Nouveau – The National Library by Croatian architect Rudolf Lubinski, finished in 1912. This urban plan is bounded by series of parks and parkways decorated with numerous fountains, sculptures, avenues and gardens (known as the "Green Horseshoe").

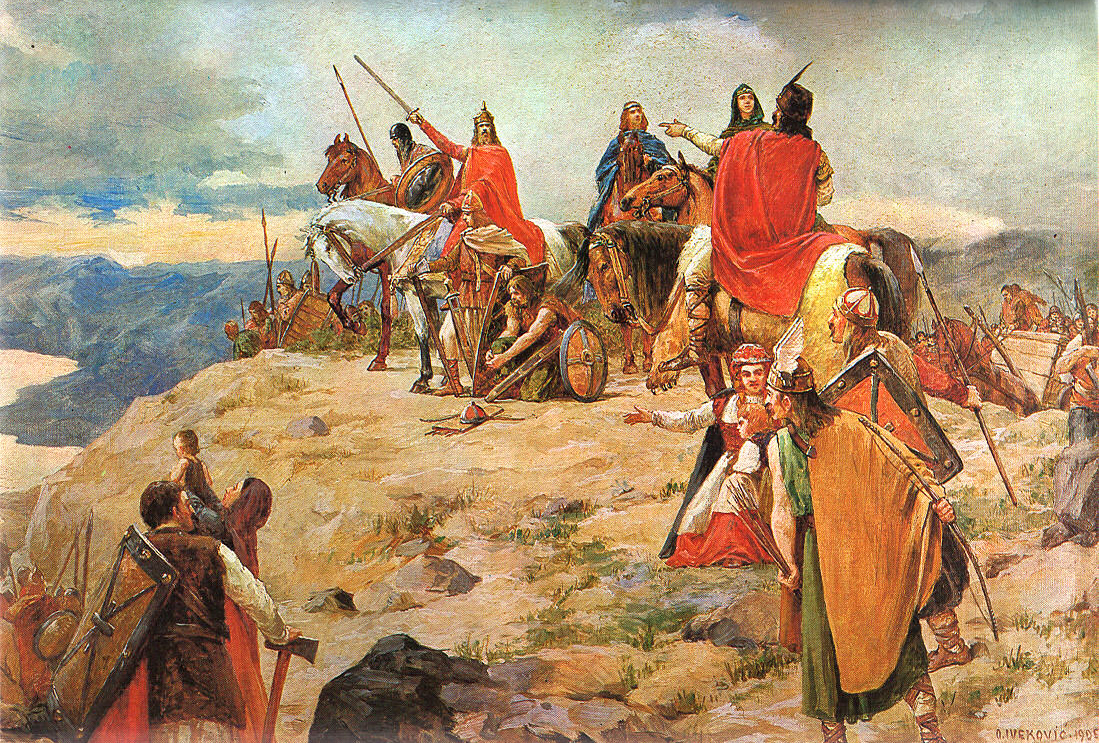
The Arrival of the Croats at the Adriatic Sea by Oton Iveković, 1905

The building that emphasizes all three visual arts is the former Ministry of Worship and Education, now the Croatian Institute of History in Zagreb (Hermann Bollé, 1895). Along with rooms in Pompeii style and renaissance cabinet, the large neo-baroque "Golden Hall" contains historic paintings by Bela Čikoš-Sesija (The Baptism of Croats and Split Council), Oton Iveković (Meeting of Koloman and Croatian Nobility), Mato Celestin Medović (The Arrival of Croats), Vlaho Bukovac (Franz Joseph in Zagreb) and decorated with reliefs by Robert Frangeš-Mihanović. "The Golden Hall" became a unified monument to its time, one of few in Europe.

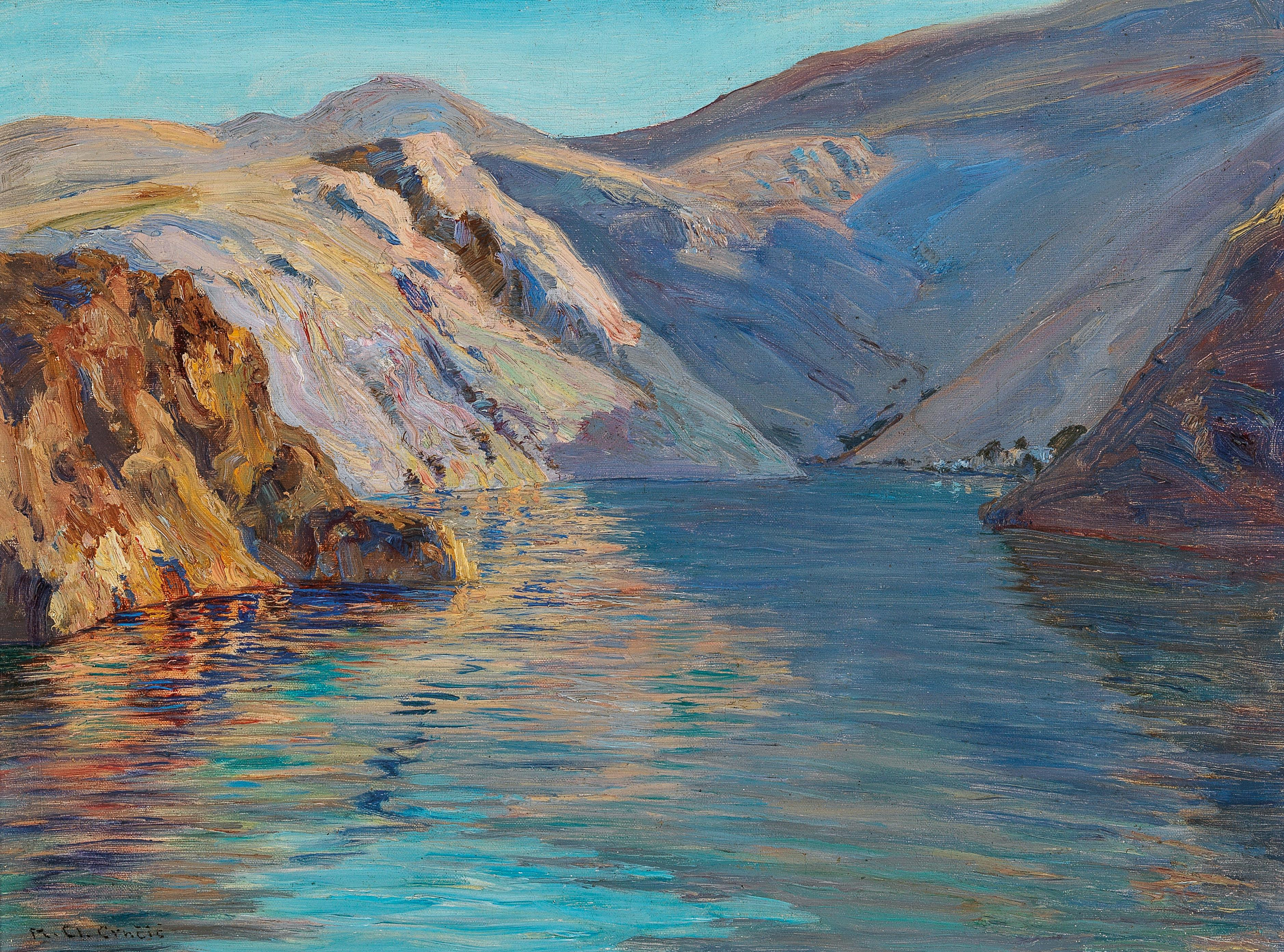
Zrnovnica II by Menci Klement Crnčić

Realism appeared in the bourgeois portraits by Vjekoslav Karas. The characters of his portraits are true expressions of their time. Realistic landscapes are linked to certain parts of the country – Slavonian forests by artists of Osijek school, Dubrovnik in works of Celestin Medović, and Dalmatian coast in works of Menci Klement Crnčić.

In sculpture the hard realism (naturalism) of Ivan Rendić was replaced by Art Nouveau composed and moving reliefs by Robert Frangeš-Mihanović. Slava Raškaj is particularly notable for her watercolours.

Vlaho Bukovac brought the spirit of Impressionism from Paris, and he strongly influenced the young artists (including the authors of "Golden Hall"). Right after he painted the screen in HNK in Zagreb with the theme of Croatian Illyrian Movement, and symbolic portraits of Croatian Writers in National Library, he founded The Society of Croatian Artists (1897), the so-called "Zagreb's colorful school". With this society the Croatian Modern Art started. On the Millennium Exhibition in Budapest they were able to set aside all other artistic options in Austria-Hungary.

== The 20th century ==
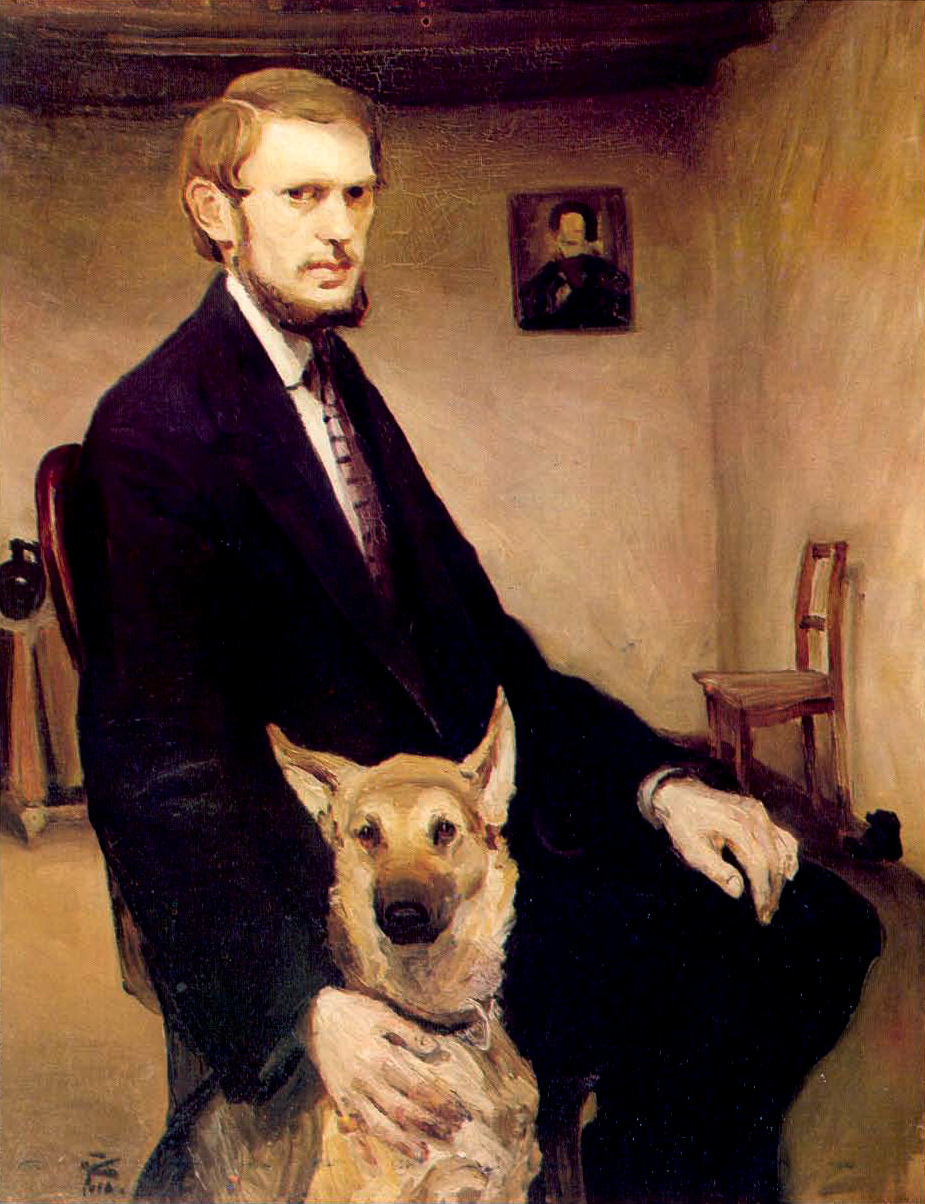
Self-portrait with Dog (Autoportret sa psom) by Miroslav Kraljević (1910) Modern Gallery, Zagreb

Modern art in Croatia began with the secessionist ideas spreading from Vienna and Munich, and Post-Impressionism from Paris. The Munich Circle used values to create volume in their paintings, in a style much simplified from more detailed earlier, academic style. The Medulic Society of sculptors and painters from Split brought themes of national history and legends to their art, and some of the artwork following the First World War contained a strong political message against the ruling Austro-Hungarian state. The Zagreb Spring Salon provided an annual showcase of the local art scene, and a big change was noticeable in 1919 with a move to flatter forms, and signs of Cubism and expressionism were evident. The avant-garde Zenit Group of the 1920s pushed for integrating the new art forms with the native cultural identity. At the same time, the Earth Group sought to reflect reality and social issues in their art, a movement that also saw the development of naive art. The 1930s saw a return to more simple, classical styles.

Following the Second World War, artists everywhere were searching for meaning and identity, leading to abstract expressionism in the U.S. and art informel in Europe. In the new Yugoslavia, the communist social realism style never took hold, but Exat 51 showed the way with geometric abstraction in paintings and simplified spaces in architecture.

Pafama by Josip Seissel (1922), Museum of Contemporary Art, Zagreb

In the 1950s, Antun Motika, one of the most celebrated modern Croatian artists together with Ivan Meštrović, generated a strong reaction from the critics with his exhibition of drawings Archaic Surrealism (Arhajski nadrealizam). The exhibition had a lasting effect on Croatian art circles, and is generally considered to be the boldest rejection of the dogmatic frameworks of socialist realism in Croatia.

The Gorgona Group of the 1960s advocated non-conventional forms of visual expression, published their own anti-magazine, and were preoccupied by the absurd. At the same time, the New Tendencies series of exhibits held in conjunction with meetings displayed a more analytical approach to art, and a move towards New Media, such as photography, video, computer art, performance art and installations, focused more on the artists' process. The Biafra Group of the 1970s was figurative and expressionist, engaging their audience directly. By the 1980s, the New Image movement brought a return to more traditional painting and images.

== See also ==
- Croatian Architecture
- List of Croatian sculptors
- History of Croatia
- Croatian literature
- Theatre in Croatia
- Music of Croatia
- Category:World Heritage Sites in Croatia
