= List of Croatian artists =

Artists who are born and/or primarily active in Croatia

This is a list of artists (painters, sculptors, architects and printmakers) who were born and/or were primarily active in Croatia. The artists are sorted by century and then alphabetically by last name.

== 13th century ==
- Andrija Buvina
- Radovan (Majstor Radovan); sculptor

== 15th century ==
- Andrija Aleši (1425–1505); sculptor and architect
- Nikola Božidarević (c. 1460–1517); painter
- Giovanni Dalmata (Ivan Duknović)c. 1440 – c. 1514); sculptor
- Lovro Dobričević (c. 1420–1478); painter
- Francesco Laurana (Frane Vranjanin) (c. 1430–1502); sculptor
- Giorgio da Sebenico (Juraj Dalmatinac) (c. 1410–1473); sculptor

== 16th century ==
- Julije Klović (1498–1578); painter
- Martino Rota (1520–1583), painter and engraver

== 18th century ==
- Federiko Benković (1667–1753)
- Ivan Ranger (1700–1753)

== 19th century ==
- Vlaho Bukovac (1855–1922); painter
- Menci Klement Crnčić (1865–1930); painter
- Hugo Conrad von Hötzendorf (c. 1806-1869); painter
- Vjekoslav Karas (1821–1858); painter
- Izidor Kršnjavi (1845-1927); painter
- Celestin Medović (1857–1920); painter
- Ferdo Quiquerez (1845-1893); painter
- Slava Raškaj (1877–1906); painter
- Ivan Rendić (1849–1932); sculptor
- Adolf Waldinger (1843–1904); painter

== 20th century ==
- Alfred Albini (1896–1978); architect
- Oskar Alexander (1876–1953); painter
- Antun Augustinčić (1900–1979); sculptor
- Viktor Axmann (1878–1946); architect
- Ljubo Babić (1890–1974); painter, graphic artist, set designer
- Robert Baća (1949-2019); painter and sculptor
- Vjekoslav Bastl (1872–1947); architect
- Vladimir Becić (1886–1954); painter
- Lujo Bezeredi (1898–1979); painter
- Charles Billich (b. 1934); painter
- Slavko Brill (1900–1943); sculptor
- Bela Čikoš Sesija (1864–1931); painter
- Josip Crnobori (1907–2005); painter
- Tošo Dabac (1907–1970); photographer
- Ante Dabro (b. 1938); sculptor
- Branislav Dešković (1883–1939); sculptor
- Julio Deutsch (1859–1922); architect
- Josip Demirović Devj (1939–1999); painter and sculptor
- Jelena Dorotka (1876–1965); painter
- Dušan Džamonja (1928–2009); sculptor
- Hugo Ehrlich (1879–1936); architect
- Eva Fischer (1920–2015); painter
- Ignjat Fischer (1870–1948); architect
- Robert Frangeš Mihanović (1872–1940); sculptor
- Vilko Gecan (1894–1973); painter
- Ivan Generalić (1914–1992); painter
- Stjepan Gomboš (1895–1975); architect
- Oton Gliha (1914–1999); painter
- Petar Grgec (1933–2006); painter
- Krsto Hegedušić (1901–1975); painter and illustrator
- Oskar Herman (1886–1974); painter
- Leo Hönigsberg (1861–1911); architect
- Josip Horvat Međimurec (1904–1945); painter
- Drago Ibler (1894–1964); architect
- Oton Iveković (1869–1939); painter
- Sanja Iveković (b. 1949); photographer, sculptor
- Ignjat Job (1895–1936); painter
- Jozo Kljaković (1889–1969); painter
- Julije Knifer (1924–2004); painter
- Viktor Kovačić (1874–1924); architect
- Ivan Kožarić (1921–2020); sculptor
- Miroslav Kraljević (1885–1913); painter
- Frano Kršinić (1897–1982); sculptor
- Heddy Kun (b. 1936); painter
- Ivan Lacković Croata (1932–2004); painter
- Vasko Lipovac (1931–2006); painter and sculptor
- Zvonimir Lončarić (1927–2004); painter and sculptor
- Slavko Löwy (1904–1996); architect
- Rudolf Lubinski (1873–1935); architect
- Ivan Meštrović (1883–1962); sculptor
- Ivan Milat (1922–2009); painter
- Antun Motika (1902–1992); painter
- Franjo Mraz (1910–1981); painter
- Marko Murat (1864–1944); painter
- Edo Murtić (1921–2005); painter
- Oscar Nemon (1906–1985); sculptor
- Alfred Pal (1920–2010); painter
- Renato Percan (1936–2013); painter
- Ordan Petlevski (1930–1997); painter
- Ivan Picelj (1924–2011); painter
- Stjepan Planić (1900–1980); architect
- Vera Nikolić Podrinska (1886–1972); painter
- Oton Postružnik (1900–1978); painter
- Ivan Rabuzin (1921–2008); painter
- Josip Račić (1885–1908); painter
- Mirko Rački (1879–1982); painter
- Ivan Rein (1905–1943); painter
- Vjenceslav Richter (1917–2002); architect
- Nasta Rojc (1883–1964), painter
- Toma Rosandić (1878–1958); sculptor
- Branko Šenoa (1879–1939); painter
- Ana Sladetić (b. 1985); painter
- Miljenko Stančić (1926–1977); painter
- Vladimir Šterk (1891–1941); architect
- Zlatko Šulentić (1893-1971); painter
- Miroslav Šutej (1936–2005); painter and printmaker
- Marino Tartaglia (1894–1984); painter
- Ivan Tišov (1870–1928); painter
- Ivana Tomljenović-Meller (1906–1988); graphic designer
- Marijan Trepše (1887-1964); painter
- Marija Ujević-Galetović (1933–2023); sculptor
- Milivoj Uzelac (1897–1977); painter
- Maksimilijan Vanka (1889–1963); painter
- Vladimir Varlaj (1895–1962); painter
- Mladen Veža (1916–2010); painter and illustrator
- Mirko Virius (1889–1943); painter

== 21st century ==
- Stanka Gjuric (b. 1956); filmmaker

== See also ==
- List of Croatian architects
