= Salon Galić =

Art gallery in Split, Croatia

- Salon Galić
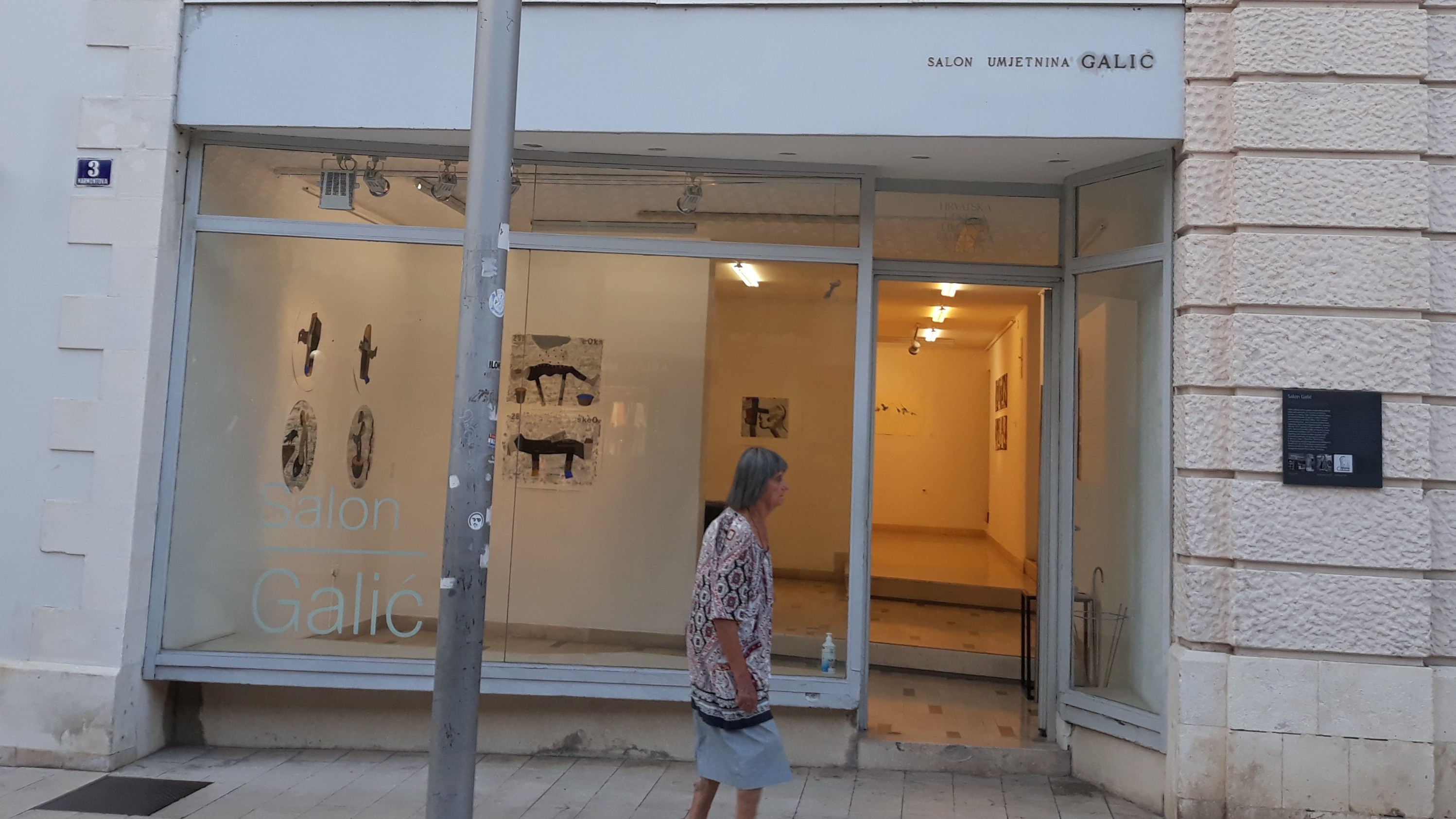

General information
- Location: Auguste de Marmont Street 3, Split, Croatia
- Coordinates: 43°30′34″N 16°26′14″E
- Construction started: May 1924
- Completed: 1924

Salon Galić is Split's oldest exhibition space, located in the heart of the town on Marmont Street 3. It was founded by Hrvace-born artisan Ivan Galić in May 1924 and was the only art gallery in Split during the interbellum.

In the aforementioned period, the gallery hosted exhibitions of artists that would soon become famous for their art, including Emanuel Vidović, Angjeo Uvodić, Ivan Meštrović, Antun Motika, Branislav Dešković, the Earth Group, and many others. It remains prominent and prestigious within the Croatian art scene and has since become one of Croatia's most popular and acclaimed cultural destinations, hosting over fifteen exhibitions a year and numerous other related events, including the Splitgraphic Biennial and the Radoslav Putar Awards.

It has been managed by Croatian Association of Visual Artists since 1961, and in the six decades that followed hosted over a thousand exhibitions. In 2014, the Ministry of Culture declared Salon Galić a cultural asset by the Directorate for the Protection of Cultural Heritage. In 2024, the gallery celebrated its 100th birthday with a universally praised retrospective by Sandi Bulimbašić and Jasminka Babić.

== History and development ==
Salon Galić was the only art gallery during the interwar period dedicated to the artists' practical need for presentation. Although the Fine Arts Gallery in Split was established in 1931, it did not host exhibitions until 1950. Before the gallery's inception in 1924, the spatial options for artists to exhibit their work were mostly limited to shop windows on the city square, the foyer in the Croatian National Theatre and select rooms in the Male Real school, the Cindro Palace and the Bishop's Palace. Possible somewhat viable exhibition spaces also included rooms in the first building of Domald Street and in the secessionist Hrvatski Dom, built in 1908.

The Salon was officially open on May 31, 1924, with the inaugural exhibition of paintings by Angjeo Uvodić and Emanuel Vidović, with the former also presenting caricatures. Art expert and historian Milan Ivanišević collected the original works for a 1994 retrospective, honouring the gallery's 70th anniversary. Even though the town's interwar population, barely exceeding 35,000 people, was mostly illiterate, the gallery's exhibitions fared commercially well, as the townsfolk were financially supportive for their fellow artist citizens. Most of the original works currently belong to the Gallery of Fine Arts and the City Museum.

The Salon's ground floor was built in 1925 on Marmont Street 3, between a historical high-riser of the Prokurative square and the Art Nouveau-inspired Duplančić house. The latter granted Galić the polygonal annex from its south facade while its official position was under construction. Today the Salon's secessionist neighbour and previous home, the multistorey Duplančić building, houses the city photo club's official photo gallery.

The building was reinnovated multiple times. According to the Soldatić family archives, the forepart of the Salon was initially a brick facade. It was replaced by the wide and welcoming glass window in 1940. It underwent a more challenging reconstruction in December 1963, as its entire foundation was bolstered with reinforced concrete and other modern materials, in a feat overseen by the Urbanist Bureau employee Berislav Kalogjera, whose simultaneous project, the Bastion Hotel on the north side of Marmont Street, bears a noticeable morphological resemblance to the 1963 redesign of Salon Galić. The "simple, yet elegant" conception of the diagonally recessed facade has been called "a reflection of the subtle and unpretentious architectural styles of the post-war modernist period."

=== HULU's tenure ===
Galić passed on the managerial duties to the Croatian Association of Visual Artists (Hrvatske udruge likovnih umjetnika, or HULU Split) after his death in 1961. During its tenure, HULU hosted over a thousand exhibitions by prominent contemporary artists from Croatia, Norway, Sweden, Kosovo, Italy, Israel, Spain, Germany, Japan, Vietnam and numerous other countries, and other art-related happenings, including the annual Radoslav Putar Awards that hosts an exhibition of 4 finalists with one selected for a 2-month residency in NYC hosted by Residency Unlimited. For their artistic and humanitarian work, the Split-based Association has amassed numerous awards and orders, including the Split City Coat of Arms for Outstanding Contributions to the Development and Reputation of the City of Split, an honorary distinction from the Croatian Community of Independent Artists and an accolade from the Central Hospital for a charitable art auction featuring members' paintings for the Children's Clinic in Split.

== Activities ==
From 1924 to 1942, Salon Galić hosted 120 exhibitions of notable Croatian artists, including Emanuel Vidović, Angjeo Uvodić, Ivan Mirković, Tomislav Krizman, Marino Tartaglia, Ignjat Job, Juraj Plančić, Jerolim Miše, Vjekoslav Parać, Antun Zuppa, Branislav Dešković, Vladimir Becić, Ljubo Babić, Zlatko Šulentić, Vladimir Varlaj, Jozo Kljaković, Ivan Meštrović, Antun Motika and many others. Exhibitions for contemporary Croatian artists were also hosted, including Earth Group, namely Krsto and Željko Hegedušić, Antun Augustinčić, Petar Smajić, Frano Kršinić and Ivan Generalić. As most of the Earth Group members were not affirmed yet, Salon Galić was instrumental in creating names as Augustinčić and Smajić. Salon Galić was also a popular destination for other artists, including novelist Dinko Šimunović, poet Tin Ujević and poetry-prose writer Vladimir Nazor, who frequented the Salon. Ujević dubbed founder Ivan Galić a "chef of taste" (šef ukusa).

An exhibition of grave historical importance was the 1925 collective effort of Slovene artists and their expressionist-inspired paintings, including the works of Božidar Jakac, France and Tone Kralj, Veno Pilon, Fran Stiplovšek, Drago and Nando Vidmar and Fran Zupan. Among the works, the most successful one was the Jajčarice by France Kralj, inspired by German expressionism. The work today is stored in the collection of the Fine Arts Gallery and received a resurgence in interest as a seminal piece of the centennial retrospective in 2024.

One of the most progressive artist collectives in interwar Yugoslavia, the Belgrade-based Oblik group held an influential exhibition in May 1930, inspired by the contemporary French scene opposed to the dominant one of Germany, where the works of Nikola Bešević, Jovan Bijelić, Petar Dobrović, Anton Hutter, Đorđe Andrejević Kun, Veljko Stanojević, Zora Petrović and Ivan Radović were bought by then-mayor dr. Ivo Tartaglia.

Other revolutionary exhibitions included the Independent Group of Croatian Artists and the aforementioned Earth Group, which exhibited under the name Group of Croatian Painters, as they were banned from performing for their highly concentrated social critique ans its left-wing political opinions in April 1935. The Gallery of Fine Arts bought works by Edo Kovačević, Antun Mezdjić, Antun Šimek and Vilim Svečnjak. Svečnjak's work Komedijaši is a feature in the Gallery's regular repertoire.

Emanuel Vidović returned to exhibit in 1939 and 1941, presenting a new brand of poetics exploring still life thematically via the interiors of the Split and Trogir Cathedral. The gallery stopped its practice during the Second World War, but returned in the summer of 1945. From 1946 to 1949 the Salon hosted annually the First of May Exhibitions of the Dalmatian branch of the Croatian Association of Fine Artists, to both critical and commercial acclaim.

Salon Galić also featured a prolific range of caricature-based exhibitions, the most popular being the satirical creations that shared the poetical principles of the artists behind the pre-war magazine Duje Balavac. Beside the 1924 and 1926 Angjeo Uvodić exhibitions, caricaturists that took their works to Salon Galić included Ivan Mirković in 1928, Ladislav Kondor in 1939, Uroš Marović in the two pre-WW2 years and Milan Tolić in 1961. Mirko vić also exhibited sculptures and in the steps of Uvodić provided essayistic commentary prommoting caricatures an artistic medium.

=== International guests ===
Salon Galić attracted a wide and vast array of international artists during the interwar period. Russian-born painters Aleksanar Lažečnikov and Ilija Ahmetov exhibited two eclectic and expressive efforts in 1925 and 1929, respectively. Inspired by Split's old urban core, Austrian painter and graphic designer Wilhelm Saure created a piece that was planned to express sentiments of an old, historical and raw town, exhibited in 1926. Ukrainian artist Ipolit Danilovič Majkovski undersigns three stylistically different and well-received exhibitions, in 1927, 1930 and 1937.

International artists that have exhibited in Salon Galić also include Bulgarian post-impressionist painter Nikola Tanev (in 1930), German architect Walter von Wecus (in 1933 and 1935, with the former garnering a record-high audience attendance for the time, according to Stanko Piplović), Dutch-based painter and writer J. B. Kobè (in 1935), painters Hans Gassebner from Germany and Philip Ullott from England in a joint exhibition (in 1939, with the latter's "skillfully composed watercolour full of liveliness" attracting public interest), Czech artist Alois Lecoque (in 1940) and in the same year, Berlin-born Rudolf Bunk, who moved to Split after his exhibition, inspired by Matisse and Picasso.

=== Other activities ===
Salon Galić also mediated various administrative businesses. By 1927, the only school building in Split was the Male Real School. Drafts for building the first primary school in Lučac from Split, Zagreb, Ljubljana and Paris were presented at Salon Galić on January 16 the same year. Complications with the municipal board however proved decisive with the project's completion, and the block Manuš homed the first elementary school building in 1930.
