= Croatian art of the 20th century =

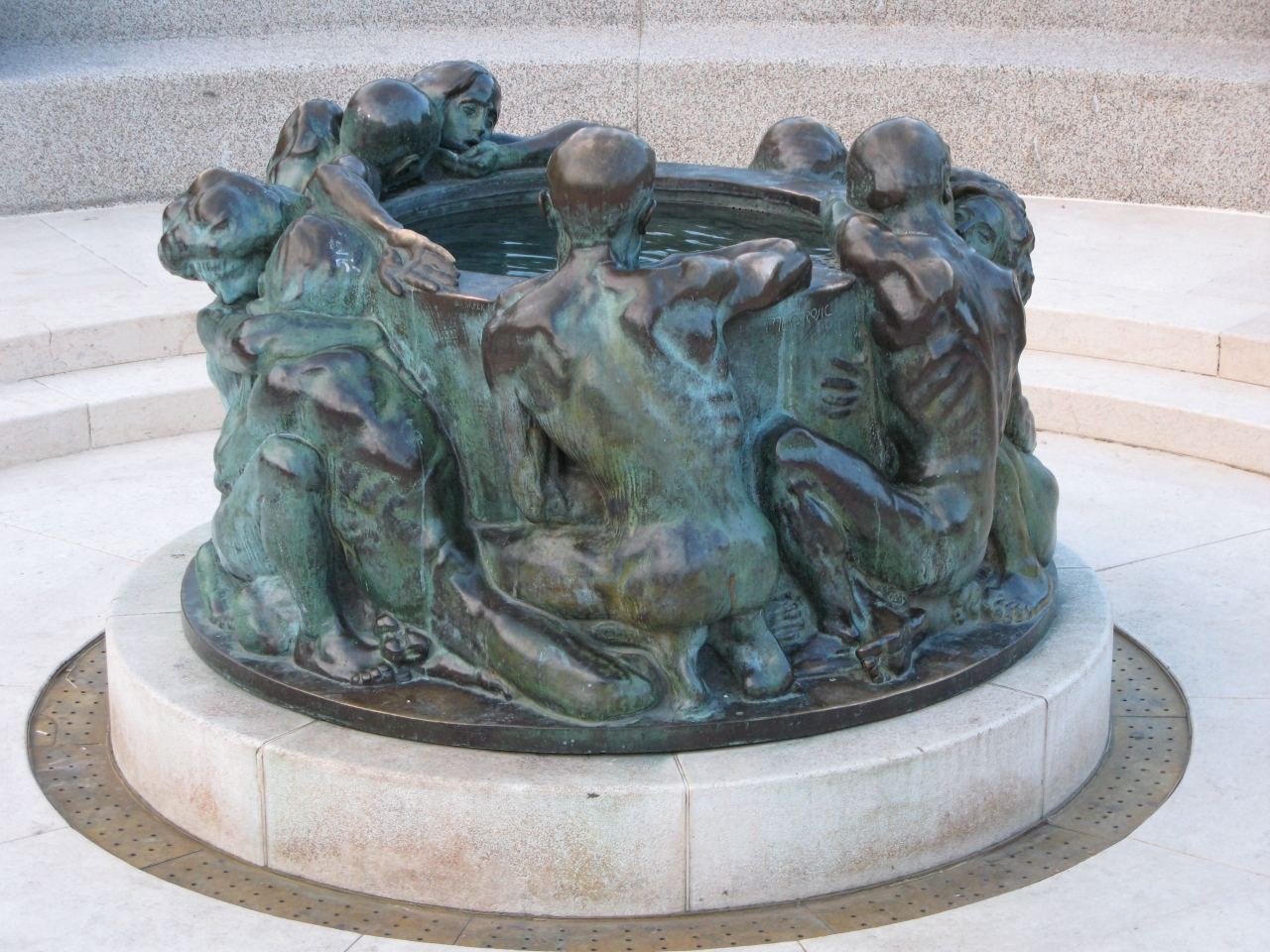
Ivan Meštrović, Well of Life, 1905, bronze in front of Croatian National Theatre in Zagreb.

Croatian art of the 20th century, that is visual arts within the boundaries of today's Croatia, can be divided into modern art up to the Second World War, and contemporary art afterwards.

Modern art in Croatia began with the Secession ideas spreading from Vienna and Munich, and post-Impressionism from Paris. Young artists would study the latest trends and integrate them into their own work. Many strove to bring a native cultural identity into their art, for example themes of national history and legends, and some of the artwork following the First World War contained a strong political message against the ruling Austro-Hungarian state. A change was noticeable in 1919 with a move to flatter forms, and signs of cubism and expressionism were evident. In the 1920s, the Earth Group sought to reflect reality and social issues in their art, a movement that also saw the development of naive art. By the 1930s there was a return to more simple, classical styles.

Following the Second World War, artists everywhere were searching for meaning and identity, leading to abstract expressionism in the U.S. and art informel in Europe. In the new Yugoslavia, the socialist realism style never took hold, but bauhaus ideas led to geometric abstraction in paintings and simplified spaces in architecture. In the 1960s, non-conventional forms of visual expression took hold along with a more analytical approach to art, and a move towards new media, such as photography, video, computer art, performance art and installations, focusing more on the artists' process. Art of the 1970s was more conceptual, figurative and expressionist. However, the 1980s brought a return to more traditional painting and images.

== Modern Art ==
The term Modern Art in Europe covers roughly the period from the 1860s to the Second World War, and denotes a move away from academic art with its classical mythology themes and stylised landscapes. In Croatia, the change was marked by the Croatia salon (Hrvatski salon) exhibit of 1898 in the new Art Pavilion in Zagreb. One of the prime movers of that exhibition, and in the construction of the Art Pavilion itself was the artist Vlaho Bukovac. Together with Bela Čikoš Sesija, Oton Iveković, Ivan Tišov, Robert Frangeš-Mihanović, Rudolf Valdec and Robert Auer he established a breakaway Croatian Society of Artists, who were to become known as the Zagreb Colourful School (Zagrebačka šarena škola).

This set the scene in the beginning years of the 20th century, for young Croatian artists studying in Munich and Vienna, bringing back the ideas of the new Secessionist movements. Impressionism and post-Impressionism ideas spreading from Paris would also influence the new generation of artists. In sculpture and in painting, new ideas of individual artistic expression were taking hold, leading to a new direction of art in Croatia.

The Academy of Fine Arts in Zagreb was established in 1907, teaching a new generation of Croatian artists modern techniques and ideas.

=== Munich Circle ===
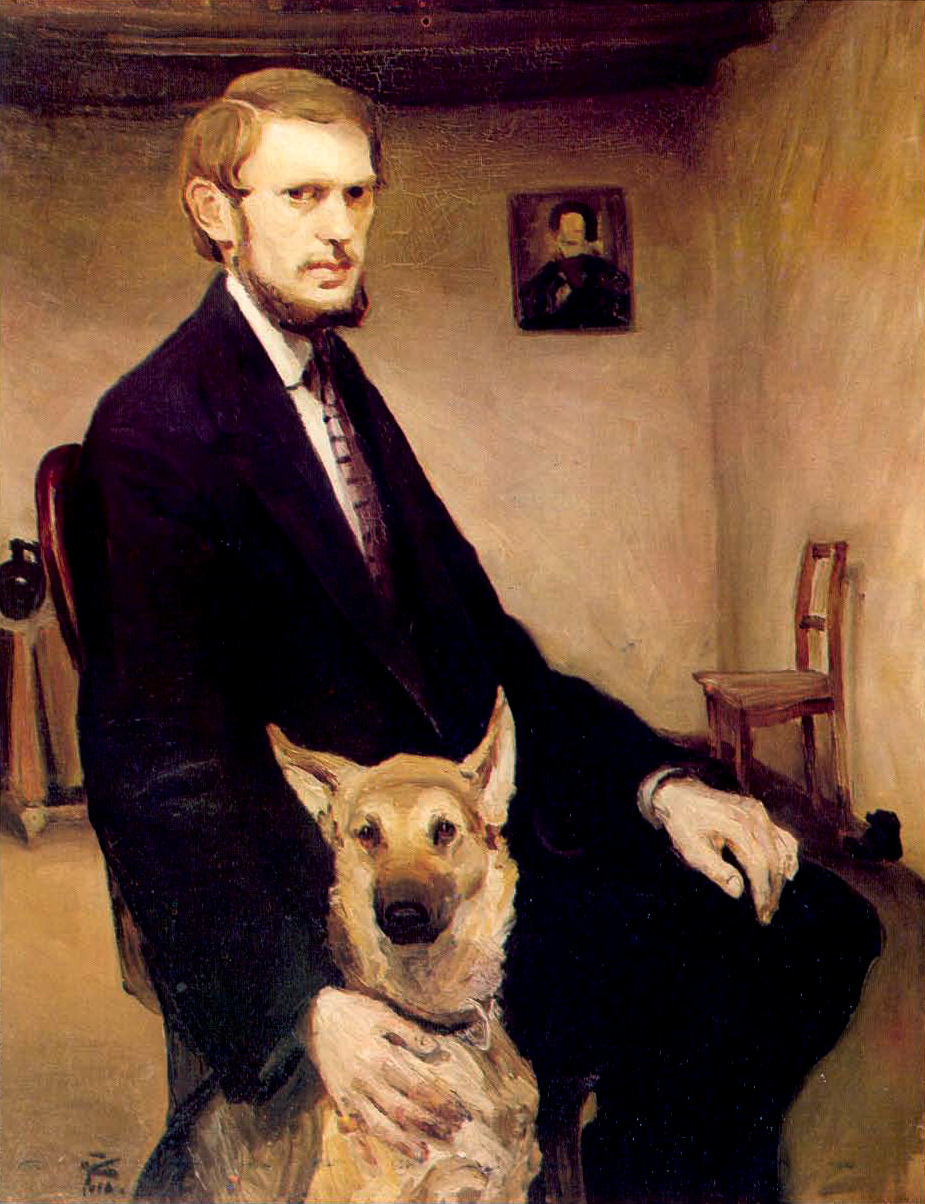
Self-portrait with Dog (Autoportret sa psom) by Miroslav Kraljević (1910) Modern Gallery, Zagreb

Munich Circle (Münchenski krug) is the term given by art historians to a group of Croatian painters at the beginning of the 20th century at the start of Croatian Modernism. The painters were Josip Račić, Miroslav Kraljević, Vladimir Becić, and Oskar Herman. Together they attended the Academy of Fine Arts in Munich, and were at the time known by their classmates as "Die Kroatische Schule" (The Croatian School). Račić and Herman had previously studied with Anton Ažbe at his famous private school in Munich, who insisted on studying the model, plasticity and drawing clear, clean volumes. The Munich painters achieved strong tonal forms in their work by studying the classical painting of Spanish and French masters. Their joint identity of style, with concise artistic expression, without literary, historical or moralistic framework, puts them in direct contact with French impressionism, particularly with Manet and Cézanne as role models. Each of them separately has influenced Croatian Modernism, and together they form an important category in Croatian art. The term "Munich Circle" was coined in the 1950s.

=== Medulić Society ===
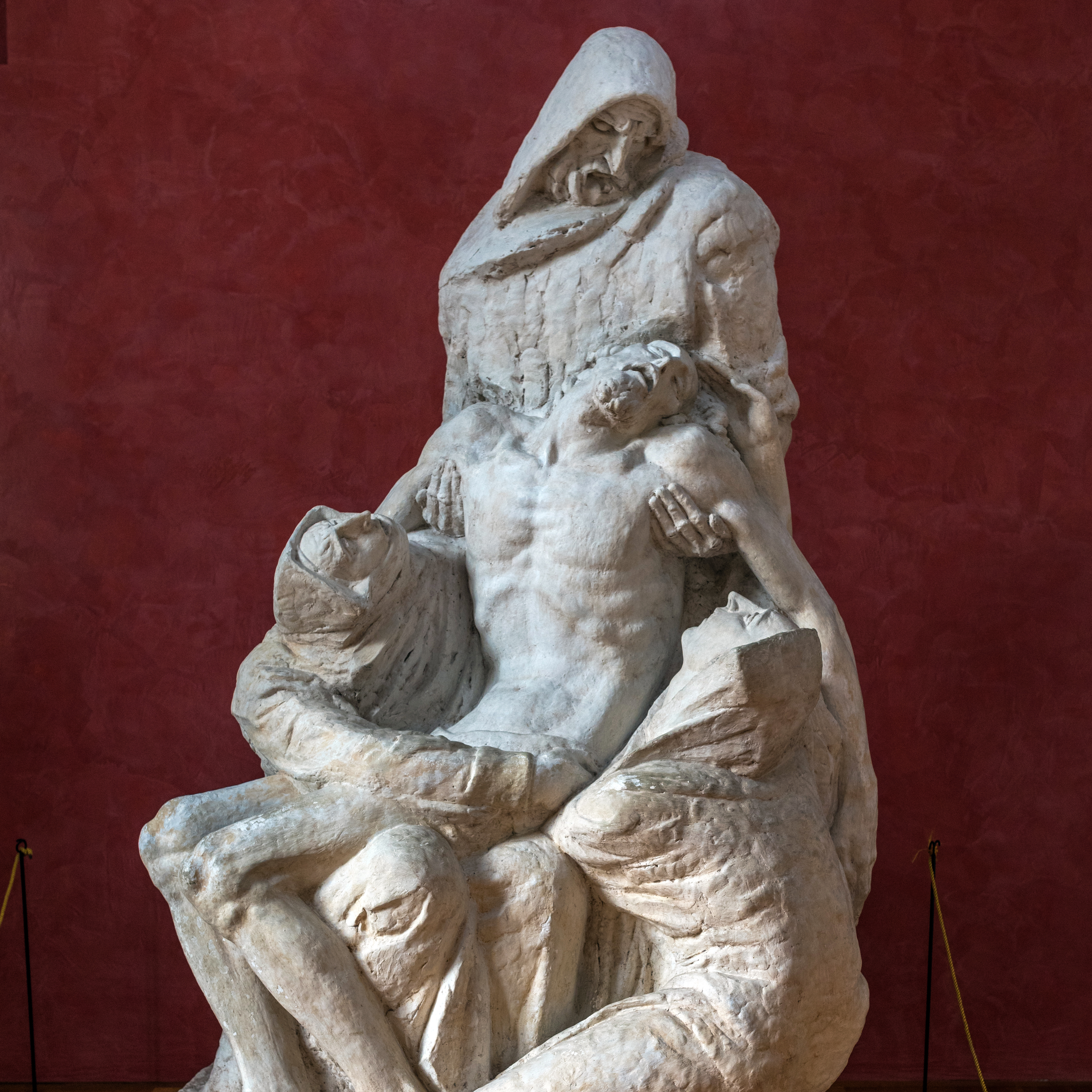
Pietà by Ivan Meštrović, Ivan Meštrović Gallery in Split

In 1908, a breakaway group of young Dalmatian artists in Split, founded the Medulić Society. Led by the artist Emanuel Vidović, they used themes from national legends, poetry and history in their art. Exhibitions were held in Split (1908), Ljubljana (1909), Zagreb (1910), Rome (1911), Belgrade (1912) and Split (1919). The Medulić group had an ideological orientation and an underlying political message. Its aim was not simply to develop a national artistic style, but rather to increase political awareness of the south Slavic identity, and promote the idea of independence from Austria-Hungary.

The Medulić Society's best known representative was the sculptor Ivan Meštrović, who by then was already receiving international recognition for his work. Within Croatia, his best known work includes the powerful "Well of Life", and statues of Grgur Ninski, and Bishop Strossmayer. Other sculptors in the group include Toma Rosandić, Ivo Kerdić (best known for medallions), and Branislav Dešković (known for animal sculptures). Painters in the group included Mirko Rački best known for his powerful illustrations of Dante and his posters, Tomislav Krizman and Jerolim Miše.

Two strong images from the time are "The Austro-Hungarian Monarchy" by Mirko Rački (1916) and "Black Flag" by Ljubo Babić (1919), both portraying the disintegration of the Austro-Hungarian state. Rački used the secessionist decorative style in a powerful statement: a soldier stands to attention against an empty grey field, while behind him sways a black and yellow snake (the colours of the Austrian flag). In Babic's painting, the subject is the funeral of Emperor Francis Joseph portrayed with a large elongated black flag hanging like a guillotine over a company of people dressed in gay, sumptuous colours.

=== Spring Salon ===
During 1916–28, the Spring salon exhibits in Zagreb brought together painters, sculptures and graphical artists. At the first exhibit in the Ulrich Gallery (1916), artists included Ljubo Babić, Jerolim Miše, Tomislav Krizman, Zlatko Šulentić, and sculptors Ferdo Ćus, Hinko Juhn and Joza Turkalj. During the First World War, many artists went abroad, and the salon became the only organized art-related activity at the time. The paintings exhibited showed strong use of form, and restricted colour palettes. The move to flatter forms, in the manner of Cézanne, came in the 1919 Spring Salon exhibition, with the next generation of artists such as the Prague Four (Praška četvorka) Vilko Gecan, Milivoj Uzelac, Marijan Trepše, and Vladimir Varlaj. Expressionism, cubism and secessionism ideas spread, and new directions also came from Đuro Tiljak who had studied with Kandinsky, while Marino Tartaglia bought back the ideas of the Futurists from Rome and Florence. By the 1920s, elements of neoclassicism were creeping in, with its simpler forms.

=== Zenitism ===
The incoming ideas from the rest of Europe were balanced by artists who wanted to integrate the new artistic directions with their native cultural identity. The journal Zenit ('Zenith'), was an avant-garde review of new arts and culture that played a key role in this movement. Founded in 1921 by the Croatian Serb poet and critic Ljubomir Micić and his brother Branko Ve Poljanski, despite criticism and controversy, Zenit continued for 6 years to promote the cause for international modernism consistent with a Yugoslav cultural identity in its issues published in Zagreb and Belgrade.

One of contributors to Zenit was the architect and artist Josip Seissel, who under the pseudonym of Jo Klek is considered to be the first in Croatia (1922) to produce abstract paintings: geometric collages with linguistic motifs and Surrealist compositions.

=== 1930s Classicism and Expressionism ===
By the 1930s, the sculptor Ivan Meštrović, whose work was by then well known internationally, moved into Classicism and encouraged a new "Mediterranean tradition" in his students' art. Other artists of time were Sergej Glumac and Vinko Foretić Sculptor Frano Kršinić created motifs of motherhood and music in marble, while Marin Studin created large works in wood, bronze and stone. Cubist influences can be found in works of Vilko Gecan, Sonja Kovačević Taljević, and surrealism in the works of Krsto Hegedušić, Vanja Radauš, and Antun Motika. On the island of Brač, Ignjat Job painted colourful landscapes in a personal Expressionist style.

=== Motika's Archaic Surrealism ===
In the 1950s, Antun Motika generated a strong reaction from the critics with his exhibition of drawings Archaic Surrealism (Arhajski nadrealizam). The exhibition had a lasting effect on Croatian artistic circles, and is generally considered to be the boldest rejection of the dogmatic frameworks of socialist realism in Croatia. Motika wasn't attached to any particular artistic school or dogma, and loved experimenting. His influence from Picasso, who reportedly praised Motika, is evident especially in his early work, when Motika used both the form principles of neoclassical figuration and synthetic cubism. Motika also had impressionistic and post-impressionistic tendencies, which characterize many of his most noted works. Motika became a professor in Mostar, where he lived and worked from 1929 to 1940. His paintings from the Cycles of Mostar, produced in this period, also left a mark, and are considered "the most radical landscapes from the tradition of mimicry in the field of abstract painting in Croatian modernism."

== Naïve Art ==
Naïve, or primitive art is a distinct segment of the art of the 20th century. In Croatia, naïve art was at first connected with the works of peasants and working men, ordinary men and women, of whom the most successful, over the course of time, became professional artists. Naïve art assumes the work of artists who are more or less self-taught, painters and sculptors with no formal art training, but who have achieved their own creative style and a high level of art. An identifiably individual style and poetic nature distinguishes the Naïve from other "amateur" painters and sculptors, and from the general self-taught artist. The view of a Naïve artist will usually display unusual proportions and perspective, and certain illogicalities of form and space. Such characteristics are the expression of a free creative imagination, in a similar way to other 20th-century art movements such as Symbolism, Expressionism, Cubism, and Surrealism.

In Croatia, Naïve art is also seen as a democratic movement, as the movement proves anyone can create worthwhile art regardless of formal training. Within these art forms various the emotive qualities of works are often more visible than any reigning form of logic or reason. Common themes include: "the joy of life," "forgotten nature," "lost childhood," and "wonder at the world." However, Naïve art does not only reflect positive aspects of life, and dark and tragic themes can also be found within the genre.

Naïve art first appeared in Croatia at the beginning of the 1930s when the Zagreb Art Pavilion showcased an exhibition of the artists' association entitled the Earth group (Grupa Zemlja) on 13 September 1931. Of the artists exhibited, two particularly stood out: Ivan Generalić, who showed three drawings and nine watercolors, and Franjo Mraz, who exhibited three watercolors. The artists sought to show that talent does not only reside in certain social classes or privilege and started the association with naïve art and paintings of villages or by artists from the countryside rather than cities. Themes in Croatian naïve art branched out in the 1950s from villages to "personal classics," which included architectural monuments and objects and opened a period known as "modern primitive art."

=== Earth Group ===
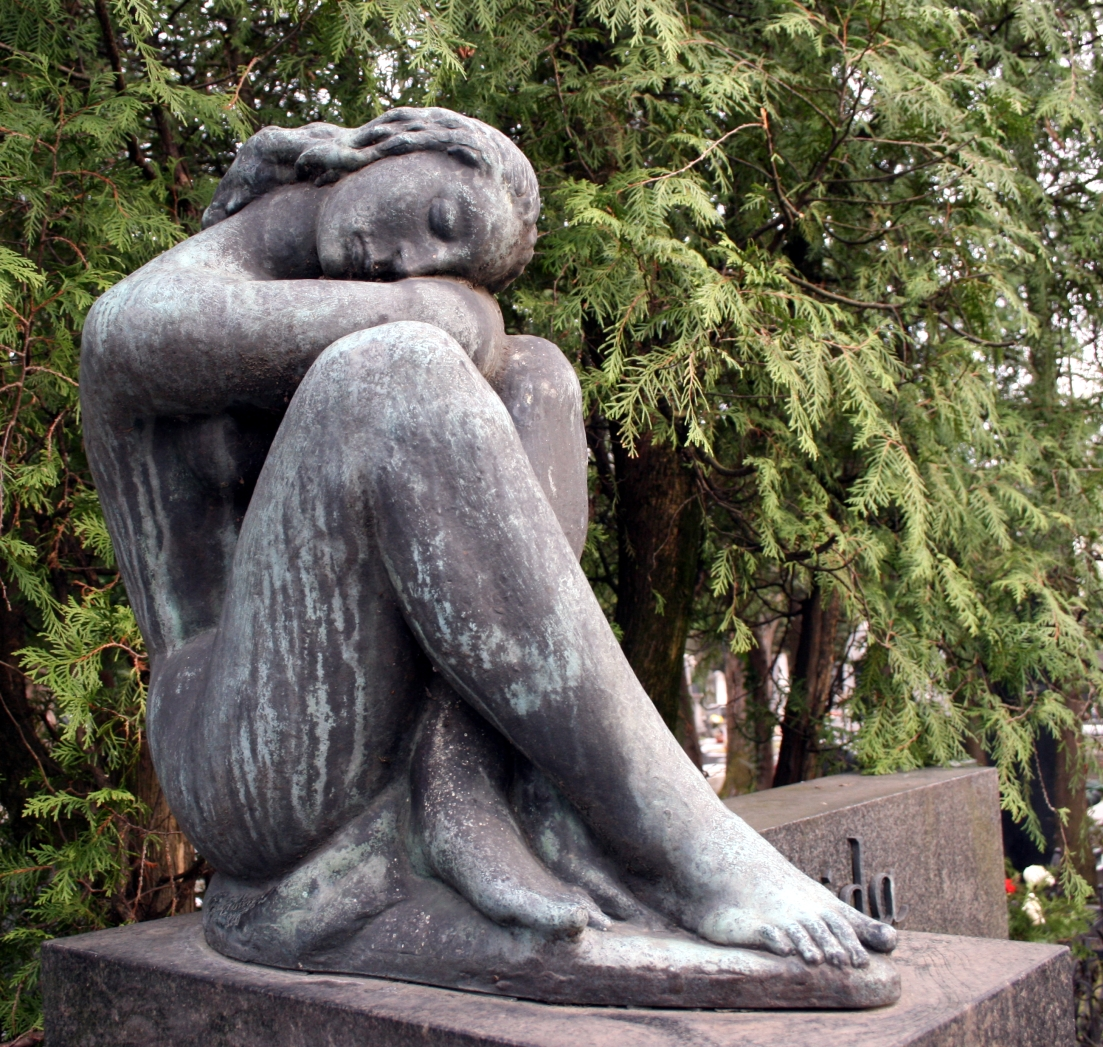
Sculpture by Antun Augustinčić in Mirogoj cemetery, Zagreb

The Earth Group (Grupa Zemlja) were Croatian artists, architects and intellectuals active in Zagreb from 1929 to 1935. The group was Marxist in orientation and was partly modelled on "Neue Sachlichkeit", leading to more stylized forms, and the emergence of Naive painting. The group included the painters Krsto Hegedušić, Edo Kovačević, Omer Mujadžić, Kamilo Ružička, Ivan Tabaković, and Oton Postružnik, the sculptors Antun Augustinčić, Frano Kršinić, and the architect Drago Ibler. The Earth Group searched for answers to social issues. Their program emphasised the importance of independent creative expression, and opposed the uncritical copying of foreign styles. Rather than producing art for art's sake, they felt it ought to reflect the reality of life and the needs of the modern community. Activities at the group's exhibitions were increasingly provocative to the government of the day, and in 1935 the group was banned.

=== Hlebine School ===
The Hlebine School is the term applied to a group of naive painters working in or around the village of Hlebine, near the Hungarian border, from about 1930. The school developed from the encouragement given by Krsto Hegedušić to the young painter Ivan Generalić, whom he met in 1930. Generalić and his friends Franjo Mraz (also a native of Hlebine) and Mirko Virius (from the nearby village of Đelekovec) formed the nucleus of the group. In 1931, they were invited to exhibit with the Earth group, which brought public recognition and naive art became a popular form of artistic expression in Croatia, making a strong social statement about the harshness of rural life. Generalić was the first master of the Hlebine School, and the first to develop a distinctive personal style, achieving a high standard in his art.

After the Second World War, the next generation of Hlebine painters tended to focus more on stylized depictions of country life taken from imagination. Generalić continued to be the dominant figure, and encouraged younger artists, including his son Josip Generalić. By the 1950s the school had become well known internationally, and showed their work at leading exhibitions such as the São Paulo Art Biennial in 1955. The Croatian Museum of Naive Art in Zagreb has a comprehensive display of the works of the Hlebine School and other naive artists.

Some of the best known naive artists are Dragan Gaži, Ivan Generalić, Josip Generalić, Krsto Hegedušić, Mijo Kovačić, Ivan Lacković-Croata, Franjo Mraz, Ivan Večenaj, and Mirko Virius.

== Contemporary Art ==
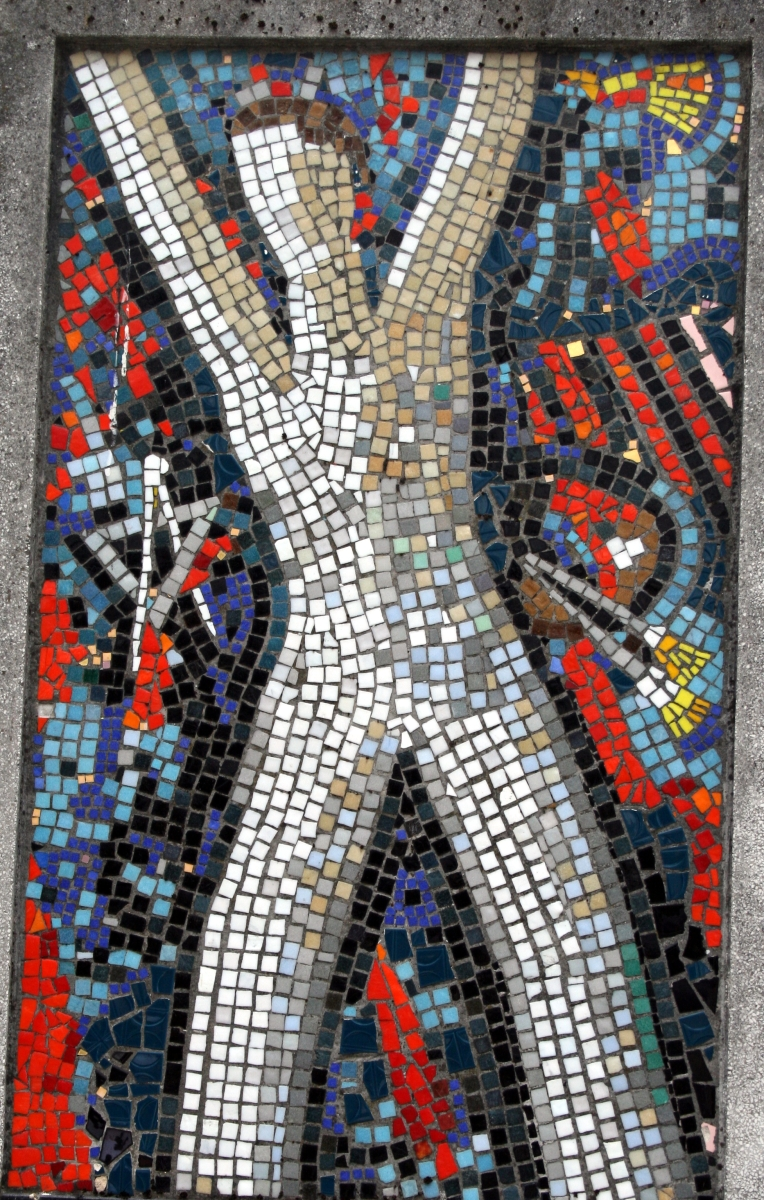
Mosaic by Edo Murtić at Mirogoj, Zagreb

During the Second World War, many artists left the country, while others joined the partisans and worked on applied art such as posters and prints supporting the war effort. In the years immediately following the war, the new communist regime in Yugoslavia brought in the Soviet model of socialist realism and refusal to participate in exhibitions became a popular means of resistance among artists. However, after Tito's break with Stalin and the Soviet Union in 1948, there was a return to more artistic freedom.

Identifying the characteristics of contemporary or postmodern art within Croatia can be hard to specify. Some common features are geometrizing and symbolic-metaphoric paintings, sculptures and installations. Some of the best known contemporary artists are painters Julije Knifer, Edo Murtić, Oton Gliha, and sculptor Ivan Kožarić.

=== EXAT 51 ===
EXAT 51 (the name stands for Experimental Atelier) was a group of artists and architects (1951–56) whose program was geometric abstraction in painting, new ways of handling of space in architecture, and the abolition of the distinction between fine and applied arts. Their ideas owed much to the Russian Constructivist avant-garde and the German Bauhaus experience, and Exat wanted to involve artists in the shaping of the environment with an experimental and creative approach. Members of the group included architects Bernardo Bernardi, Zdravko Bregovac, Zvonimir Radić, Božidar Rašica, Vjenceslav Richter, Vladimir Zarahović, and painters Vlado Kristl, Ivan Picelj, Božidar Rašica, and Aleksandar Srnec.

Exat's first manifesto in 1951 was fiercely attacked by the traditional art establishment. However, an exhibit of paintings by the group in 1952 in Zagreb was well attended, and in that same year, they participated in the VII Salon des Réalités Nouvelles in Paris. In 1953, an exhibition of paintings was held in the Society of Croatian Architects and there the group issued a second manifesto in response to their critics. Other exhibits followed in Belgrade (1953), Rijeka (1954,1956), Dubrovnik (1956) and finally in Belgrade (1956). Under their influence, Croatian artists moved to more creative and personal forms of expression, to surrealism and lyrical abstraction.

EXAT 51 was instrumental in setting up the Zagreb Triennial of Applied Arts, and in establishing a Studio for Industrial Design in 1955. The forerunner of the Museum of Contemporary Art, Zagreb was founded in 1954 as a direct result of their efforts.

=== Gorgona Group ===
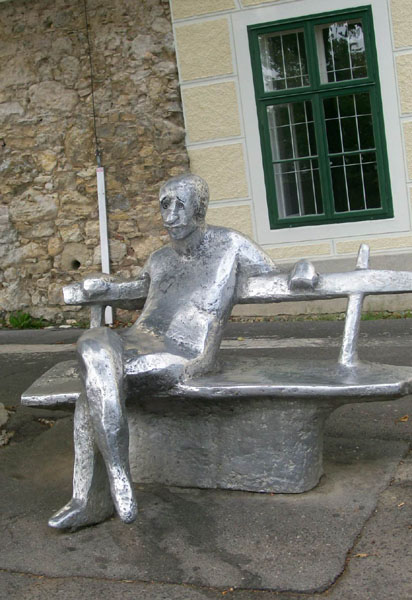
Statue of the writer A.G. Matos by Ivan Kožarić, Zagreb, 1978

Gorgona was a group of artists active in Zagreb between 1959 and 1966, that advocated non-conventional forms of visual art expression. It included the painters Josip Vaništa, Julije Knifer, Marijan Jevšovar, Đuro Seder, sculptor Ivan Kožarić, art theoreticians and critics Radoslav Putar, Matko Meštrović, Dimitrije Bašičević (Mangelos), and architect Miljenko Horvat. Individually they were significant representatives of their own artistic fields, and together they had a major impact on the direction of contemporary art in Croatia. Besides working in more traditional techniques, they pioneered radical forms of artistic expression related to existentialism, neo-dadaism and proto-conceptualism. Their anti-magazine Gorgona (11 issues published 1961–1966) was simply designed, each edition intended to showcase the work and views of a single artist and was in itself a printed work of art. The group was preoccupied by the absurd, sent people invitations for events that never took place, placed ads for the sale of trivial objects, planned unfeasible projects, and even went so far as to exclude the audience to have the whole place for themselves. The Gorgona publication, and the group's activities raised interest in international art circles - and they had frequent contact with such artists as Dieter Roth, Victor Vasarely, Piero Manzoni, Lucio Fontana, and Robert Rauschenberg.

=== New Tendencies ===
Meandar by Julije Knifer

During the period 1961–1973, five international exhibitions were organized under the title New Tendencies. They continued the development of ideas raised by Exat 51 during the 1950s, and formed part of the broader European post-informel art movement in the 1960s and 70s. They were the initiative of art historians and critics Dimitrije Bašičević, Božo Bek, Boris Kelemen, Radoslav Putar, Matko Meštrović and the artists Ivan Picelj, Vjenceslav Richter, Julije Knifer, Aleksandar Srnec, later by a group of younger artists: Juraj Dobrović, Miroslav Šutej, Mladen Galić, Ljerka Šibenik, and Ante Kuduz.

The exhibitions focused mainly on neo-Constructivism, presenting artistic achievements in a wide variety of media, such as computer graphics, conceptual art, performance art and environmental art, as well as an examination of the theory and practice of connecting art with society. The exhibitions were held in a number of museums and galleries across Zagreb presenting the latest work from internationally known artists.

At the first exhibition in 1961, a common theme was the investigation of the relationship between structure and surface, and the beginnings of programmed and kinetic art, a topic that was to be developed further in the following exhibition of 1963. Experiments in visual perception gave a scientific dimension, and by the third exhibition in 1965, artists were examining the relations between cybernetics and art, and events included a symposium on the topic. The 1968/69 exhibition and colloquium dealt further with ideas of information theory and aesthetics, called "Computers & Visual Research". Two new sections appeared at the exhibition of 1973 - one on conceptual art, and another entitled "Canvas". There was also a symposium on "The Rational and the Irrational in Contemporary Art". A 6th New Tendencies exhibition was planned, but never took place. An international symposium was held in 1978, along with an exhibit reviewing the artistic changes of 1966–1978.

Among the most significant works are the sculptures of Vojin Bakić, the reliefs, paintings and graphic books of Juraj Dobrović, and the paintings, sculptures, and mobile graphics of Miroslav Šutej.

=== New Media ===
Between the years 1966 and 1974, the visual arts scene in Croatia expanded, as in the rest of the world, to include new media art. Minimal art, Pop-art and the geometric forms of New Tendencies combined in a new generation of artists characterized by the free spirit of 1968 and ideas about changing the world. They used mass media as a means to express their individual observations and views. Within Croatia, the movement was known as "new art practice", stressing the importance of the artist's part in the process. The very notion of art was called into question, along with its function. Analyzing the concepts of culture, society, politics and economics led to new media as forms of expression such as photography, video, performance art, spatial interventions, and installation art. The works were most frequently conceptual or environmental, and emphasis shifted from aesthetic to ethical principles. By the mid-seventies disillusionment had set in, groups broke up, and some artists left the country.

Among the artists who made most impression in the "new art practice" with individual exhibitions or group actions and urban interventions were Željko Borčić, Boris Bućan, Vlasta Delimar, Slavomir Drinković, Braco Dimitrijević, Ladislav Galeta, Stanka Gjuric, Tomislav Gotovac, Sanja Iveković, Dean Jokanović, Jagoda Kaloper, Željko Kipke, Dalibor Martinis, Marijan Molnar, Goran Petercol, Ante Rašić, Josip Stošić, Davor Tomičić, Goran Trbuljak, Gorki Žuvela, the Group of Six Artists (Vlado Martek, Željko Jerman, Boris Demur, Mladen Stilinović, Sven Stilinović, Fedor Vučemilović), and the Group Flow (Vladimir Gudac, Dubravko Budić, Davor Lončarić, Ivan Šimunović, Gustav Zechel, and Darko Zubčević).

=== Biafra Group ===
Biafra (1970–1978) was a group of Croatian artists that rebelled against the artistic, social and cultural conventions of the day, and engaged with real problems through their art. Individual members ranged in style from pop-art and minimalism to new figuration. The sculptors of the group used new materials in their work, such as polyester, plastic, jute, aluminum, and glass wool, while the painters engaged with imaginative, expressive, rich colors. The content of their art was expressionist, clear and direct. Exhibitions and activities were organized on the streets, presenting their ideas directly to the public. The group originally consisted of the young sculptors Branko Bunić, Stjepan Gračan, Ratko Petrić and Miro Vuco. Membership expanded over the years to include Ivan Lesiak, Zlatko Kauzlarić Atač, Rudolf Labaš, Vlado Jakelić, Stanko Jančić, Ratko Janjić-Jobo, Đurđica Zanoški-Gudlin, and Emil Robert Tanay.

=== New Image, 1980s, and towards the New Millennium ===
At the Art Pavilion in 1981, the Youth Salon showed the work of 12 young painters who presented a return to painting and images. The trend became known as New Image (Nova Slika), and it was also evident at the Gallery of Contemporary Art's exhibition of 'Italian Trans-Avantgarde', showing the works of Italian and Yugoslav artists. New image brought new ways of expression and a new sensitivity towards intimacy and symbolism. The traces of new image can be found in the late 1970s and the early 1980s in Zagreb, and in major exhibitions in New York, London, the Venice Biennale (1980), and the Biennale of young people in Paris 1980. Postmodern trends of the 1980s brought painting back to seemingly more traditional frames. Authors such as Edita Schubert, Nina Ivančić, Star Fio, Đuro Seder, Anto Jerković, and Jelena Perić are characterised by a citation ranging from high to mass media culture.

Inner Dialogue (Unutarnji razgovor) by Đuro Seder, 1991

Furthermore, the 1980s brought a rejection of restrictions, and more varied individual approaches to art and explorations of painting and sculpture appeared. Some concentrated on the meaning and content of the work, while for others the narrative was more important and in conceptual art the medium increasingly defined the work. The avant-garde trends of the previous decades were giving way to a reintroduction of more traditional media in a more personal style, but at the same time, there was a more refined sense of conceptualism - leading to more materialized forms.

Several of the older Croatian artists had already turned again towards painting and more traditional media during the 1970s and the 1980s. For example, the work of Ferdinand Kulmer and Đuro Seder brought significant changes to Croatian painting, and the sculptor Ivan Kožarić reviewed his work in relation to his artistic past. At the same time Dimitrije Bašičević organized the "Confrontations" exhibition which juxtaposed avant-garde and traditional approaches to art and compared their value and significance.

The 1990s was again a time of war, as Croatia gained its independence from the former Yugoslavia. Edo Murtić's "War" cycle stands as powerful, poignant statement, while his large scale paintings of near abstract landscapes, such as his "Montraker" cycle of the 1990s point the way to the future.

== Art Galleries and Museums ==
- Art Pavilion, Zagreb
- Modern Gallery, Zagreb
- Museum of Contemporary Art, Zagreb
- Croatian Museum of Naïve Art, Zagreb
- Museum of Modern Art, Dubrovnik
- Gallery of Fine Arts, Split
- Ivan Meštrović Gallery, Split
- Museum of Modern and Contemporary Art, Rijeka

== See also ==
- Croatian art
- Architecture of Croatia
- Art of Yugoslavia
- History of Croatia
- Culture of Croatia
- Filip Trade Collection
- Sudac Collection
- Vladimir Nazor Award
