= List of Croatian sculptors =

This is a list of notable sculptors from, or associated with, Croatia, in alphabetical order:

== A ==
- Andrija Aleši (1425–1505)
- Kosta Angeli Radovani (1916–2002)
- Antun Augustinčić (1900–1979)

== B ==
- Robert Baća (born 1949)
- Vojin Bakić (1915–1992)
- Lujo Bezeredi (1898–1979)
- Tatiana Bezjak (born 1971)
- Slavko Brill (1900–1943)
- Ivan Budislavić (15th century)
- Andrija Buvina (13th century)

== D ==
- Ante Dabro (born 1938)
- Vera Dajht-Kralj (1928–2014)
- Juraj Dalmatinac/George the Dalmatian (c. 1410–1473)
- Josip Demirović Devj (1939–1999)
- Branislav Dešković (1883–1939)
- Ivan Duknović (c.1440–c.1514)
- Dušan Džamonja (1928–2009)

== F ==
- Ivan Fijolić (born 1976)
- Vera Fischer (1925–2009)
- Robert Frangeš-Mihanović (1872–1940)

== G ==
- Ivo Grbić (1931–2020)

== I ==
- Sanja Iveković (born 1949)

== J ==
- Hinko Juhn (1891–1940)

== K ==
- Ivo Kerdić (1881–1953)
- Albert Kinert (1919–1987)
- Ivan Klapez (born 1961)
- Oja Kodar (born 1941)
- Kuzma Kovačić (born 1952)
- Ivan Kožarić (1921–2020)
- Miroslav Kraljević (1885–1913)
- Frano Kršinić (1897–1982)

== L ==
- Vasko Lipovac (1931–2006)
- Zvonimir Lončarić (1927–2004)

== M ==
- Rudolf Matutinović (1927–2014)
- Ivan Meštrović (1883–1962)
- Ivan Milat-Luketa (1922–2009)

== N ==
- Oscar Nemon (1906–1985)

== P ==
- Ivan Picelj (1924–2011)
- Dimitrije Popović (born 1951)

== R ==
- Vanja Radauš (1906–1975)
- Vjekoslav Vojo Radoičić (1930–2017)
- Radovan (master) (13th century)
- Ivan Rendić (1849–1932)
- Simeon Roksandić (1874–1943)
- Toma Rosandić (1878–1958)
- Branko Ružić (1919–1997)

== S ==
- Ivan Sabolić (1921–1986)
- Stella Skopal (1904–1992)
- Petar Smajić (1910–1985)
- Aleksandar Srnec (1924–2010)
- Marin Studin (1895–1960)

== T ==
- Lavoslav Torti (1875–1942)

== U ==
- Marija Ujević-Galetović (1933–2023)

== V ==
- Maksimilijan Vanka (1889–1963)
- Romolo Venucci (1903–1976)
- Franjo Vranjanin (Laurana) (c. 1430–1502)

== See also ==
- List of painters from Croatia
- List of Croatian artists
- List of Croatian architects
