= Jerolim Miše =

Croatian painter, teacher and art critic

- Born: 25 September 1890; Split, Kingdom of Dalmatia, Austria-Hungary
- Died: 14 September 1970 (aged 79); Split, SR Croatia, SFR Yugoslavia
- Education: Rome, Florence
- Known for: Oil painting, art critic
- Movement: Modern Art

Jerolim Miše (25 September 1890 – 14 September 1970), was a Croatian painter, teacher, and art critic. He painted portraits, still lifes and landscapes of his native Dalmatia. A member of the Group of Three, Group of Four, and the Independent Group of Artists.

In addition to being an exhibiting artist, Jerolim Miše taught and encouraged other artists for over 60 years, wrote articles and critiqued visual arts. As both a painter and a critic, he made an enormous contribution to modern art in Croatia.

== Biography ==
Jerolim Miše was born on 25 September 1890 in Split. He began to study painting at the craft school in Split, then attended the Academy of Fine Arts, Zagreb, but moved to Rome, and finally Florence where he completed his formal training at the Accademia Internazionale. The move to Rome came after an incident where he published criticism of his teacher Menci Clement Crnčić in the paper Zvono.

During his time in Italy (1891–1914), he wrote critiques and reviews of the Italian contemporary arts scene for newspapers and journals back home. He continued to write and publish stimulating articles about the visual arts scene right though his life built up a reputation as an articulate and well informed critic.

On the eve of the First World War, Miše returned to Split. During the war he was conscripted, and afterwards spent a number of years (1917–1937) teaching in schools in Krapina, Slavonski Brod and Zagreb.

His first solo exhibition was held in 1914 in Split, and from 1917 he participated in the exhibitions of the Spring Salon in Zagreb. During the period 1921-1927 he exhibited with the Independent Group of Artists (Grupa nezavisnih umjetnika) whose other members were Ljubo Babić, Vladimir Becić, Jozo Kljaković, Frano Kršinić, Ivan Meštrović, Marin Studin, Zlatko Šulentić and Vladimir Varlaj. In 1928, he was part of the Group of Four (Grupa četvorice) with (Ljubo Babić, Vladimir Becić and Maksimilijan Vanka) and from 1929 the Group of Three (Grupa Trojice) which consisted of himself, Ljubo Babić and Vladimir Becić. He exhibited abroad in group exhibits in Paris (1919) and London (1930).

In 1922 he undertook a study tour of Munich, Berlin and Dresden, where he got to know the work of the old masters, and Cézanne. He visited Paris in 1925 and 1929, events that were crucial in forming his mature artistic style. He painted many portraits, self-portraits and still lifes. He immortalized the landscape of Brač, Šolta, Krk, Korčula and the Dubrovnik region.

In 1937, he went to teach at the Academy of Art in Belgrade, until 1943 when he moved to the Academy of Fine Arts, Zagreb where he worked until his retirement in 1961.

Jerolim Miše died on 14 September 1970 in Split.

== Legacy ==
While studying in Rome and Florence, Miše was more interested in art theory than practice, spending time with the Rome avant-garde circle, questioning issues such as Viennese secession as opposed to Italian futurism and post-cubist trends. There, he also spent time with fellow Split native Ivan Meštrović. However, Miše’s painting from that period do not show the influence of Art Nouveau secessionist linearism nor heroic mythology. His motifs are simple, the content minimalist.

Miše's early work consisted mainly of portraits, but he later developed into a landscape painter, and finally began to paint everything he saw: views, landscapes, portraits, still lifes, animals. His later landscapes of his native Dalmatia capture an experience of the colour and atmosphere. Miše went to Paris for the first time in 1925, and according to the painter himself, that is when his “reorientation” started. For his retrospective exhibition in 1955 at the Modern Gallery, Zagreb, he wrote: "I started with the Secession and I was already thirty-two when I came into contact with van Gogh, Renoir and Cézanne".

In 1928, for the first time he spent a long period in Supetar on the island of Brač where he painted a series of views of the town with its empty streets in the summer heat and a number of landscapes and seascapes that are expressive colourist works reminiscent of Cézanne’s and Renoir’s painting styles. In his work can be identified contacts with contemporary German and French art styles. The art historian and curator, Igor Zidić summarized the conflicting styles in Miše's work "...the struggle between the hard, clear volumes of secessionist art, and the vibrating surfaces of impressionism... he is wrestling between the (German) fascination with the subject and the (French) obsession with light."

== Works ==
- Self-portrait (Autoportret), 1916
- Portrait of a Bride (Portret zaručnice)
- Girl with Melon (Djevojku s dinjom)
- Portrait of Ivo Tartaglia (Portret Ive Tartaglie), 1919
- Seascape, Supetar (Primorsku vedutu, Supetar)
- Noon in Supetar, (Podne u Supetaru) 1928
- Portrait of the Painter Rački (Portret slikara Račkog), 1929
- Red House (Crvene kuće), 1930
- Noon in Koločep (Podne u Koločepu), 1931
- Young Girl (Djevojčica), 1932
- Grouper (Škarpina), 1934
- May Morning on Lopud (Majsko jutro na Lopudu)
- Still life with brushes (Mrtva priroda s kistovima), 1961

== Exhibitions ==
=== Solo shows ===
During his lifetime, Miše held solo exhibits in Split, Slavonski Brod, Rijeka, Zadar, Zagreb and Belgrade. Selected recent solo exhibitions include

- 2008 Jerolim Miše - Gallery Adris, Rovinj
- 1990 Jerolim Miše - Art Pavilion, Zagreb
- 1970 Jerolim Miše Retrospective - Gallery of Fine Arts, Split

=== Group shows ===
Selected recent group exhibitions include

- 2006 Croatian Collection - Museum of Contemporary Art, Skopje

=== Public collections ===
Jerolim Miše's work can be found in the following public collections

Croatia

- Gallery of Fine Arts, Split (Galerija Umjetnina) Split
- Museum of Contemporary Art, Zagreb (Muzej Suvremene Umjetnosti)
- Modern Gallery, Zagreb (Galerija Moderna)

Macedonia (F.Y.R.M.)

- Museum of Contemporary Art, Skopje
