= Zlatko Šulentić =

Croatian painter

- Born: 16 March 1893; Glina, Kingdom of Croatia-Slavonia, Austria-Hungary
- Died: 9 July 1971 (aged 78); Zagreb, SR Croatia, SFR Yugoslavia
- Education: Academy of Fine Arts, Munich
- Known for: Oil painting, graphic art
- Movement: secessionism, expressionism

Zlatko Šulentić (16 March 1893 – 9 July 1971) was a Croatian painter of landscapes and portraits.

He was one of the second generation of Croatian modern painters, a follower of the Munich Circle painters. He also studied at the Academy of Fine Arts, Munich, and began to develop his own version of expressionism and cubism in Croatia, with refined colour harmonies. In his later work Šulentić painted religious motifs, landscapes and city views, but he remained foremost a portrait painter. He taught drawing in school and at the Academy of Fine Arts, Zagreb. He travelled extensively, and published a book "People, Places, Infinity" (Ljudi, krajevi, beskraj).

== Biography ==
Zlatko Šulentić was born 16 March 1893 in Glina. When he was three years old, his mother died. In later years he would tell his wife that she lived in his memory "like a shadow sitting with him on the couch." He attended high-school at Karlovac, then in 1910 took classes given by Robert Auer at the Provisional School for Arts and Crafts in Zagreb. His training continued in Munich, firstly private lessons with Heinrich Knirr, then at the Academy of Fine Arts, Munich (1911–1914). While still a student, in 1913 he visited Paris.

Šulentić exhibited for the first time at the inaugural Zagreb Spring Salon of 1916, when he was one of the organizers. During the period 1921-1927 he exhibited with the Independent Group of Artists (Grupa nezavisnih umjetnika) whose other members were Ljubo Babić, Vladimir Becić, Jozo Kljaković, Frano Kršinić, Ivan Meštrović, Jerolim Miše, Marin Studin and Vladimir Varlaj. He also held solo exhibits in Gallery Ulrich in 1921, 1927, and 1941.

From an early age, he travelled extensively, initially in the company of his father, a physician. He travelled within Croatia: around Glina and Karlovac, Zagreb, Japetić, Plešivica and the Adriatic coast, and later Šulentić would visit most European countries, across North Africa, North America, South America, Burma, Indonesia, Malaysia and Egypt. Impressions from these trips were recorded in sketches and watercolors, with a series of notes which were later published in his book "People, Places, Infinity" (1971).

Šulentić taught life drawing in school, and later became a professor at the Academy of Fine Arts, Zagreb. In 1947, due to the politics of the time, his position at the Academy was terminated. At the age of 54, he found himself retired on a small pension at a time when there was limited opportunity to exhibit and earn a living from art. Šulentić devoted his time to painting, and in 1953 resumed his travels. By 1959, he began to receive recognition for his work in major Croatian exhibitions. In 1961 he was decorated with the Order of the Republic. The Rijeka Museum of Modern Art held an exhibition marking his 70th anniversary, and other galleries followed: Zorin Dom, Karlovac, Strossmayer Galleries in Zagreb, Art Salon in Osijek, Gallery of Fine Arts in Split, and Matica hrvatska.

From 1964 to 1968 Šulentić worked for the Franciscan monastery at Ksaver in Zagreb. His picture of the "Sermon on the Mount" (Propovijedi na gori) includes his last self-portrait.

In 1969 he received the Vladimir Nazor Award for lifetime achievement in the visual arts.

Zlatko Šulentić died in Zagreb on 9 July 1971.

== Legacy ==
Šulentić is one of the best-known Croatian expressionists. A crucial early influence was the paintings of Miroslav Kraljević and the modern art movement. Public appreciation of his own paintings dates from 1916, the first Spring Salon in Zagreb. His pictures featured the lively colour and expressionism so often present in his later work. He strove for spiritual content in his painting, saying that he wanted to know what was behind the reality.

Throughout his artistic career, landscapes, still lifes, portraits, and religious compositions bore his personal artistic signature of graded tones and colours with free line-work. This was evident in his gouaches, watercolors, oils, and drawings. In 1930 on a trip to Paris, he painted one of his best pictures "Place de Tertre", using a limited colour palette, and creating a modern sense of space.

In the 1950s and 1960s he painted his summer travel series (Zadar, Vrbnik, Kvarner, Šipan). The use of expressive colour tending towards abstractionism put him among the ranks of the best contemporary Croatian artists.

Šulentić was an important figure of the second generation of Croatian Modernism, the creator of a series of iconic works in his own signature style. He was also a contemporary artist. At the end of the sixties he was a master of expressive colour and portrayed in-depth content in human, painterly gestures.

A major retrospective of his work was held at the Modern Gallery, Zagreb in 1972, and at the Art Pavilion in 2011.

In 1993, on the centenary of his birth, Croatian Post issued a stamp featuring his self-portrait of 1929.

== Works ==
His paintings include

- Late Autumn (Kasna Jesen), 1913
- Autoportret, 1915
- Iz Maksimira, 1915
- Man with a Red Beard (Čovjek s crvenom bradom), 1916
- Portret dr Stjepana Pelca, 1917
- Primorska Street (Primorska ulica), 1918
- Tunis, 1920
- My Father (Moj otac), 1925
- Portret arh. Pičmana, 1926
- Self-Portrait (Autoportret), 1929
- Place du Tertre, 1930
- Banka, 1932
- Girl with Hat (Djevojčica sa šeširom), 1934
- S. Giovanni i Paolo, Venecija, 1935
- Sambor Landscape (Samoborski kraj), 1938
- Podne, 1939
- Portret Andreje Wendler-Vojta, 1946
- Vrbnik, 1947
- Sv. Donat, 1949
- Behind the Theatre I (Iza kazališta I), 1952
- Fontana di Trevi, 1957
- Anthony (Ante), 1958
- View from đipan (Pogled sa đipana), 1962
- Đipan Fields (Đipansko polje), 1962
- Self-portrait (Autoportret), 1963
- Sto stuba, 1964
- Plješivički vinogradi II, 1966
- Staru svjetiljku, 1966
- Đipanski bor, 1967
- Ampirsku uru, 1968
- Silba, 1968
- Napuštena barka, 1969
- Dijete, 1970
- Raspeće, 1971

== Exhibitions ==
During his lifetime, Šulentić exhibited his work in solo and group shows, most notably in the Zagreb Spring Salon from 1916, and with the Independent Group of Artists in the 1920s.

=== Solo exhibitions ===
Recent exhibitions of his work include:

- 2011 Retrospective Exhibition, Art Pavilion, Zagreb
- 2010 Drawings of Zlatko Šulentić, Galerija Ulrich, Zagreb
- 2006 Zlatko Šulentić: Indirect Portrait, Adris Gallery, Rovinj
- 1969 Strossmayer Gallery, Zagreb

=== Group exhibitions ===
- 2006 Croatian Collection – Museum of Contemporary Art Skopje, Skopje

=== Public collections ===
His work can be found in the following public collections

- Museum of Contemporary Art, Zagreb, Croatia
- Modern Gallery, Zagreb, Croatia
- Strossmayer Gallery of Old Masters, Zagreb
- Museum of Contemporary Art, Belgrade, Serbia
- Museum of Contemporary Art, Skopje, Macedonia

== Bibliography ==
- Zlatko Šulentić by Mladen Pejaković. Monografija. Publisher:Art studio Azinović; ISBN 978-953-6271-70-2
- Zlatko Šulentić – Tragom onostranog i svetog (Zlatko Šulentić – On the Trail of the Transcendental and the Sacred) by Ivanka Reberski. Monografija. Publisher: Požeška biskupija, 2009. ISBN 978-953-7647-04-9
