= Šulentić =

Šulentić, or Sulentic, is a Croatian surname. Notable people with the surname include:

- Ive Sulentic (born 1979), Canadian soccer player
- Zlatko Šulentić (1893–1971), Croatian painter
