= Nina Ivančić =

Croatian artist

Nina Ivančić (born in 1953 in Zagreb, Croatia) is a contemporary Croatian artist working mainly in the mediums of painting and drawing.

== Background ==
Nina Ivančić, daughter of Ljubo Ivančić, the famous Croatian painter and member of the artist group, "Group of 5", studied at the University of Zagreb Academy of Fine Arts under Professor Šime Perić. She is one of the key figures of the New Image painting movement which emerged during the 1981 Youth Salon which signalled a return to painting in the then Yugoslavian art. Key members of the New Image movement also include: Star Fio and Đuro Seder. Her works from the 1980s approach geometric abstraction and were made during her stay in New York (1986–1993). She is particularly known for her works from the 1990s where she used ships and airplanes as leitmotifs to explore the relationship of painting to art and technology in today's society which is reliant on modern medias.

Since becoming an assistant professor in 1999, she has been teaching painting in the Department of Painting at the Academy of Fine Arts, University of Split. She has participated in numerous solo and group exhibitions in Croatia and abroad, including the Youth Biennale in Paris (1982) and the Venice Biennale (1986, 1995). Ivančić has also had two retrospective exhibitions: Paintings, at the Zuccato Gallery (Poreč, 2005) and Nina Ivančić, in the Klovićevi dvori Gallery (Zagreb, 2006). She has received many awards, of particular interest are the prestigious Binney and Smith Inc. Fine Art Achievement Award (New York, 1987) and the Josip Račić Award – Vjesnik newspaper award for fine arts (Zagreb, 2003).

== Bibliography ==
- Dević, Ana, – Nina Ivančić: Jet-sets, (exh. cat, Moderna Galerija, 2001).
- Medić, Ana – Nina Ivančić: 1980-2006, (exh. cat, Klovićevi Dvori, 2006).
