= Zvonimir Lončarić =

Croatian sculptor, painter and animated film artist

- Born: 13 March 1927; Zagreb, Kingdom of Yugoslavia
- Died: 11 November 2004 (aged 77); Zagreb, Croatia
- Known for: Painting, sculpture

Zvonimir Lončarić (13 March 1927 – 11 November 2004) was a Croatian sculptor and painter.

In 1955, he graduated from the Academy of Applied Arts at the University of Zagreb. Between 1958 and 1978, Lončarić directed four animated films for Zagreb Film, and was also the art director of 19 animated and feature films, among them Surogat, Dušan Vukotić's 1961 Academy Award-winning animated short.
