= Mirko Rački =

Croatian painter (1879–1982)

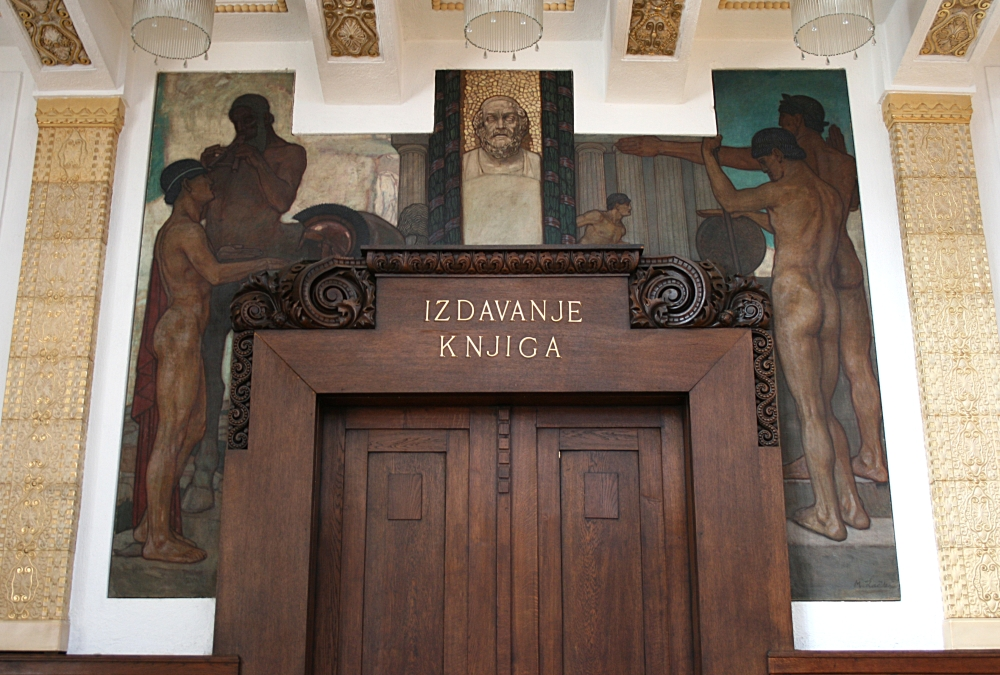
Mirko Rački, Mural in Croatian State Archives building

Mirko Rački (13 October 1879 – 21 August 1982) was a Croatian painter.

Rački was born in Novi Marof, and graduated from the Teacher's Academy in Zagreb. He then went to the private art school of Heinrich Strehblow in Vienna, then studied at the Academy in Prague under Vlaho Bukovac and in Vienna under W. Unger. He lived in Munich from 1907 to 1914, then in Rome, Geneva, Zagreb, and finally in Split.

His most productive period was when he lived outside Croatia, but he was in permanent contact with Croatian artists (Izidor Kršnjavi and Ivan Meštrović), and during those times he worked in the spirit of the Vienna Secession. In 1941 Rački was admitted into the Croatian Academy of Sciences and Arts.

Rački's most important collection of work is connected to Dante's The Divine Comedy and he was occupied with these motifs until the end of his life.

Some his works were published in the collector's edition of The Divine Comedy from 1934 in Bergamo. A retrospective exhibition was held in 1970 in Zagreb.
