= Vladimir Becić =

Croatian painter (1886–1954)

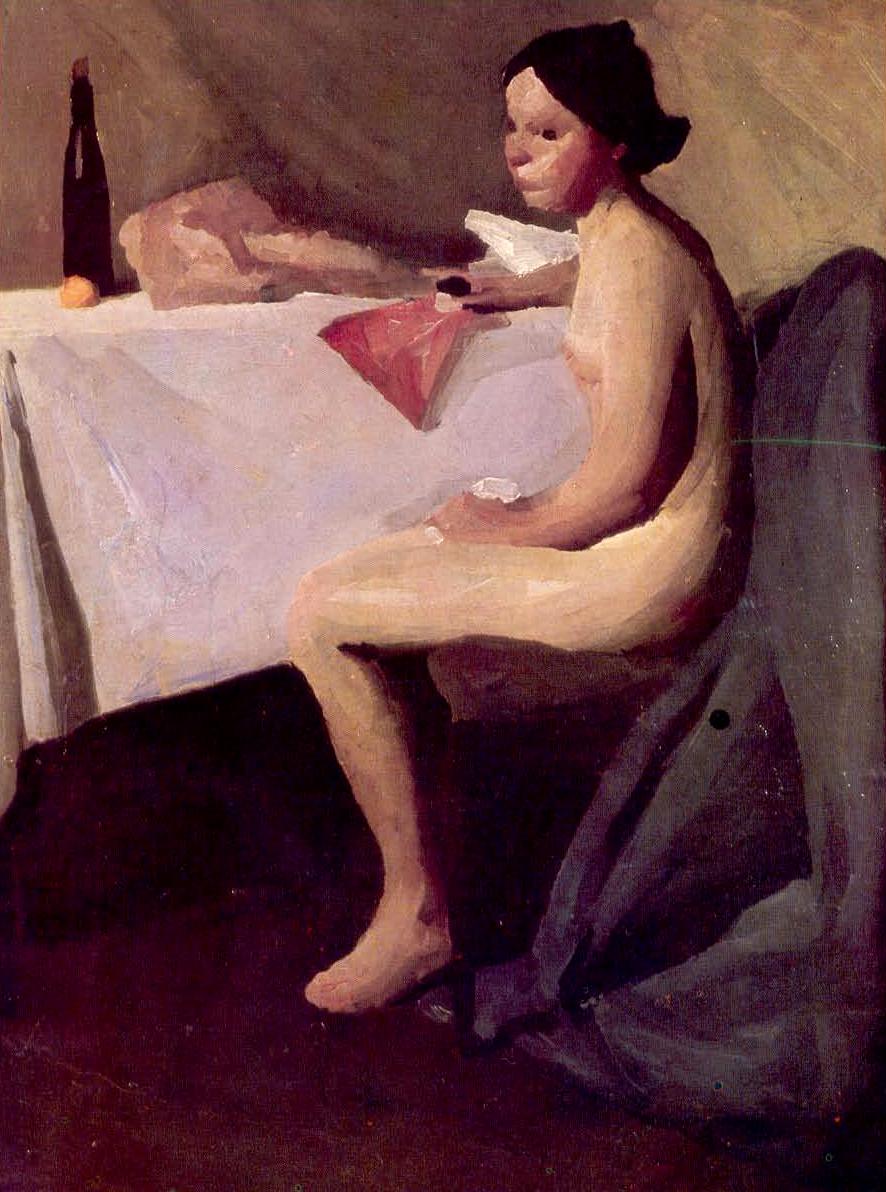
- Akt djevojke kod stola (Girl Nude at a Table) by Vladimir Becić, 1907. oil on canvas 61.4x46.5 cm, Modern Gallery, Zagreb
- Born: 1 June 1886; Slavonski Brod, Kingdom of Croatia-Slavonia, Austria-Hungary
- Died: 24 May 1954 (aged 67); Zagreb, PR Croatia, FPR Yugoslavia
- Education: Munich under Hugo von Habermann, Paris
- Known for: Painting
- Notable work: paintings (oils and watercolours), drawings, prints
- Movement: Modern

Vladimir Becić (1886–1954) was a Croatian painter, best known for his early work in Munich, which had a strong influence on the direction of modern art in Croatia.

Becić studied painting in Munich at the prestigious Academy of Arts along with Oskar Herman, Miroslav Kraljević and Josip Račić. This group of Croatian artists are known as the Munich Circle or Munich Four, and are very important figures in Croatian art of the 20th century. After Munich, Becić spent 2 years studying and working in Paris before returning to Zagreb in 1910.

During the First World War, Vladimir Becić worked as a war artist on the Salonika front producing a series of images of the soldiers and wounded. Following the end of the war, he spent time in a village near Sarajevo, where he painted landscapes and rural subjects in a style that used colour and tonal variations to depict form and space.

Becić was a professor at the Academy of Fine Arts in Zagreb (1924–1947), and a member of the Croatian Academy of Sciences and Arts from 1934.

== Biography ==
Vladimir Becić was born in Slavonski Brod on 1 June 1886.

He initially studied law in Zagreb and attended the private art school of Menci Clement Crnčić and Bela Čikoš Sesija. In 1905, he gave up his law studies for art, moving to Munich, where he first studied with Heinrich Knirr, and then at the Academy of Arts. In 1909, he went to Paris where he enrolled in the Academy La Grande Chaumiére and worked as a draftsman at the magazine Le Rire. He returned to Zagreb in 1910, where he staged his first solo exhibit.

He exhibited his artworks as a part of the Kingdom of Serbia's pavilion at the International Exhibition of Art of 1911.

Becić then worked in Osijek, Belgrade and Bitolj. He joined the Serbian army shortly before the outbreak of the First World War. He was then a war correspondent and artist for the magazine "L'Illustration" on the Salonika front, creating a series of images of the soldiers and the wounded. In 1919, he held his second solo exhibit, also in Zagreb.

From 1919 to 1923, Vladimir Becić lived and worked in the village of Blažuj near Sarajevo, producing a series of oils and watercolours of landscapes, peasants and shepherds that show an increasingly mature style of tonal painting using colour forms for rounded volume and space. He then moved back to Zagreb, where he taught at the Academy of Fine Arts (Croatian: Akademija likovnih umjetnosti) (1924–1947).

In 1930, Vladimir Becić, together with Ljubo Babić and Jerolim Miše formed "Group Three" (Grupa trojice).

Becić became a member of the Croatian Academy of Sciences and Arts in 1934, at that time called the Yugoslav Academy of Sciences and Art.

Vladimir Becić died in Zagreb on 24 May 1954.

== Legacy ==
The beginnings of modernity in Croatian art are primarily linked to the Munich Cycle of painters, some of whose key works are housed in the Museum of Contemporary Art collection. These include oil paintings by Vladimir Becic dating back to the period 1910–1922, the most important phase in his artistic career, including works from the early 40s.

Vladimir Becić's earliest works date from the time of the Munich school, and together with the works of Josip Račić and Miroslav Kraljević, they point to a new direction in Croatian modern painting. Moving away from traditional academic styles, they are strongly influenced by Leibl's realism, and the works of Impressionist artists such as Manet, whose work they saw in an exhibit of 1907. Other influences at that time were Velázquez and Goya. Becić's later works show an approach that is closer to Cézanne, and emphasizing the structure and geometric shapes. His artistic expression was focused towards modeling and clarity. His sketches in oil, and especially watercolour, express the freshness of the immediate experience. He uses rich colour expression, and tone shaping for strong volume.

Some insights into Vladimir Becić can be derived from his self-portraits, which he painted from his youngest days until just before his death. They are especially remarkable as they cover his time in Munich, then Paris and finally Osijek. Compared to the contemporary self-portraits of Joseph Racic and Miroslav Kraljevic, the Becic self-portraits are simpler, but show a full and complete expression. His early paintings, above all, show an accurate observation of form, subject and body and their spatial relationships rendered by a trained and skilful hand. The style of his later work owes something to the widespread tendency in Europe to return to nature in all things cultural and artistic after the First World War, and the influence of post-cubism - emphasizing the importance of construction. For Becić, nature was not a shelter, but an incentive, a great teacher of life, order, and organization.

According to Miroslav Krleža, Becić holds a deservedly high place in the history of Croatian modern art. Measured with Račić and Kraljević, he is not simply one of three, but is completely different.

In 2006, the Croatian Post Office issued a set of stamps depicting Croatian art, one of which was Becić's Still Life of 1909.

== Works ==
- Guslar (Guslac) 1906
- Nude Study (Studija Akta) 1906
- Woman Nude in Front of Mirror (Ženski Akt pred ogledalom) 1906
- Oak (Hrast) 1907
- Nude Girl at a Table (Akt djevojcica kod stola) 1907
- Nude with Newspaper (Ženski akt s novinama) 1907
- Nude in Front of Mirror (Akt pred ogledalom) 1908
- Girl with Doll (Djevojčica s lutkom) 1908
- Portrait of Miroslav Kraljević (Portret Miroslava Kraljevića) 1908
- Self-portrait with Hat (Autoportret sa polucilindrom) 1908
- Still Life (Mrtva Priroda) 1909
- Watermelons (Lubenice) 1911
- Hill Landscape with Stream (Planinski pejzaž s potokom) 1923
- Vera 1926
- Peasant Woman (Saljanka) 1926
- Fisherman (Ribar) 1932
- Girl with Flower (Djevojka s cvijecem) 1933
- Small Meadows (Male sjenokoše) 1934
- Boy with Corn (Dječak s kukuruzom) 1935
- Crabs (Rakovi) 1936
- Ragotin 1937
- Tovarenje ugljena, 1938
- Samoborski pejsaž, 1941.

== Exhibitions ==
=== Solo shows ===
- 1910 in Zagreb
- 1919 in Zagreb
- 1984 Vladimir Becic - Umjetnicki paviljon / Art Pavilion Zagreb, Zagreb
- 2005 Adris Gallery, Rovinj Vladimir Becić, Svjedok Istine Postojanja

=== Group shows ===
- 1973 Paintings of the Munich Circle - Umjetnicki paviljon / Art Pavilion Zagreb, Zagreb
- 2007 Iz fundusa galerije - Museum of Modern Art Dubrovnik, Dubrovnik
- 2008 From the holdings of the museum - Museum of Modern Art Dubrovnik, Dubrovnik

=== Dealers ===
- Galerija Kaptol, Zagreb Croatia

=== Public collections ===
- Museum of Modern Art Dubrovnik, Dubrovnik, Croatia
- Gallery of Fine Arts / Galerija likovnih umjetnosti, Osijek, Osijek, Croatia
- MMSU - Museum of Modern and Contemporary Art Rijeka, Rijeka, Croatia
- Galerija Umjetnina Split, Split, Croatia
- MSU Muzej Suvremene Umjetnosti / Museum of Contemporary Art, Zagreb, Croatia

=== Online gallery ===
Online gallery of paintings at Gallery Adris
