= Josip Demirović Devj =

Croatian painter and sculptor

Josip Demirović Devj (5 February 1939, in Stari Bar, Montenegro – 23 December 1999, in Zagreb, Croatia) was a Croatian painter and sculptor.

The artist introduced himself to Zagreb in the early 1960s as the first pop artist in the former Yugoslavia. He graduated from the School of Applied Arts and Design in Zagreb, and assisted in Krsto Hegedušić's masters workshop. In his early years, Josip Demirović Devj had solo exhibitions in Zagreb, Dubrovnik, and Sutomore, and later began exhibiting unconventionally, in alternative venues such as bookstores, libraries and grocery stores. In the mid eighties, he organized an exhibition with the happening in the center of Zagreb. In 1987 he exhibited a huge painting "Gloria" on the walls of the office tower Zagrepčanka. It was the largest painting in the world (length 101 meters with the surface of 777 square meters) and he hung it on the skyscraper to mark the birth of the five-billionth person in the world. He has exhibited in the Zagreb Art Pavilion, and some of his works are currently on display at the Museum of Contemporary Art in Zagreb.

In accordance with the program guidelines of his painting and sculptural research, he also created poetic texts and examined the possibilities of contemporary music with experimental compositions for organ, piano and cello. The entire body of his work is marked by Neo-Dada interventions.

== English translation of references ==
1. Kratke vijisti (Google translation)
