= Antun Motika =

Croatian artist

- Born: Antun Motika; 30 December 1902; Pula, Austria-Hungary (now Croatia)
- Died: 13 February 1992 (aged 89); Zagreb, Croatia
- Known for: Painting

Antun Motika (30 December 1902 – 13 February 1992) was a Croatian artist. He was an innovative artist, not attached to any particular artistic school or tendency. Motika was a prolific painter, who left behind a great legacy.

Although he occasionally painted with oil on canvas, he generally preferred watercolor or gouache, whose application he preceded with a series of preparatory drawings in pencil or charcoal. From 1941 until his retirement in 1961, he worked at the School of Applied Arts in Zagreb, where he taught various courses. His paintings from the Cycles of Mostar are considered the most radical abstract landscapes in Croatian modernism. Motika's exhibition Archaic Surrealism (1952), produced a strong reaction among Croatian critics, and is considered "the boldest rejection of the dogmatic framework of socialist realism." The exhibition has become the main topic of theoretical and ideological discussion among Croatian critics.

== Biography ==
Motika was one of four children of Anka (Ana), originally from Bakar, who was from a family of sailors, and Antun Motika, who was from Motiki, near Orbanići, Marčana. His father was born into a family of farmers.

He attended schools in Pula, Zminj, Pazin and Sušak, where he graduated in 1921. He studied sculpture at the Royal Academy of Art and Crafts with R. Valdec in Zagreb, only to eventually switch to painting, graduating in 1926. Motika was fluent in Italian.

From the artist's early period, his works reveal "artistic talent and a tendency to examine multiple artistic disciplines." Thanks to his academic studies, focused on modeling and volume, he acquired assuredness in drawing and compositional freedom. From 1929 to 1930, he drew caricatures for the Zagreb satirical newspaper Koprive (initially he signed himself under the pseudonym Lopata). Motika made use of the form principles of neoclassical figuration as well as synthetic cubism.

He became a professor in Mostar, where he lived and painted from 1929 to 1940 (the so-called "Mostar period"). His sojourns in Paris in 1930 and 1935 were crucial for his artistic development, enabling him, after post-academic research and perturbations, "to base figurative expression on abstraction and minimalization of the visible world, and to devote himself exclusively to personal figurative expression" (so-called "post-impressionistic intimism"). After Paris, Motika is said to have opted for "a distinctive version of post-impressionist impressionism." He assimilated Pierre Bonnard's lyricism and Raoul Dufy's coloristic vibration. Simply put, before Paris, Motika's paintings are generally dark, after Paris the paintings are overtaken by light.

Until the second half of the 1950s, his painting is dominated by a harmonious rhythm of colors and strokes, sometimes accompanied by arabesque lines (the so-called "stenogrammatic approach") and unfilled white surfaces. Motika is said to have "built his paintings with brush strokes and subtly harmonized tonal values, with the drawing only being perceived as an arabesque, which was expressed in numerous interiors, portraits, erotic scenes, city views and landscapes."

He drew his favorite motifs and themes (interiors, still lifes with open windows, nudes, female portraits, views) from his immediate surroundings. His systematic studies, personal poetics and lyrical vocation led to the creation of the Cycles of Mostar landscapes. Here, "the attachment to pure light is expressed, and at the same time they are one of the most radical appearances from the mimetic tradition to the field of abstract painting in Croatian modernism."

In Mostar, Motika created works with a specific lyrical atmosphere, full of light and "saturated tonal atmosphere." The Mostar period is dominated by the painting medium, marked as it is by transparency and bright chromatics, research with subdued colors, and the use of so-called mixed technique. From that period are the so-called. erotic drawings, which testify to Motika's superior mastery of drawing conventions. He organized his first exhibitions in Zagreb (1933 and 1935), gaining attention and positive reactions, and the good propensity of art critics towards him. In 1940 he was transferred to Zagreb, where he worked at the School of Applied Arts until his retirement in 1961.

From the beginning of 1940, he systematically worked on studio research (so-called experiments: decalcomania, collages, photographs, chimneys, frothing, works on cellophane and glass, study of lumino-kinetic effects, application of organic materials). In the late 1940s, he again painted urban views ranging from almost monochrome works (Na Zrinjevcu zimi, 1940) to the dominance of greenery and accents of pure colors (Maksimir, around 1948). In 1952, he created a cycle of drawings in Zagreb called Archaic Surrealism (Arhajski nadrealizam). The exhibition thereof has become the main subject of theoretical and ideological discussion in Croatian fine arts criticism. Motika's so-called Archaic Surrealism symbolically speaks of the author's attitude towards contemporary art and social context; Motika opts for liberation from the dictates of ideological propaganda (that is of social realism), and for freedom of artistic expression. In the same year, he exhibited for the second time at the Venice Biennale.

In numerous sketches for ceramics and gouache collages, he shaped autonomous artistic practice, "creating the preconditions for a new form syntax, which in the 1950s and 1960s was equally expressed in his drawings, projects and experiments, paintings and sculptures." In the 1950s, he worked on illustrations for books. In doing this, he presented his own experience of music and realized his own version of visual poetry. In the second half of the 1950s, he introduced increasingly pronounced expressionist accents into easel painting. In the early 1960s, he worked on glass sculptures, combining the skill of volume modeling and the obsession with "pure" light, its refraction and lumino-kinetic effects with the application of a painting texture.

Since 1982, he became increasingly introverted. He painted less often, experimented more and more, drew sketches and made projects, and the number of his exhibitions drastically decreased. Among the many drawings of this latter period there are artistic works he made for advertising companies such as Pliva and other pharmaceutical companies. In the 1970s and 1980s, he worked on grotesque stylizations of drawings, which resulted in a series of bronze medals and plaques. His artistic expression is "marked by high modernism, poeticism, lyricism and an intimacy that rejects artistic purism."

Motika painted and exhibited with Pablo Picasso, who reportedly praised his work. Motika and Picasso met on two occasions, in Murano and Basel.

== Sources ==
- D. Schneider, Antun Motika 1927–1974, Zagreb 1974–75.
- R. Putar, Antun Motika u pisanoj riječi, Istra, 1984, 4–5.
- Ž. Koščević, Antun Motika – crteži, Zagreb 1985.
- G. Gamulin, Hrvatsko slikarstvo XX. stoljeća, Zagreb 1988.
- D. Schneider, Antun Motika, The Bird in the Log (selection of drawings 1930–1940, Zagreb 1989.
- Lj. Kolešnik, Hrvatska likovna kritika i zbivanja na hrvatskoj likovnoj sceni pedesetih (disertacija), Zagreb 1999.
- J. Denegri, Rasprava Grga Gamulin–Vjenceslav Richter o apstraktnoj umjetnosti, Novi Kamov, 2002, 1.
- D. Glavan, Antun Motika, Zagreb 2002.
