= Miroslav Kraljević =

Croatian artist (1885–1913)

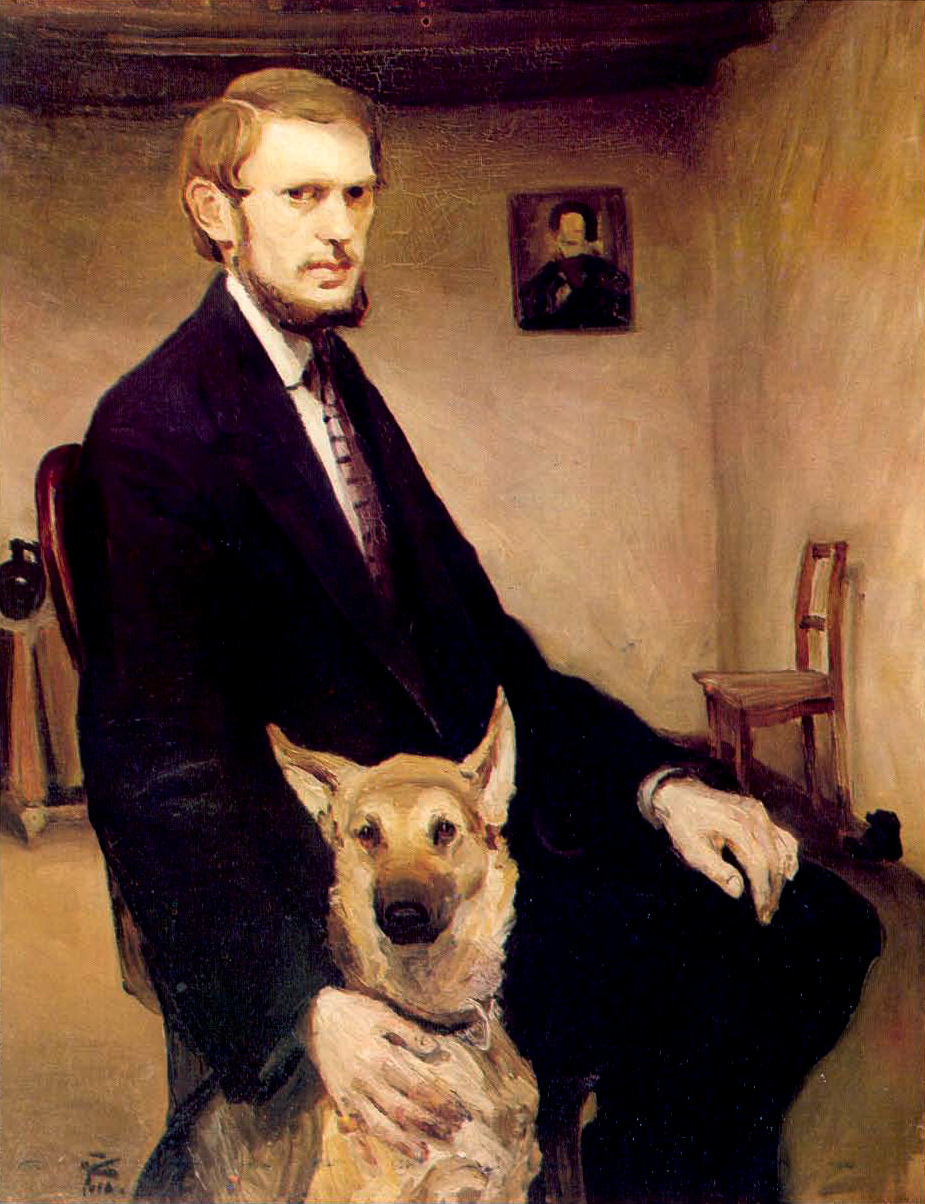
- Self-portrait with Dog by Miroslav Kraljević (1910), Oil on canvas. 110×85.5 cm, Modern Gallery, Zagreb
- Born: 14 December 1885; Gospić, Kingdom of Croatia-Slavonia, Austria-Hungary
- Died: 16 April 1913 (aged 27); Zagreb, Kingdom of Croatia-Slavonia, Austria-Hungary
- Education: Vienna, Munich, under Hugo von Habermann
- Known for: Painting, sculpture
- Notable work: Paintings (oils and watercolours), drawings, prints, sculpture
- Movement: Modern

Miroslav Kraljević (14 December 1885 – 16 April 1913) was a Croatian painter, printmaker and sculptor, active in the early part of the 20th century. He is one of the founders of modern art in Croatia.

Kraljević studied painting in Vienna and Munich at the prestigious Academy of Arts along with Oskar Herman, Vladimir Becić and Josip Račić. This group of Croatian artists were later called the Munich Circle, known for their influence on modern art in Croatia. After Munich, Kraljević spent time in the family home at Požega, and then in Paris where he produced his best work. He died in Zagreb in April 1913, aged 27, from tuberculosis.

Miroslav Kraljević painted in many different styles, including Impressionism, Pointillism and Expressionism. He also became known for his drawings of grotesque or erotic characters, in a similar way to Aubrey Beardsley, and for his sculptures. Working in a variety of media, he used almost every painting and drawing technique in his portraits, figures, still lifes, animals and landscapes. His graphics used etching and woodcut, and sculptures were created in clay, plaster and bronze.

== Biography ==
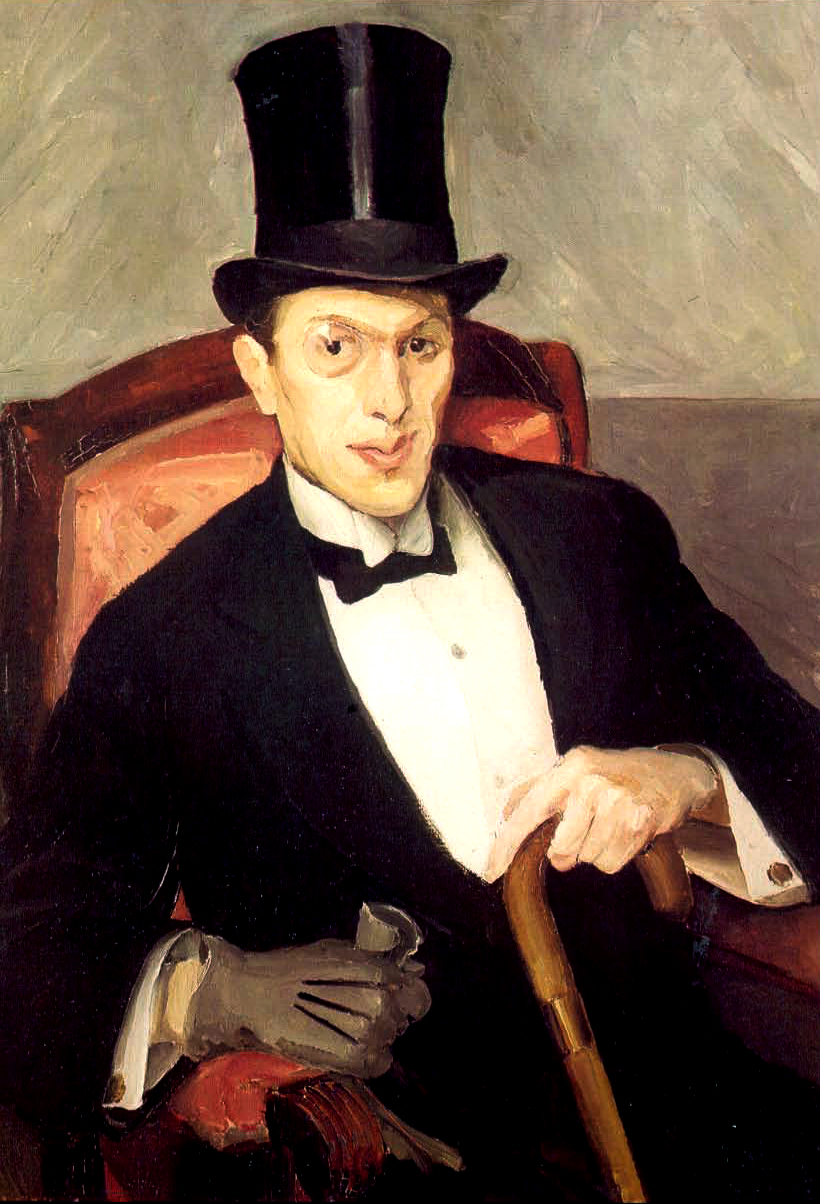
Bonvivant, 1912, oil on canvas, Modern Gallery in Zagreb.

Miroslav Kraljević was born on 14 December 1885 in Gospić, in the area of Lika. He belonged to Kraljevic aristocratic family that got its nobility in 1694 by Leopold I. His early childhood up to 7th grade high school (1888 to 1902) was spent in Zagreb, though he completed high school in Gospić (1902–1904). He loved poetry and music, and he was often seen drawing. In 1904, the young Kraljević left for Vienna. There, in addition to studying law, he took painting lessons privately with George Fischhof. After two years he gave up the study of law and devoted himself to painting.

In the autumn of 1906 Kraljević moved to Munich, where he spent two terms at the private school of Moritz Heymann, known for training excellent printermakers. After seven months in Munich, he enrolled in the prestigious Academy of Fine Arts and became a student of Hugo von Habermann. During his time there (1907–1910) he studied with fellow Croatian painters Josip Račić, Oskar Herman and Vladimir Becić. At that time Munich was an important center of the European art scene, particularly for Realism, Post-Impressionism, Symbolism and Jugendstil.

Upon completion of his studies in Munich, Kraljević returned to his family, who had by then moved to Požega, and where he spent 1910 and a good part of 1911. During this time, he painted Self-portrait with Dog (Croatian: Autoportret sa psom), and many of his other well-known portraits, landscapes and other works with rustic themes. He also returned to his interest in sculpture, producing works in clay, plaster and bronze.

In 1911, Kraljević received a state grant to study in Paris. He formally enrolled in the Academy La Grande Chaumiére, but instead began to paint intensively at the studios of friends. Here Kraljević's creative talent came to the fore, and despite the advancing effects of tuberculosis, he produced some of his best work, a range of motifs of Parisian life in drawings and oils. After a year, he left Paris and returned home to Požega.

In the autumn of 1912 Kraljević went to Zagreb, where he organized his first solo exhibition, which had a retrospective character. He rented a studio, where he continued to paint until December 1913. Then he went to a sanatorium in Berstovca for treatment. After two months, he left the hospital to return to Zagreb, where he died two days later on 16 April 1913 of tuberculosis. He was only 27 years old. He is buried in the family grave in Požega.

== Legacy ==
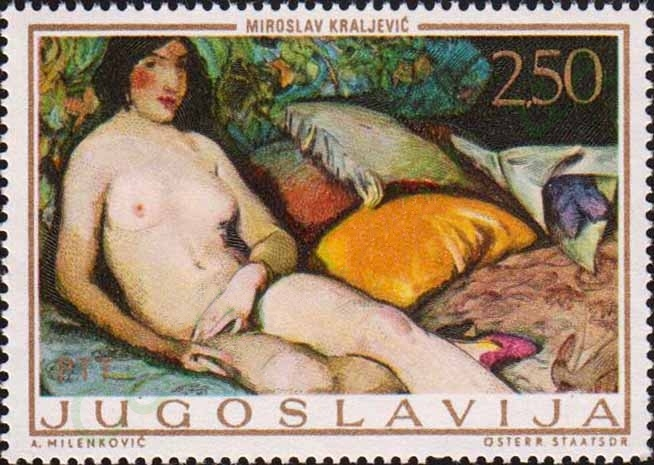
Stamp from Yugoslavia depicting Kraljević's Nude painting

The "Munich Circle" marks the beginning of Croatian Modernism. The term was coined in the 1950s, referring to the four artists who studied at the Munich Academy of Art in the early 1900s. Miroslav Kraljević, along with fellow Croatian artists Joseph Račić, Vladimir Becić and Oscar Herman established modern art in Croatia, setting a new direction from the previously dominant academic traditions. Their art was autonomous artistic expression, without literary, historical or moralistic framework, which puts them in direct contact with French impressionism, particularly with Manet and Cézanne as role models.

Kraljević is one of the founders of Croatian modern painting, and was known as a versatile artist. Difficult to categorize, his art explored many different styles and techniques. Kraljević's graphic work displays tonal qualities and a sense of light and dark relationships, suiting a sensitive temperament which could express extreme joy, but soon transform into deepest melancholy.

The most mature pictures of Kraljević's creative period were produced while he was in Požega: Krave na paši (Cows at Pasture), Bik (Bull), and U staji (In the Stables). Broad strokes and sharp contrasts of color show the artist in his natural element, the countryside, rather than the bourgeois parlor atmosphere. Also in Požega, he painted one of his best-known and finest self-portraits: Self-portrait with Dog. There he created and anthological works of Croatian art, such as Portret tete Luike (Portrait of Aunt Luike), Djevojčica s lutkom (Girl with Dolls) and portraits of his mother and father, and the poetic landscape painted with impressionistic atmosphere. His work contains elements of both Impressionism (for example in Park Luxembourg), and Expressionism (Women in the Park). His pipe pictures, also created in Paris, show methods similar to Cézanne.

The Gallery Miroslav Kraljević is an independent and non-profit contemporary art platform and gallery in Zagreb dedicated to promoting cutting-edge contemporary Croatian art and building links to the international art scene. It is named after Miroslav Kraljević "whose innovations exercised a decisive influence on Croatian visual art in the beginning of the 20th century".

== Works ==
- Autoportret sa psom (Self-portrait with Dog) 1910. oil on canvas
- Krave na paši (Cows at Pasture) 1910–11. oil on canvas
- Bik (Bull) 1910–11. oil on canvas
- U staji (In the Stables) 1910–11. oil on canvas
- Autoportret s lulom (Self-portrait with a pipe) 1911–12. oil on canvas
- Mali autoportret s paletom (Small self-portrait with a palette) 1911–12. oil on canvas
- Bonvivant 1912. oil on canvas
- Girl with a doll
- Park Luxembourg
- Women in the Park
- Great Park
- Female nude

== Exhibitions ==
=== Solo exhibits ===
- 1912 Gallery Ulrich, Zagreb - Miroslav Kraljević Solo Exhibit
- 1999 Gallery of Fine Arts, Osijek - Miroslav Kraljević Solo Show: prints and graphics from the Museum of Arts and Crafts, Zagreb
- 2004 Adris Gallery, Rovinj - Miroslav Kraljević Exhibit
- 2013–2014 Modern Gallery, Zagreb - largest retrospective exhibition of Kraljević's work to date, with nearly 200 works

=== Group exhibits ===
- 1914 International Printmaking Exhibition in Zagreb. An international print exhibition was held at which 160 artists took part, showing 870 works. Miroslav Kraljević was one of 14 Croatian artists exhibiting their work which included prints, drawings, pastels and watercolours.
- 1942 Venice Bienniale - Miroslav Kraljević was one of the Croatian artists' work on display in the Croatian exhibit that year.
- 1973 Art Pavilion Zagreb - Paintings of the Munich Circle
- 2007 Museum of Modern Art, Dubrovnik - From the Permanent Collection

=== Public collections ===
Public Collections in Croatia that hold works by Miroslav Kraljević

- Museum of Modern Art Dubrovnik, Dubrovnik
- MMSU - Museum of Modern and Contemporary Art Rijeka, Rijeka
- Galerija Umjetnina Split, Split
- MSU Muzej Suvremene Umjetnosti / Museum of Contemporary Art, Zagreb

Public Collection in Macedonia that holds work by Miroslav Kraljević

- Nacionalna Galerija - Chifte Amam - Skopje, Skopje

== Gallery ==
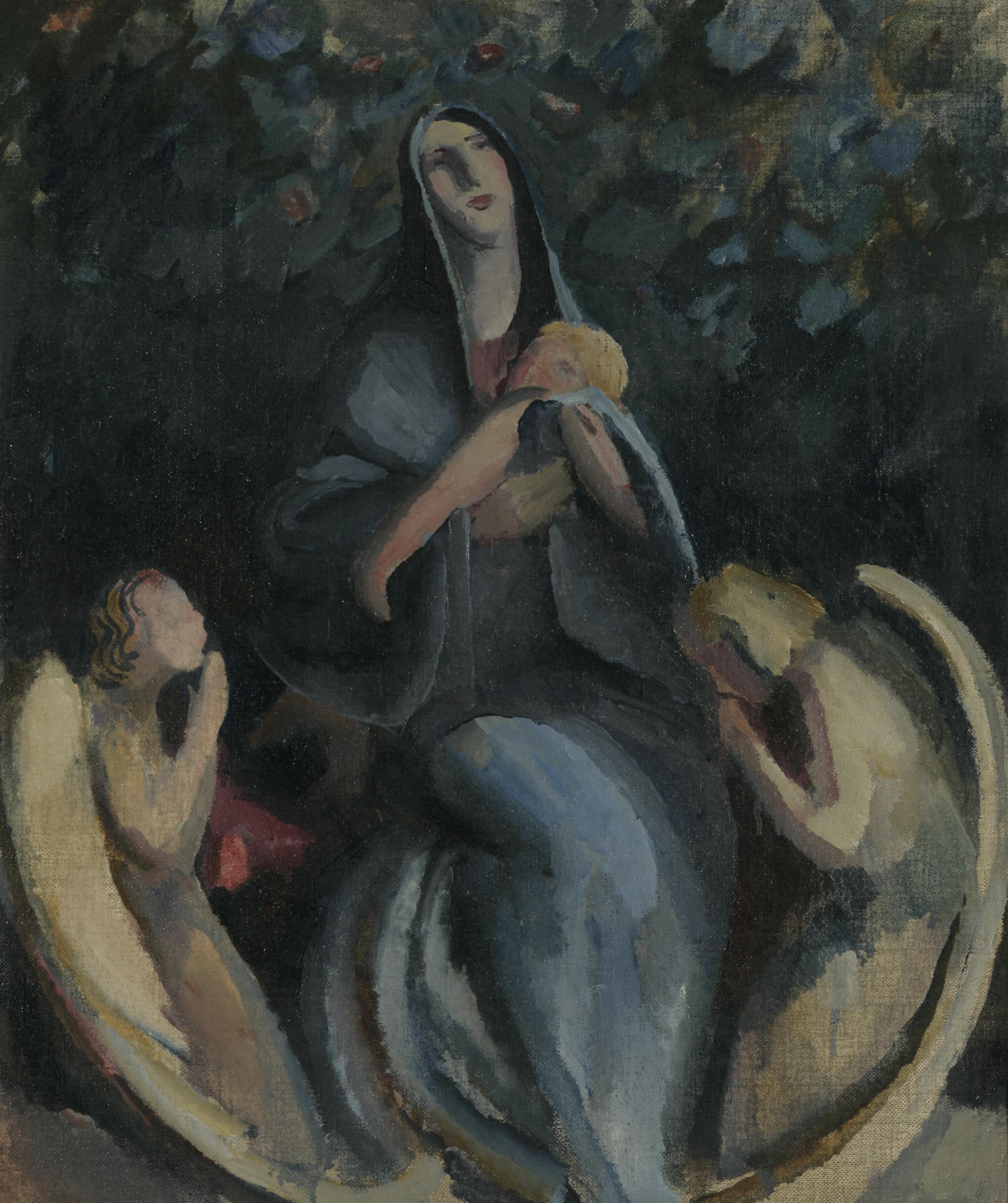
Madonna

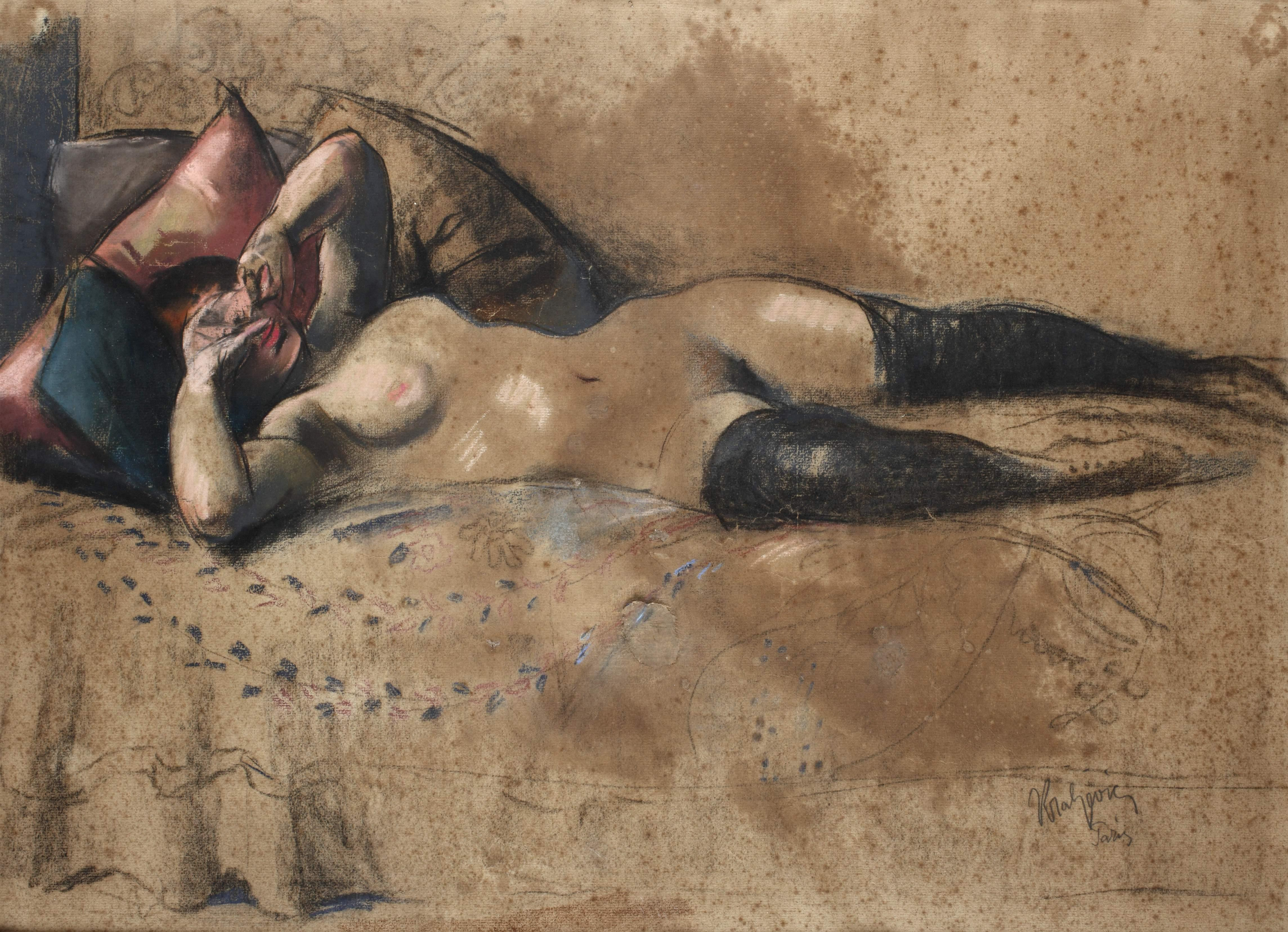
After

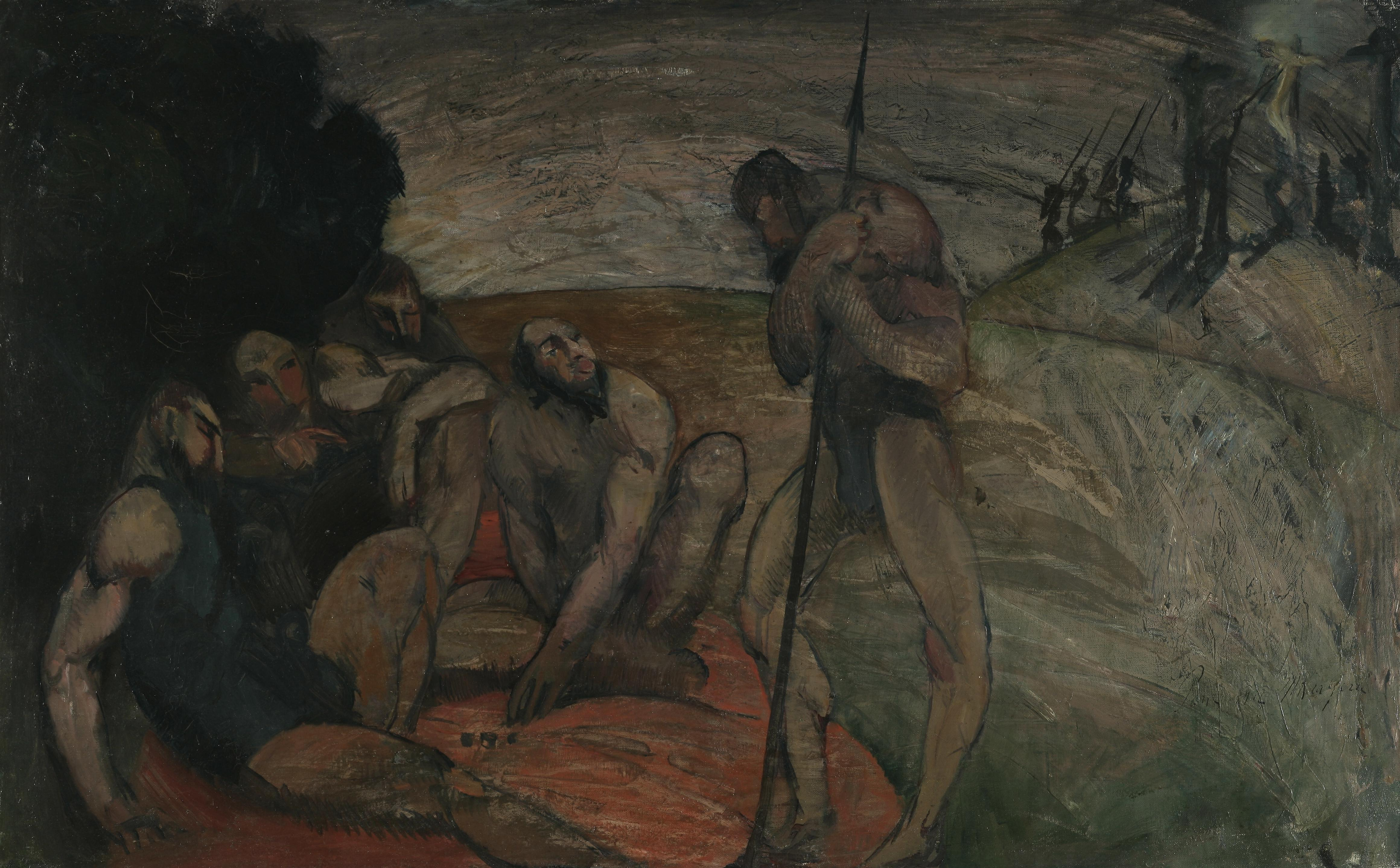
Golgotha

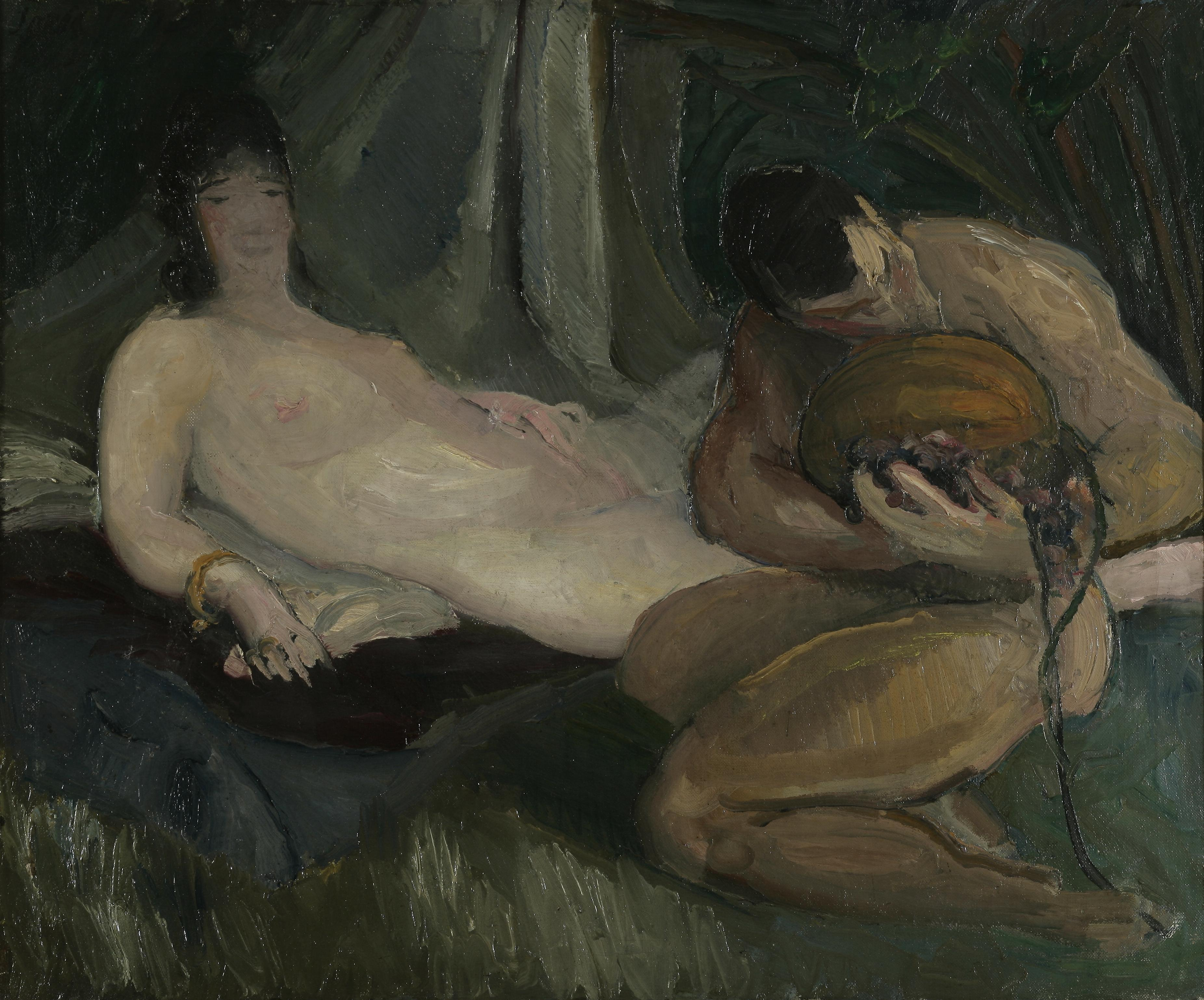
Ripe Fruit

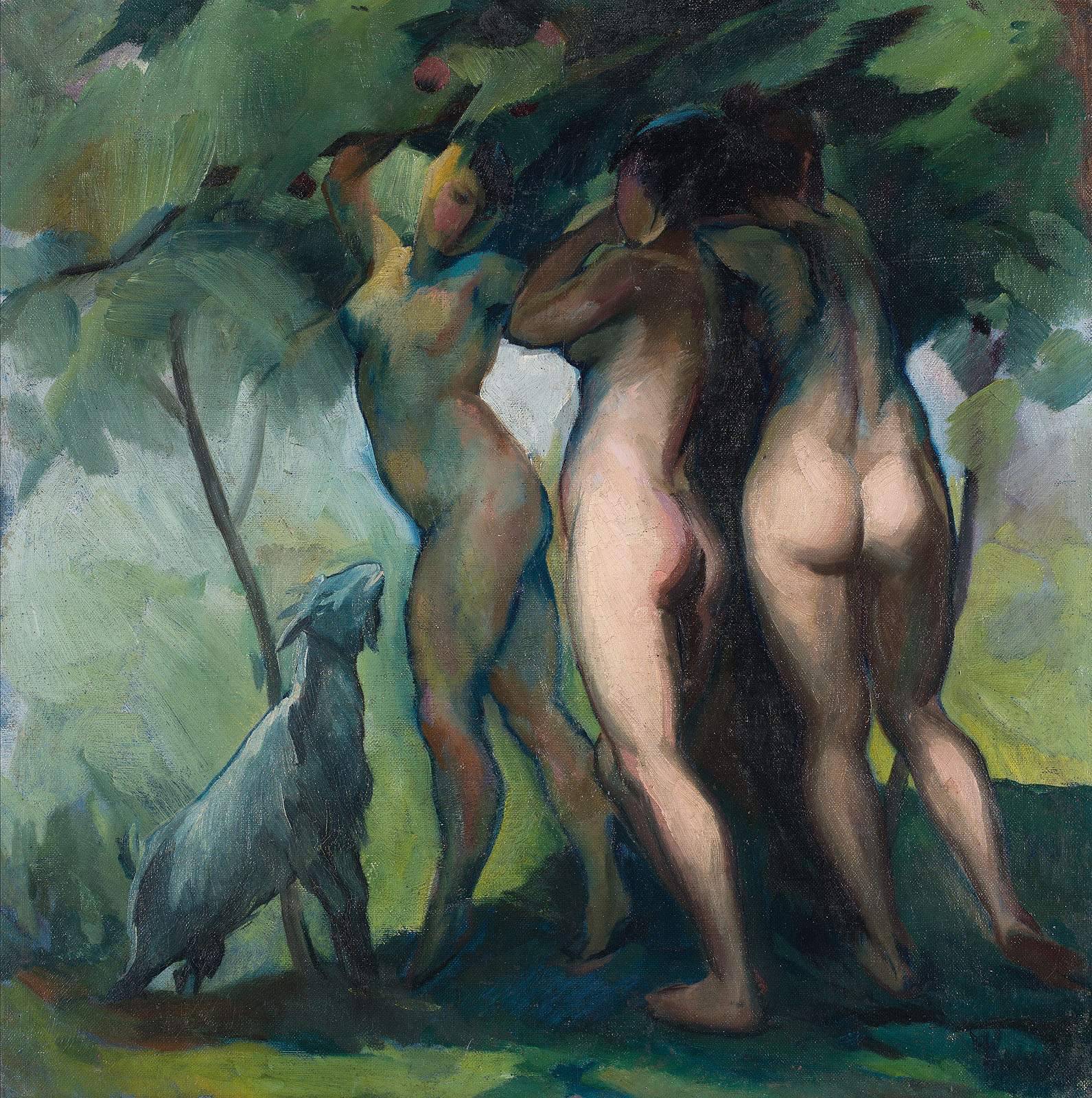
The Three Graces
