= Marin Studin =

Croatian sculptor

- Born: 1895; Kaštel Novi
- Died: 1960 (aged 64–65); Zagreb
- Education: Academy of Art, Zagreb
- Alma mater: Munich Academy
- Known for: Sculptor
- Movement: Resistance movement

Marin Studin (1895—1960) was a Croatian sculptor.

== Biography ==
Studin was born in 1895 in Kaštel Novi village in a family of farmers, not to far away from Split. He got his education in art at the Academy of Art, Zagreb and spent two years, from 1912 to 1914 in Munich Academy, Munich and later on moved to Vienna. He settled in Dalmatia where he made a lot of wooden sculptures for the churches of that area. By 1919 he had his first exhibition in Zagreb and later on continued studying sculpting in Paris. From 1921 to 1923 he traveled to Berlin, Prague, London and Rome where he worked on various monuments in a collaboration with Antoine Bourdelle. In 1929 he married Ivan Meštrović's sister and ten years later was appointed as a professor at the Academy of Art in Belgrade. When the war started he joined the resistance movement and after the war continued with the professor position till 1949. Later on, he held the same position at the Academy of Art in Zagreb and then died in Split in 1960.
