= Frano Kršinić =

Croatian sculptor

- Born: 24 July 1897; Lumbarda, Kingdom of Dalmatia, Austria-Hungary
- Died: 1 January 1982 (aged 84); Zagreb, SR Croatia, SFR Yugoslavia
- Education: Hořice stonemasonry school Prague Art Academy
- Known for: Sculpture

Frano Kršinić (24 July 1897 – 1 January 1982) was a Croatian sculptor active in former Yugoslavia. Along with Ivan Meštrović and Antun Augustinčić, he is considered one of the three most important Croatian sculptors of the 20th century. His most widely known work is the statue of Nikola Tesla installed at the Niagara Falls State Park, United States, an identical copy of the monument residing in front of the building of the School of Electrical Engineering, University of Belgrade (Serbia).

== Biography ==
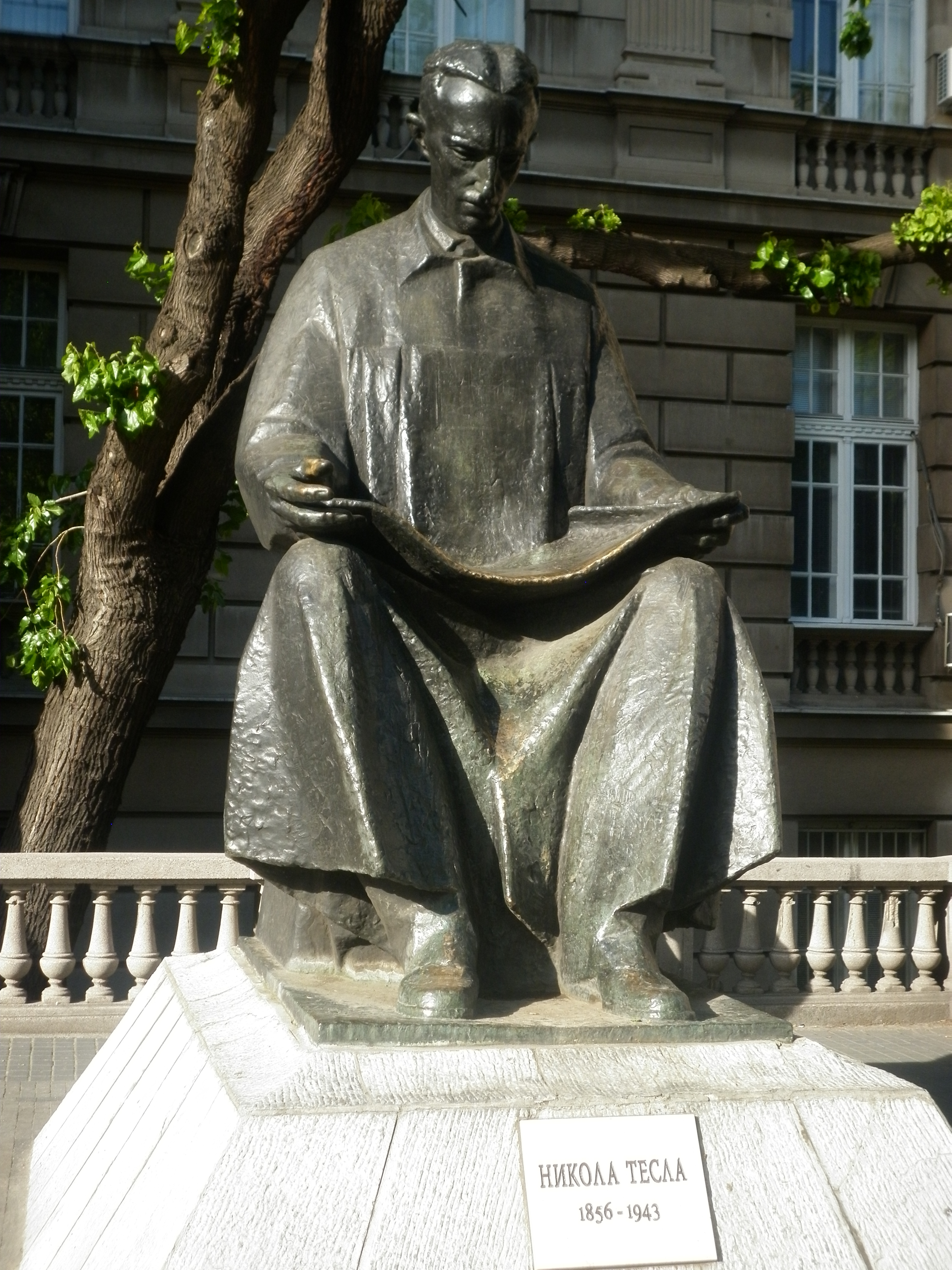
A Tesla monument erected in 1963 in front of the building of University of Belgrade School of Electrical Engineering

Kršinić was born in 1897 in the village of Lumbarda on the Adriatic island of Korčula in south Croatia, which was at the time part of the Austro-Hungarian Empire. He was born into a family with a long tradition of stonemasonry, and he was also trained at the local stonemasonry school before going on to attend the stone-working and masonry school in Hořice (in present-day Czech Republic) in 1912. Upon graduation in 1916 he enrolled at the Academy of Fine Arts in Prague, where he studied in the classes of renowned Czech sculptors Josef Václav Myslbek and Jan Štursa and graduated in 1920. He then returned to Croatia and settled in Zagreb, where he worked as a freelance sculptor before becoming a teacher of sculpting at the Academy of Fine Arts Zagreb in 1924.

By the late 1920s his individual expression was formed, away from the mainstream of Art Deco and the overwhelming influence of Ivan Meštrović. In this period his style and sculptural elegance took shape through a number of works defined by soft lines in closed forms such as Awakening, Diana, Young Woman Tending a Rose, Reading, After the Bath and others.

In the following decades Kršinić devoted himself to works marked by finer chiseling in marble, mostly of female art nudes and motherly motifs, such as sculptures titled Meditation, Mother Feeding a Child, etc. In 1947 he was made master sculptor and head of the sculpting workshop at the Zagreb Academy of Fine Arts, and in 1948 he became a member of the Croatian Academy of Sciences and Arts. In his last decades Krsinic created numerous small format sculptures which varied the theme of the young girl, as well as art nudes. Works such as Worry, Sunbathing and Resting are said to represent perfection in the softness of sculpting in marble. He retired from teaching in 1967 and in 1975 he stopped sculpting.
