= Ljubo Babić =

Croatian artist, museum curator and literary critic

- Born: 14 June 1890; Jastrebarsko, Croatia-Slavonia, Austria-Hungary
- Died: 14 May 1974 (aged 83); Zagreb, SR Croatia, Yugoslavia
- Education: Academy of Fine Arts, Munich
- Known for: oil painting, watercolour, graphic arts, theatrical set design, art history, author, curator
- Movement: Modern Art

Ljubomir Tito Stjepan Babić (14 June 1890 – 14 May 1974) was a Croatian artist, museum curator and literary critic. As an artist, he worked in a variety of media including oils, tempera, watercolour, drawing, etching, and lithography. He was one of the most influential figures in the Zagreb art scene between the two world wars.

He collaborated with director Branko Gavella in creating a series of set designs for the Croatian National Theatre in Zagreb. In 1940 he became a full professor at the Academy of Fine Arts Zagreb. He held exhibitions at home and abroad and published many articles on art history and critiques of contemporary art events. He wrote and illustrated many books, worked on designs for posters, interiors and decorative arts objects.

== Biography ==
Ljubomir Tito Stjepan Babić was born in Jastrebarsko on 14 June 1890, the son of Judge Antun Babić and Milka (née Kovačić), and nephew of the author Ljubo Babić (better known as Ksaver Šandor Gjalski). The Babić family had been raised to the nobility in 1716 by Charles VI Habsburg. The Babić family seat was Gredice near Zabok, which had been purchased by Babić's grandfather.

Following his father's work transfers, young Ljubo attended elementary school in Slatina, Glina and Jastrebarsko. He attended high school in Bjelovar, with the final two years in the Donji Grad gymnasium in Zagreb. During that time, he attended private art school with Menci Clement Crnčić and Bela Čikoš Sesija, and took classes at the School of Arts and Crafts. After completing high school in 1908, at his father's encouragement he enrolled in the Faculty of Law at Zagreb University, but soon abandoned his studies for painting.

Thanks to a scholarship from Count Teodor Pejačević Babić was able to attend the Academy of Fine Arts, Munich where he studied painting with Angelo Jank (1910–11), and Franz von Stuck (1911–13). In Munich, he completed a course of artistic anatomy at the Medical School while also studying set design at the Künstlertheater. In 1913-14 he went on to complete his art studies in Paris, returning to his homeland at the beginning of the First World War.

He exhibited his artworks as a part of Kingdom of Serbia's pavilion at International Exhibition of Art of 1911.

There he opened a "modern painting school" in his studio, but soon afterwards accepted a teaching position at the School of Arts, (now the Academy of Fine Arts) where he became a full professor in 1940, working there for 45 years until he retired in 1961. During the 1930s, he visited other schools and institutes around Europe in order to learn from their experience and improve teaching at the Zagreb academy. In 1932, he graduated in art history from the Faculty of Philosophy, Zagreb University.

In addition to his painting and teaching careers, Ljubo Babić was the first curator of the Modern Gallery in Zagreb (1919) whose inaugural exhibition featured the previously unknown works of Josip Račić. He organized exhibitions of modern French and German Art in Zagreb, and an exhibition of medieval art from Yugoslavia in Paris in 1950. For many years he was the director of The Strossmayer Gallery of Old Masters (from 1947) responsible for organizing many important exhibitions.

Babić was one of the organizers of the Croatian Spring Salon (1916), the Independent group of Croatian artists (1923), the Group of Three (1929), Group of Four (1928), the group of Croatian artists (1936) and Croatian artists (1939).

Ljubo Babić was elected as a Member of Croatian Academy of Sciences and Arts in 1928, becoming a full member in 1950. He died in Zagreb on 14 May 1974.

== Legacy ==
Ljubo Babić was a central figure in the Croatian art scene in the period between the two world wars. His views provided a strong influence over the art of the time. His early work from Munich shows some poetic symbolism and aspects of art nouveau. In portraits, he soon began to depict the more psychological characteristics of his subject. From 1916, expressionistic ideas and themes appeared, and a move towards abstraction, resulting in some of his finest works. In November 1916, on the death of Emperor Francis Joseph, all the streets of Zagreb were dressed in black flags. Inspired by this image, Babić, then aged 26, painted the scene from the second floor window of his studio on Ilica Street. In the foreground is a long, torn black flag and behind it are ominous clouds, and below the people passing. Black Flag (Crna zastava) stands as one of his most memorable images.

Writer Miroslav Krleža said of Babić - in the years between 1916 and 1922 - that he was strongly influenced by the time and by his own ideas. A strong influence on both was the poet Silvije Strahimir Kranjčević. Babić illustrated Kranjčević's "Poems" (Pjesme, 1908) and many of the poet's themes entered Babić's own work. From the inspiration of the mountain Velebit as seen from Crnčić, Babić created one of his most successful series: "View from the Sky" (Pogled s neba), "Aerial view" (Arielov pogled). He would later be known as the father of modern landscape painting in Croatia.

A journey to Spain in 1920 resulted in an expressive series of paintings, including the powerful black "Fishermen" (Ribari). This cycle of Spanish street scenes was well received and stands as a high point of Babić's own art and Croatian painting in general.

Around 1930, Babić started a series of landscapes and portraits of people from around Croatia. He would travel south in the summer months, sketching scenes from Koločep and Pelješac, to Čiovo and Trogir (1930–1936). He was working on what he called "native expression", believing that the landscape, historical experience and folk art could reveal the characteristics of the people. Back in his studio, he created an impressive cycle of landscapes (the series Homeland, Rodni kraj 1933-1939). This series brings his art close to documentary work and Babić worked closely with Matica hrvatska on aspects of folk heritage and modern cultural and artistic issues.

Babić was one of the creators of the golden years of Zagreb theatre life in the 1920s/30s. He made his debut as set designer in 1918, altogether creating about 180 designs (often also sketches for the costumes) for drama, comedy and operatic performances. His designs were always based on the logic of the stage events, and contributed greatly to the development of dramatic action. He was also the founder of the first artistic Puppet Theatre in Zagreb (1920), and his set designs for the Paris Expo in 1925, earned him the Grand Prix.

In addition to being a creative artist and designer, Babić was also an interpreter and popularizer of art: as an art writer and critic, as a lecturer, and as a museum curator. He was regarded as a reliable interpreter of Croatian heritage in art museums and exhibitions between 1919 and 1948. He also created posters and some successful books on art (1908–1960).

Babić's literary output includes 20 books, brochures and special editions, around 400 articles in periodicals, many encyclopedia articles and several educational programs. In addition to educational and critic works, he left a number of travel and autobiographical texts. Babić's travelogue text New York "skyline" was included in the anthology America Spectrum from one hundred forty-one works of European writers and works (Spektrum America aus Werken hunderteinundvierzig europäischer Dichter und Werken), Wien-München-Manutius Press, 1964. He was a member of several editorial boards of literary magazines, and editor of the Academy bulletin 1957.

== Works ==
=== Paintings ===
- From Munich Studio (Iz münchenskog atelijera), 1911
- Self-portrait (Autoportret), 1912
- Portrait of A.G. Matoš (Portret A. G. Matoša), 1913
- Black flag (Crna zastava), 1916
- Portrait of Miroslav Krleža (Portret M. Krleže), 1918
- Christ (Krist), around 1918
- Landscape ("Krajolik"), 1918
- Red Flags (Crveni stjegovi) I. i II., 1919
- View from Brestovac (Pogled s Brestovca), 1919
- Crucifixion (Golgota), 1919
- Building ("Izgradnja"), 1919
- Crucifixion ("Raspeće"), 1920
- Spanish cycle (watercolours) (ciklus akvarela S puta po Španjolskoj), 1920
- Funeral ("Pogreb"), 1926
- Croatian peasant (Hrvatski seljak), 1926
- Figs (Smokve), 1928
- Spring flowers (Proljetno cvijeće), 1930
- Smokvice near Viganj (Smokvice kod Vignja), 1930
- Landscape (Pejzaž), 1931
- A road on Koločep (Put na Koločepu), 1932
- Nevenka, 1932
- From Mrežnica ("S Mrežnice), 1932
- My Studio (Moj atelijer), 1933
- Portrait of my wife (Portret supruge), 1934
- Spring Landscape (Proljetni pejzaž), 1936
- Autumn on Čiovo (Jesen na Čiovu), 1936
- Self-portrait (Autoportret), 1937
- Zagorje Landscape (Zagorski pejzaž), 1937
- Homeland (Rodni kraj) (Pred večernjicu), 1938
- Janica, 1938
- Dried Flowers (Suho cvijeće), 1942
- Spring, house and I (Proljeće, kuća i ja), 1953
- From my Garden (Iz mog vrta), 1956
- Orebić, 1964

=== Theatrical Set Designs ===
- Verdi: Othelo, 1918
- Goethe: Faust, 1921
- Krleža: Golgota, 1922
- Širola-Babić: Sjene, 1923
- Debussy: Peleas i Melisanda, 1923
- Shakespeare: King Richard III, 1923
- Krleža: Vučjak, 1923
- Shakespeare: Na tri kralja…, 1924
- Wedekind: Proljeće se budi, 1924
- Shakespeare: Hamlet, 1929
- Beethoven: Fidelio, 1930
- Büchner: Dantonova smrt, 1937
- Cesarec: Sin domovine, 1940
- Pirandello: Večeras improviziramo, 1941
- Shakespeare: Hamlet (nova verzija, neostvareno), 1941

=== Book Illustrations ===
- Kumičić: Začuđeni svatovi, 1910
- Kučera-Plivelić-Božičević: Novovjeki izumi, 1910
- Nazor: Hrvatski kraljevi, 1912
- Dante: Čistilište, 1912
- Bazala: Povijest filozofije, 1912
- Vidrić: Pjesme, 1914
- Donadini: Lude priče, 1915
- Schneider: Oprema opere, 1916
- Nehajev: Studija o Hamletu, 1917
- Krleža: Pjesme I, Pjesme II, 1918
- Vijavica (časopis), 1919
- Juriš (časopis), 1919
- Plamen (časopis), 1919
- Begović: Dunja u kovčegu, 1921
- Cesarec: Careva kraljevina, 1925
- Shakespeare: Sabrana djela (nedovršeno), 1947–1960
- Ljetopis popa Dukljanina, 1950
- Ariosto: Bijesni Orlando, 1953
- A.G. Matoš: Sabrana djela (nedovršeno), 1953–1955
- Goethe: Faust, 1955

=== Books and publications ===
- Maestral, 1931
- Croatian Art in the 19th Century (Umjetnost kod Hrvata u XIX. stoljeću), Zagreb 1934
- Under Italian Skies (Pod italskim nebom), Zagreb 1937
- Croatian Art (Umjetnost kod Hrvata) (SD, I), Zagreb 1943
- Masters of the Renaissance (Majstori preporoda) (SD, II), Zagreb 1943
- Colour and Harmony (Boja i sklad), Zagreb 1943
- Art Forms (Oblici umieća), I. knj. (SD, III), Zagreb 1944
- The Golden Age of Spanish Painting (Zlatni viek španjolskog slikarstva) (SD, IV), Zagreb 1944
- Honoré Daumier, Zagreb 1951
- French Painting of the 19th Century (Francusko slikarstvo XIX. stoljeća), Zagreb 1953
- Between Two Worlds (Između dva svijeta), Zagreb 1955
- Izabrana djela (s C. Fiskovićem), Zagreb 1985

== Exhibitions ==
Babić exhibited from 1910 until his death in 1974 in solo, group and collective shows around the world, including the "Medulić" Munich annual exhibition with other artists of the Vienna (Austria) Secession, the Croatian Spring Salon, Lade exhibitions, Independent Artists, Group of Three, Croatian artists, the XXI Venice Biennale, and in a number of other exhibitions of Croatian and Yugoslav artists. At the Exposition internationale in Paris 1925 and in New York in 1926, he worked in the International Theatre Exhibition.

=== Solo shows ===
- 2010/11 Ljubo Babić – Antologija (Anthology) Modern gallery, Zagreb.
- 1975/6 Ljubo Babić Retrospektiva, Modern Gallery, Zagreb

=== Group shows ===
Recent exhibitions of Babić's work include:

- 2008 From the holdings of the museum - Museum of Modern Art Dubrovnik, Dubrovnik
- 2006 Croatian Collection - Museum of Contemporary Art Skopje, Skopje

=== Public collections ===
Babić's work can be found in the following public collections

Croatia

- Modern Gallery, Zagreb
- Museum of Contemporary Art, Zagreb
- Museum of Modern Art, Dubrovnik
- Gallery of Fine Arts, Split
- Art Museum, Osijek
- Fine Art Gallery, Rijeka

Macedonia (F.Y.R.M.)

- Museum of Contemporary Art Skopje
