= Waldinger =

Waldinger is a surname. Notable people with the surname include:

- Adolf Waldinger (1843–1904), Croatian painter
- Richard Waldinger, American computer scientist
- Robert J. Waldinger (born 1951), American psychiatrist and professor

== See also ==
- Gallery Waldinger, art museum in Croatia
