= Oskar Herman =

Croatian-Jewish painter (1886–1974)

- Born: 17 March 1886; Zagreb, Kingdom of Croatia-Slavonia, Austria-Hungary
- Died: 22 January 1974 (aged 87); Zagreb, SR Croatia, SFR Yugoslavia
- Education: Zagreb, Munich
- Known for: painting
- Notable work: paintings in oils and watercolour, drawings
- Movement: colourist expressionism, modern

Oskar Herman (1886–1974) was a Croatian-Jewish painter. He was one of the group of Croatian artists known as the Munich Circle, who had a strong influence on modern art in Croatia.

== Biography ==
Herman was born on 17 March 1886 in Zagreb to Croatian-Jewish family of Danijel and Jozefina Herman. His father died when he was 4 years old. He initially attended business school in Zagreb, although his interest was in drawing and painting. He studied art at the painting school of K. Filip in Zagreb. Then he moved to Munich where in 1904, like his compatriot Josip Račić, he attended the school of the Slovene painter and teacher Anton Ažbe. In 1905 he enrolled in the Academy of Fine Arts in Munich, where he studied until 1910 under teachers such as Hugo von Habermann. At that time Munich was a center of European art scene for Realism, Post-Impressionism, Symbolism and Jugendstil.

In 1914, after the start of World War I, Herman returned to Zagreb. Being partially unfit for military service, he served the army in Zagreb, from 1915 to 1918. He then went to Munich again, where he continued to live until 1933, with short stays in Zagreb, Berlin and Paris. At that point, due to the escalation of Nazism, he returned to Zagreb. During his stay in Munich he regularly displayed his work, with some success, at solo shows as well as participating in exhibitions of Munich Secession Art.

In the war years, Herman joined Partisan forces and was captured and confined in the Internment camp (1942–44) of Ferramonti di Tarsia, in Calabria, southern Italy. After his release he joined the artists colony of Cozzano.

In 1944, Herman returned to Croatia and rejoined the Partisans. In 1945 he started work as a curator at the Modern Gallery in Zagreb, a position he held until his retirement in 1954. That year he prepared a retrospective exhibition at the Museum of Arts and Crafts, and in 1971 a major retrospective at the Art Pavilion. Herman was a reclusive artist, so his work was late in being accepted and understood.

Herman died on 22 January 1974 in Zagreb and was buried at the Mirogoj Cemetery.

== Legacy ==
Nagovaranje (Persuasion, 1921)

As a member of the famous Munich Circle, Herman's early work had a strong influence on Croatian contemporary art from the first half of the twentieth century. As the longest lived member of the group, Oskar Herman had the most time to develop as an artist, yet he remains the least well-known and accepted within Croatia. Recent acclaimed retrospective exhibitions have shown previously unknown Herman drawings, most of them from the Munich period (1906–1933) and have led to a better appreciation of his work. While in Munich, Herman encountered the ideas of prominent art historian Julius Meier-Graefe and his aesthetics of "pure visibility". He found inspiration in the work of such artists as Giorgione, Tintoretto, Palma Vecchio, and Hans von Marées.

Herman was a solitary artist who pursued his own vision, largely unaffected by contemporary trends in modern art. By the 1920s he was known for being somewhat of a recluse. His use of symbolism developed before the expressionism movement became widespread. His paintings show ever stronger expressiveness, with his main motive to depict man and his inner world. Herman's early watercolours show strong, brilliant colours out of which his own particular expressionist colourism developed. From 1925, his work also reflected an increasing vision of future persecution and terror.

Herman's 1973 painting Dva stabla pod brijegom (Two Trees at the Foot of a Hill) was featured on a stamp in the series Croatian Modern Paintings issued 2008.

== Works ==
- Dva stabla pod brijegom (Two Trees at the Foot of a Hill) 1973

== Exhibitions ==
=== Solo shows ===
- 1963 Oskar Herman – Galerija Umjetnina Split, Split
- 1994 Oskar Herman – Gallery of Fine Arts / Galerija likovnih umjetnosti, Osijek, Osijek
- 2006 Oskar Herman – Paintings and drawings 1906–1974 – Museum of Modern Art Dubrovnik, Dubrovnik
- 2007 Oskar Herman: Drawings – Glyptotheque – Sculpture Museum, Zagreb
- 2010 Exhibition of Oskar Herman paintings opens in Zagreb 23 June – 3 Dec Exhibition includes 340 pieces from his earliest work made in Munich to his last painting in 1974.

=== Group shows ===
- 1973 Paintings of the Munich Circle – Umjetnicki paviljon / Art Pavilion Zagreb, Zagreb
- 2006 Croatian Collection – Museum of Contemporary Art Skopje, Skopje
- 2007 Iz fundusa galerije – Museum of Modern Art Dubrovnik, Dubrovnik
- 2008 From the holdings of the museum – Museum of Modern Art Dubrovnik, Dubrovnik
- 2009–10 Zagreb – Munich: Croatian painters and the Academy of Art in Munich – Art Pavilion in Zagreb

=== Public collections ===
- Museum of Modern Art, Dubrovnik, Croatia
- Museum of Modern and Contemporary Art, Rijeka, Croatia
- Rovinj Heritage Museum, Rovinj, Croatia
- Art Gallery, Split, Croatia
- Museum of Contemporary Art, Zagreb, Croatia
- Museum of Contemporary Art Skopje, Skopje, Macedonia (F.Y.R.M.)

== Bibliography ==
- Bavoljak, Jasmina (2013). "Oskar Herman, slikar praznine i melankolije" [Oskar Herman, a painter of emptiness and melancholy] (PDF) (in Croatian). Osijek: Gallery Waldinger.
- Knežević, Snješka; Laslo, Aleksander (2011). Židovski Zagreb. Zagreb: AGM, Židovska općina Zagreb. ISBN 978-953-174-393-8.
- Zidić, Igor (2012). "O Hermanu, opet (novi ogled i davni razgovor)" [On Herman, Again (a new review and a long-ago dialogue)] (PDF) (in Croatian, Italian, and English). Adris Grupa. Archived from the original (PDF) on 24 February 2014.
