= Slavka Atanasijević =

Serbian pianist and composer

Slavka (Alojzija) Atanasijević (November 2, 1850 – December 1897) was a Serbian pianist and composer.

== Biography ==
The Atanasijević family was of Tzintzar origins and in kinship with the Karamata family from Zemun. Slavka was born in Osijek, Croatia, a daughter of the Osijek physician and cultural activist Vasilije Atanasijević (Bešenovo, Srem, 1795 – Osijek, 1877), a collaborator and friend of Vuk Karadžić. Her mother, Persida von Duka, was from Arad (Romania). Slavka's sister, Marija (Osijek, 1842 – Sombor, 1891), married Veselinović, was a painter. Slavka and Marija had five more siblings, three brothers and two sisters, all of whom were educated.

Since her childhood, Atanasijević received general and music education from her father. She studied mainly privately with respected Osijek pedagogues: sciences with Dr. Živko Vukasović (1829–1874), zoologist and entomologist, a member of the Yugoslav Academy of Sciences and Arts in Zagreb, and drawing with the painter Hugo Conrad von Hoetzendorf (1807–1869). Beside her native language, she was fluent in German, French, and Hungarian languages.

Slavka Atanasijević studied music privately in Osijek: voice with Ivan Nepomuk Hummel (1820–1896), violin with director of the Croatian Vocal Society "Linden" ("Lipa") Theodor Machulka (1848–1920), and piano with Đuro Trischler. She specialized in piano performing on her own and during her studies in Vienna. Effectively self-taught, Atanasijević acquired composition skills through the renowned textbook by Adolf Bernhard Marx (1795–1866) Theory and Practice of Musical Composition (Die Lehre von der musikalischen Komposition praktisch-theoretisch, I–IV, 1837–1847).

She began her concert career in 1874 at social and charity events where she performed popular pieces by other composers as well as her own. Atanasijević gave concerts in Sombor, Osijek (with the „Linden” Vocal Society), Novi Sad, Subotica, Zagreb, Pest, Graz, and Vienna. She also performed at various spas in Austria (e.g., Bad Aussee, Gleichenberg, Karlsbad, Marienbad, and Bad Ischl). Following her unfortunate marriage to the Polish painter Andrzej Eugeniusz Kwiatkowski, who was on duty as a land surveyor in cadastre registry in Bosnia, she withdrew from the public spotlight in 1882, and died in Vienna, aged 47.

As a composer and pianist, Slavka Atanasijević received recognition from pedagogues, artists, and critics of her time (e.g., Franjo Kuhač and Antun Schwartz). While she started composing in her early childhood, only three of her compositions, piano variations and fantasies on folk and town melodies, survived. Influences of virtuoso, salon-style of Alexander Dreyschock and Franz Liszt in Atanasijević's works were noted in articles by music critics and historiographers.

The partially preserved musical legacy of Slavka Atanasijević is kept in the archives of the Croatian Vocal Society "Linden" in Osijek. The biographical materials about Atanasijević, collected by Franjo Kuhač for his unpublished Biographical and musicological dictionary (Biografski i muzikografski slovnik) are located at the Archive of the Croatian Academy of Sciences and Arts in Zagreb.

== Works ==
=== For piano ===
- Na te mislim (You are on my mind). Fantasie de Concert, pour Piano-Forte, op. 1. Lith. Anst. V. Engelmann & Mühlberg, Leipzig s. a., pp. 3–15, 4°; 2nd edition: Naklada Kralj. Sveuč. Knjižare Fr. Župana (St. Kugli), knjižare L. Hartmana, Zagreb s. a.
- Ustaj, ustaj, mili rode, i duboki san svoj stresi (Rise, Dear Folk, and Awake from a Deep Sleep). Chansonette Slave. Variée pour le piano, op. 2. Lith. de Engelmann et Mühlberg, Leipzig s. a., pp. 3–13, 4°.
- Reflets du printemps. Polka Caprice pour Piano, op. 6. Lith. de Engelmann & Mühlberg, Leipzig s. a., pp. 2–9, 4°.

=== Sheet music ===
- "Odsjaji proleća" / "Reflets du printemps" (Polka caprice), op. 6. In From the Novi Sad Salons: Album of Salon Dances for Piano, pp. 34–42. Ed. Marijana Kokanović. Editor's comments in Serbian and English, pp. 7, 10–11, 13–14, 17–18, 20, 33. Novi Sad: Matica srpska, 2010.

=== Recording ===
- Reflets du printemps (Odblesci proleća), Polka caprice, op. 6; and You are on my mind (Na te mislim), concert fantasy upon a Serbian popular song theme, op. 1. On CD: Serbian Piano Music. In Honor of the Ladies of the Romantic Epoch (Srpska klavirska muzika: U čast dama romantične epohe). Jasmina Janković, piano. Beograd: Kolo srpskih sestara, 2008; 2nd edition: 2011.

== Literature ==
- Ma. St. [Marijanović, Stanislav]. 1983. "Atanasijević, Slavka (Aloysia)". In Croatian biographical lexicon (Hrvatski biografski leksikon), Vol. 1, ed. Nikica Kolumbić. Zagreb: Jugoslavenski leksikografski zavod, p. 261.
- "Atanasijević, Slavka (Aloysia)". 1984. In the Lexicon of Yugoslav Music (Leksikon jugoslavenske muzike), Vol. 1, ed. Krešimir Kovačević. Zagreb: Jugoslavenski leksikografski zavod „Miroslav Krleža”, p. 23.
- Hadžihusejnović-Valašek, Miroslava. 1985. "Serbian musicians in Kuhač’s Biographical dictionary" ("Srpski muzičari u Kuhačevom Biografskom slovniku"). In Kornelije Stanković and his time (Kornelije Stanković i njegovo doba), ed. Dimitrije Stefanović. Beograd: Srpska akademija nauka i umetnosti & Muzikološki institut SANU, pp. 259–86.
- Perić, Đorđe. 1994. "Women composers in Serbian music bibliography" ("Žene kompozitori u srpskoj muzičkoj bibliografiji"). In Zbornik Matice srpske za scenske umetnosti i muziku, Novi Sad, no. 14, pp. 183–88.
- Vasić, Aleksandar. 2004. "Atanasijević, Slavka Alojzija". In Serbian biographical dictionary (Srpski biografski rečnik), Vol. I, eds. Mladen Leskovac, Aleksandar Forišković, and Čedomir Popov. Novi Sad: Matica srpska, pp. 298–99.
- Jeremić-Molnar, Dragana. 2006. Serbian piano music in the Romantic era: 1841–1914 (Srpska klavirska muzika u doba romantizma: 1841–1914). Novi Sad: Matica srpska.
- Kokanović, Marijana. 2008. Dances and marches in Serbian piano music of the 19th century: Cultural connections between the public and private life (Igre i marševi u srpskoj klavirskoj muzici XIX veka. Kulturna povezanost u javnom i privatnom životu). Master thesis, Novi Sad University, Academy of Arts, pp. 42–43, 132, 135.
- Kokanović, Marijana. 2011. The social role of salon music in the life and value system of the 19th century Serbian civil society (Društvena uloga salonske muzike u životu i sistemu vrednosti srpskog građanstva u XIX veku). Ph.D. diss., Novi Sad University, Academy of Arts, pp. 49–50, 71–73, 95, 138–139, 146–147.
