= National Museum of Modern Art, Zagreb =

National Museum of Modern Art
- Nacionalni muzej moderne umjetnosti

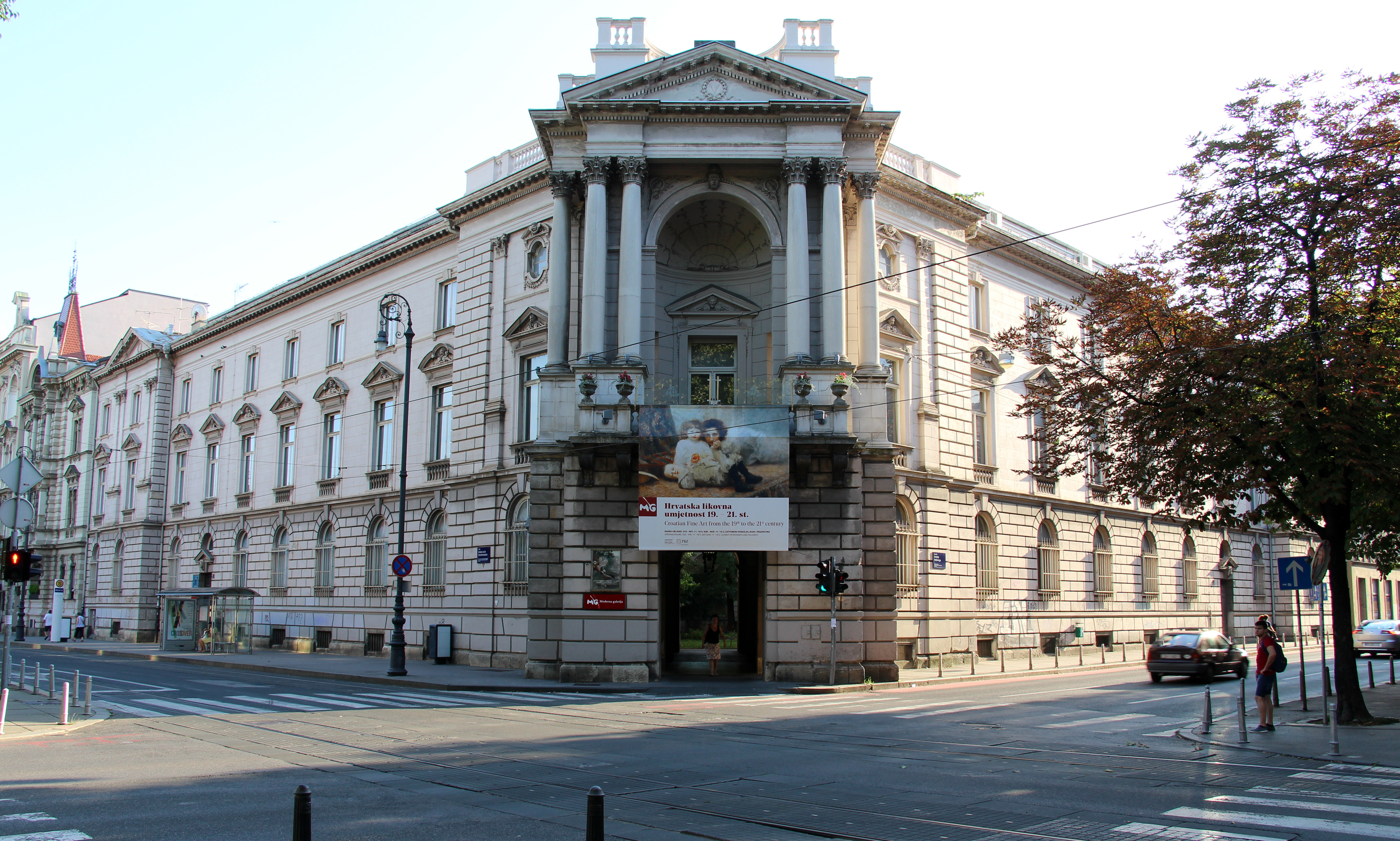
- Vranyczany-Dobrinović Palace, at the corner of Andrija Hebrang St and Zrinjevac St.
- Former name: Vranyczany Palace
- Established: 1905; 121 years ago
- Location: Andrije Hebranga 1, Zagreb, Croatia
- Coordinates: 45°48′33″N 15°58′39″E
- Type: Art museum
- Collection size: 10,000 objects
- Visitors: 76,060 (2017)
- Director: Biserka Rauter Plančić
- Website: www.nmmu.hr

Cultural Good of Croatia
- Official name: Palača Vranyczany-Dobrinović
- Type: Protected cultural good
- Reference no.: Z-334

Modern Gallery (Croatian: Moderna galerija; since 2021 the National Museum of Modern Art, Nacionalni muzej moderne umjetnosti) is a museum in Zagreb, Croatia that holds the most important and comprehensive collection of paintings, sculptures and drawings by 19th and 20th century Croatian artists. The collection numbers around 10,000 works of art, housed since 1934 in the historic Vranyczany Palace in the centre of Zagreb, overlooking the Zrinjevac Park. A secondary gallery is the Josip Račić Studio at Margaretska 3.

== History ==
The Modern Gallery, originally the National Gallery for Croatian Art, dates from the early 1900s, when it was founded by the Art Society with paintings and sculptures acquired by their members, including a donation from Bishop Josip Juraj Strossmayer. In November 1894, the Palace became the official residence of Archduke Leopold Salvator and his family. The Archduke, very popular in Croatia, was called the "Croatian Archduke". Three of his children born there and hiw wife Princess Blanca of Bourbon was known for her charity. The family moved in Vienna in 1900. Years later, in 1919, a plot to make Croatia an independent kingdom with Archduke Leopold Salvator as king failed.

In 1899, Izidor Kršnjavi, gave a presentation to the Art Society in Zagreb, with the idea of establishing the Gallery. His proposal was recorded in the Social Exhibitions Statute (Pravilnik za društvene izložbe) of 1901. In the spring of 1905, to mark the Society's 30th anniversary, three works of art were bought for the future holdings of the Modern Gallery. That year, 1905, is considered to be the official date the Gallery was founded, due to the holdings which were put together at the time. However, the collection grew gradually and it was not open for public viewing until 1914, in a single room of today's Museum of Arts and Crafts building, where it was available only to those who showed a special interest in it.

As the collection expanded, the Gallery moved to its current building, the Vranyczany Palace on Zrinjevac Park in 1934 and it has been there, with a pause during World War II, up until the present day. The Vranyczany Palace was designed by the Viennese architect Otto Hofer, and constructed in 1882 by Ferdo Kondrat for Baron Lujo Vranyczany. Since the end of 19th century the building has changed ownership frequently, and has been restored several times. Through the years, the Vranyczany building has entertained some well-known figures in Croatia's cultural, political and economic life. From its balcony in November 1884, Bishop Josip Juraj Strossmayer watched the celebrations organised in his honour on the occasion of the opening of the gallery named after him. The splendid receptions of the past have now been replaced by the contemplative atmosphere of Zagreb's gallery of modern art.

The Palace underwent a complete renovation between 1993 and 2005, when the current exhibition was opened to the public. Two floors of the palace have become a modern-equipped gallery showing the permanent collection of Croatian modern painting and sculpture. In the completely refurbished historic rooms, the Modern Gallery presents "Two Hundred Years of Croatian Fine Arts (1800-2000)", a representative selection of 650-700 of the best works by painters, sculptors and medal makers. The Modern Gallery has become the best known, and most complete Croatian modern art museum. Retrospectives and monographic exhibitions of works by the most prominent Croatian artists have been taking place there since the end of the 1960s, as well as theme exhibitions of Croatian and European modern art.

== Collection ==
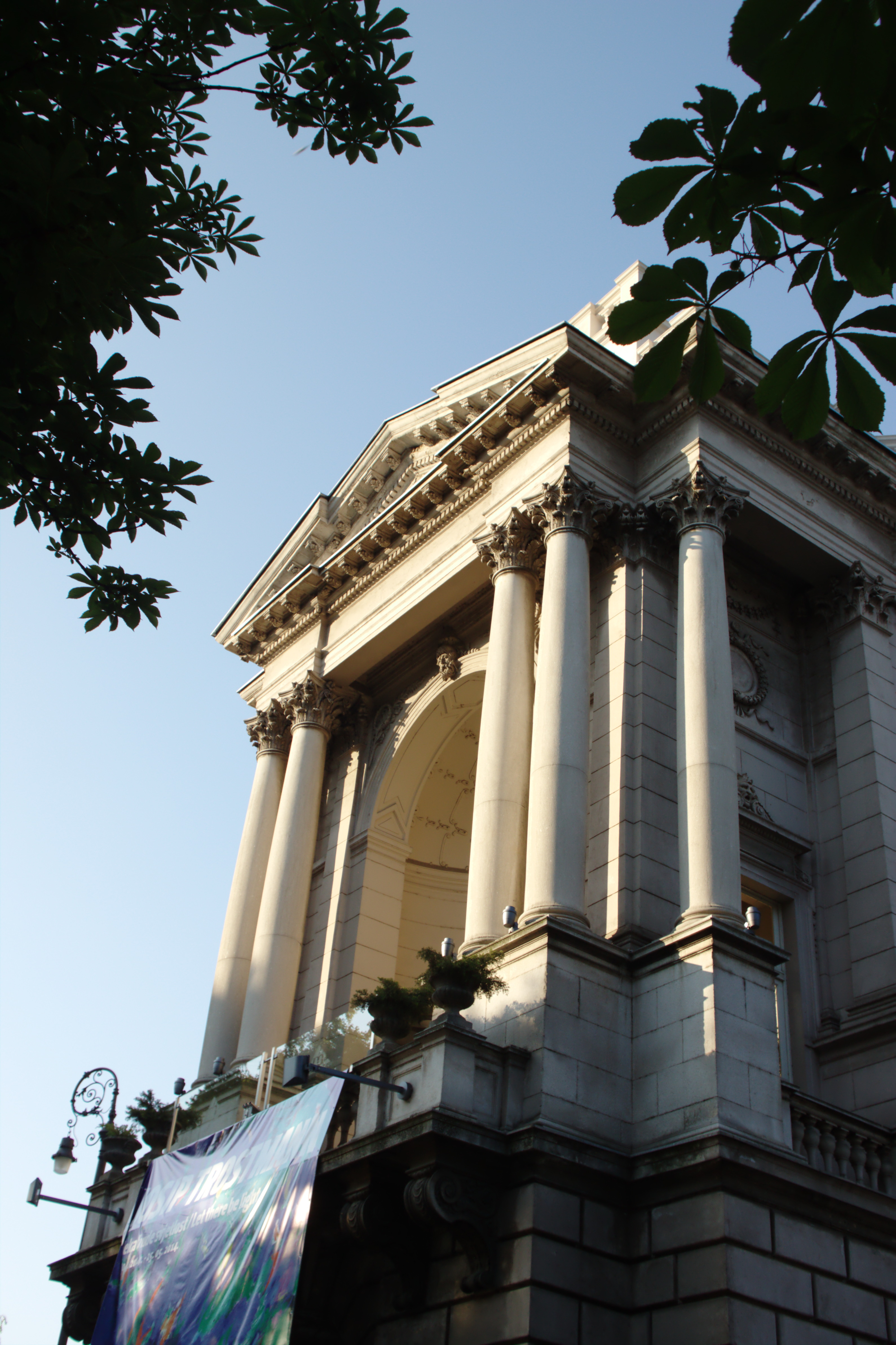
Museum Entrance

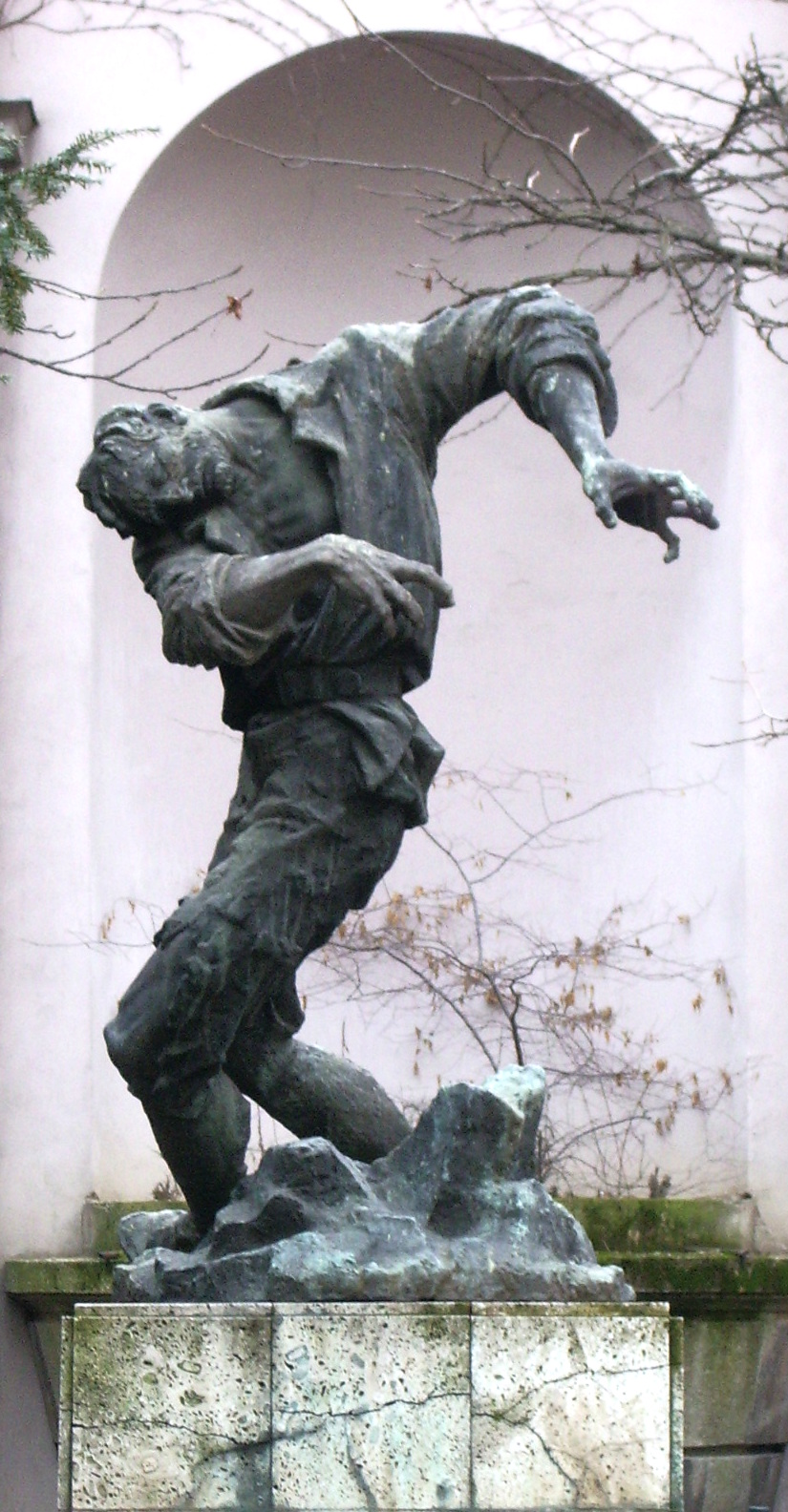
The sculpture "Ranjenik" by Vanja Radauš in the courtyard of the NMMA

The National Museum of Modern Art in Zagreb holds the richest and most important collection of Croatian art of the 19th and 20th centuries. Today the holding numbers around 10,000 works of art including paintings, sculptures, drawings and graphics, medallions and medals, as well as photographs and new media. More than 700 Croatian works of art belonging to the 19th and 20th century are on display. The exhibition extends across two floors of the Palace and the main staircase, displaying the works of individual artists, and also showing their place in the Croatian modern art scene and within modern Croatian society in general. According to Biserka Rauter Plančić, the current Director of the Modern Gallery, "The Gallery's mission is to record, as much as possible, the events and changes in Croatian art which took place over the two centuries of building and breaking down the perception of the world, as well as the perception of workmanship."

In addition to its permanent collection, the National Museum of Modern Art also holds special exhibits. In 2009, a multi-sensory Tactile Gallery MG, was opened to help vision-impaired visitors experience major Croatian modern paintings and sculptures through touch and sound. The National Museum of Modern Art holdings continue to expand and once a year, a New Acquisitions exhibition is held.

A new multi-media exhibition entitled “Ikonografija grada u hrvatskom slikarstvu u prvoj polovici 20 st.“ (Iconography of Towns in Croatian Paintings from the First Half of the 20th Century), was opened to the public in April 2010. It presents the viewer with a motif of a town in paintings, drawing, graphics, art photography; on posters and film, and in literature and music. The exhibit covers over 150 artefacts including works of the most significant Croatian artists of the 20th century, from the Munich circle to socialism and the beginnings of the abstract art.

Artists represented in the permanent collection of the National Museum of Modern Art include:

- Ljubo Babić
- Vojin Bakić
- Petar Barišić
- Ivo Deković
- Marijan Detoni
- Ivo Dulčić
- Dušan Džamonja
- Vladimir Becić
- F. Bilak
- Vlaho Bukovac
- Vladimir Gašparić Gapo
- Vilko Gecan
- Josip Generalić
- Oton Gliha
- Krsto Hegedušić
- Ljubo Ivančić
- Franz Jaschke
- Anto Jerković
- Vasilije Josip Jordan
- Leo Junek
- Vjekoslav Karas
- Ivo Kerdić
- Zlatko Keser
- Josip Klarica
- Slavko Kopač
- Kuzma Kovačić
- Miroslav Kraljević
- Frano Kršinić
- Vatroslav Kuliš
- Ferdinand Kulmer
- Ivan Lesjak
- Tihomir Lončar
- Nikola Mašić
- Ivan Meštrović
- Matko Mijić
- Karlo Mijić
- Robert Frangeš Mihanović
- Jerolim Miše
- Antun Motika
- Edo Murtić
- Sofija Naletilić Penavuša
- Zoltan Novak
- Mladen Pejaković
- Ivan Picelj
- Dimitrije Popović
- Zlatko Prica
- Ferdo Quiquerez
- Mirko Racki
- Josip Račić
- Slava Raškaj
- Ivan Rendić
- Ivo Režek
- Branko Ružić
- Đuro Seder
- Miljenko Stančić
- Milan Steiner
- Dalibor Stošić
- Mihael Stroy
- Gabrijel Stupica
- Ivo Šebalj
- Zlatko Šulentić
- Marino Tartaglia
- Marija Ujević
- Milivoj Uzelac
- Vladimir Varlaj
- Emanuel Vidović
- Zlatan Vrkljan
- Josip Zanki
- Ivan Zasche

In addition to the permanent display, occasional exhibitions of local and foreign artists are also held. For example, from December 2008 to March 2009, the first complete retrospective of Josip Račić's works was on display on the first floor of the musem; Račić is one of the most important representatives of Croatian Modernist painting.

The museum publishes monographs on artists and their works in a catalogue series called Modern Croatian Art, and in other publications.

== Gallery ==
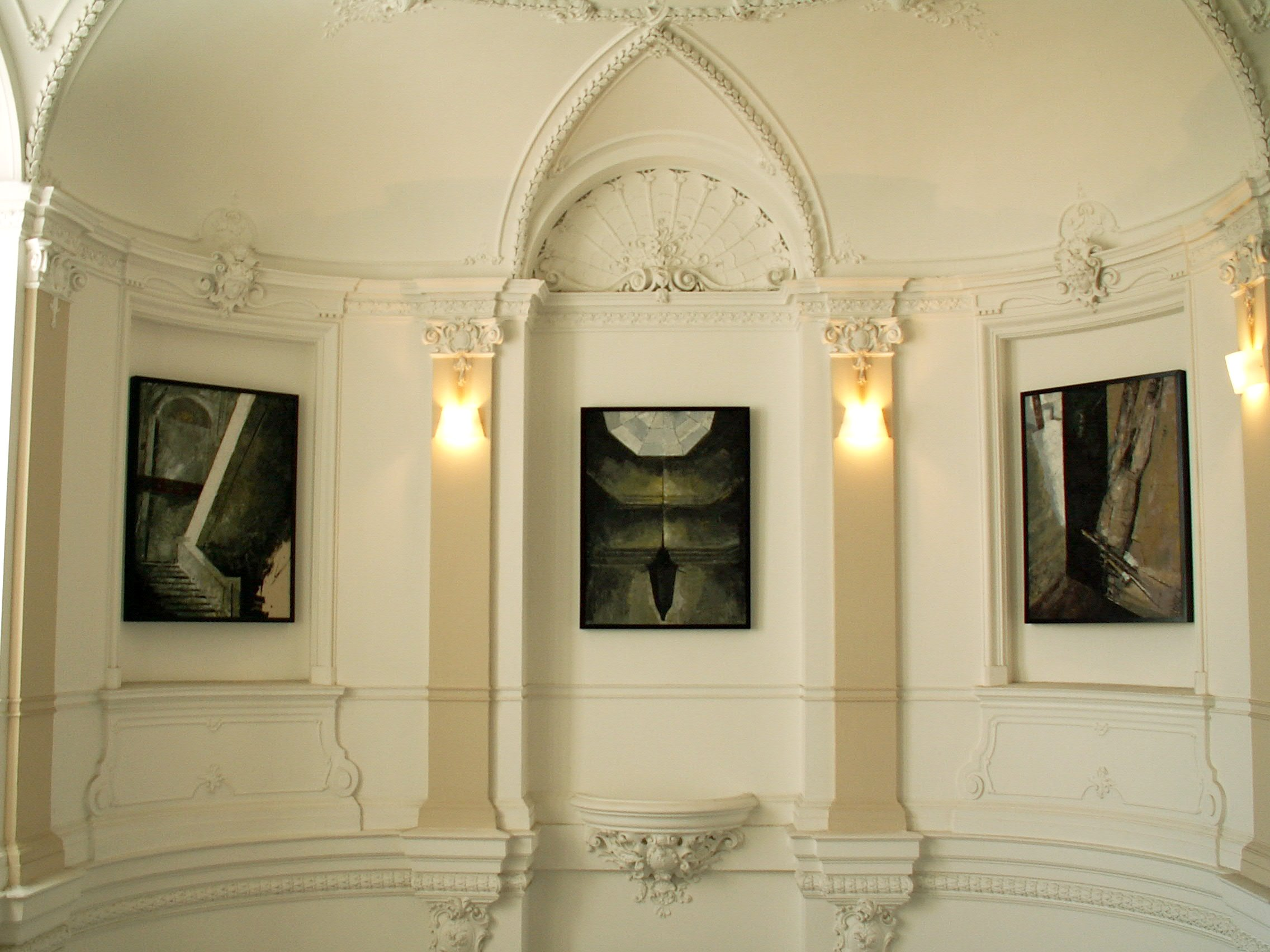
Interior

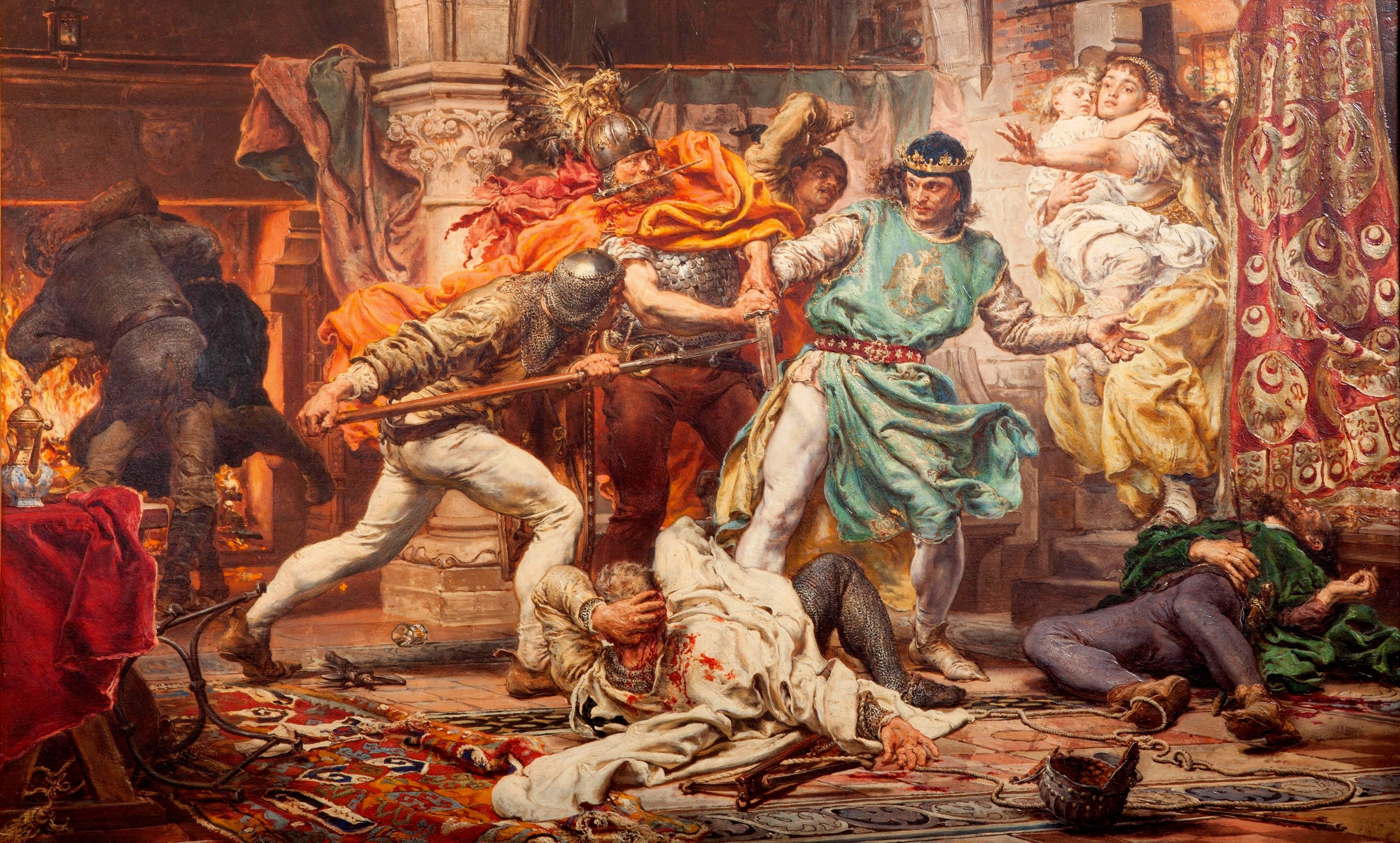
Śmierć króla Przemysła II (Death of King Przemysł), Jan Matejko, 1875

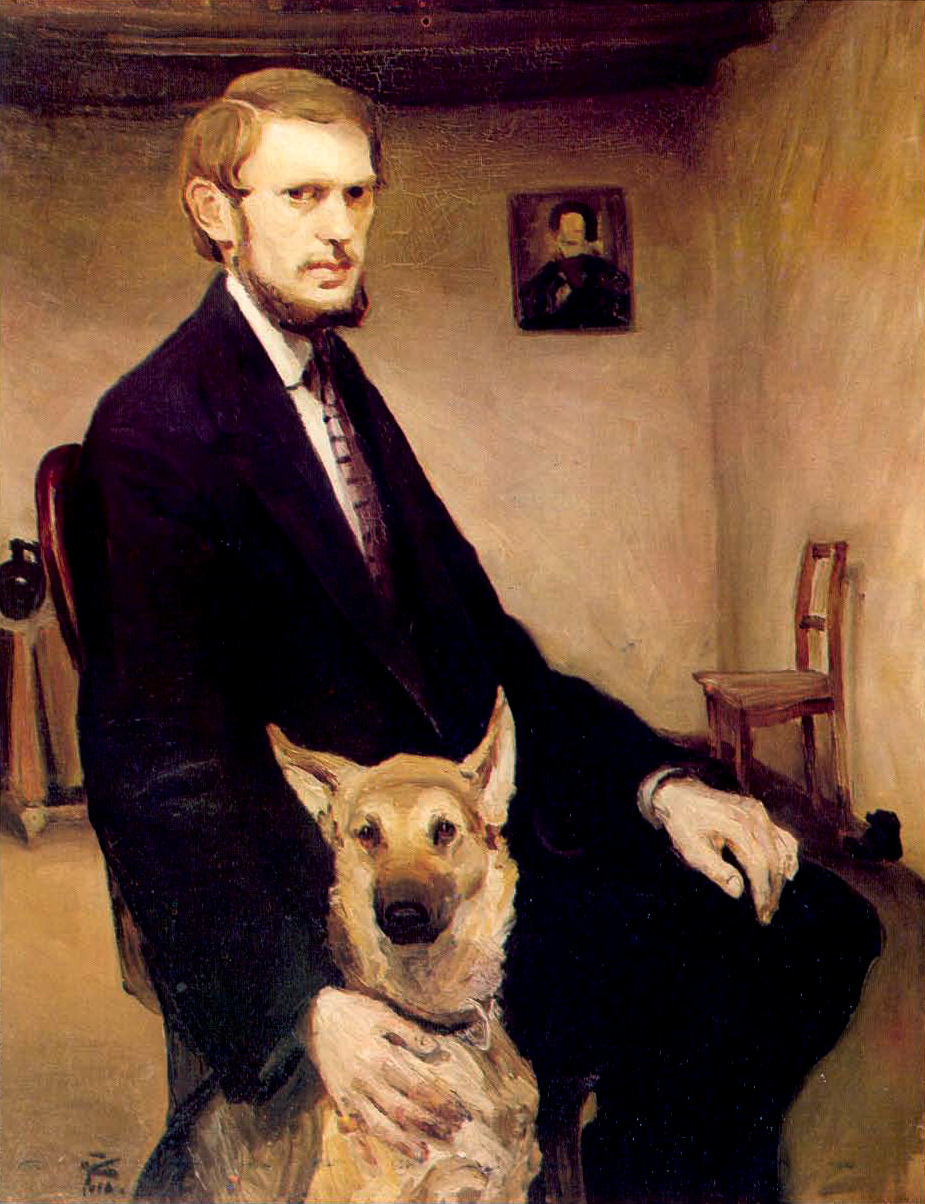
Self-portrait with a dog, Miroslav Kraljević, 1910

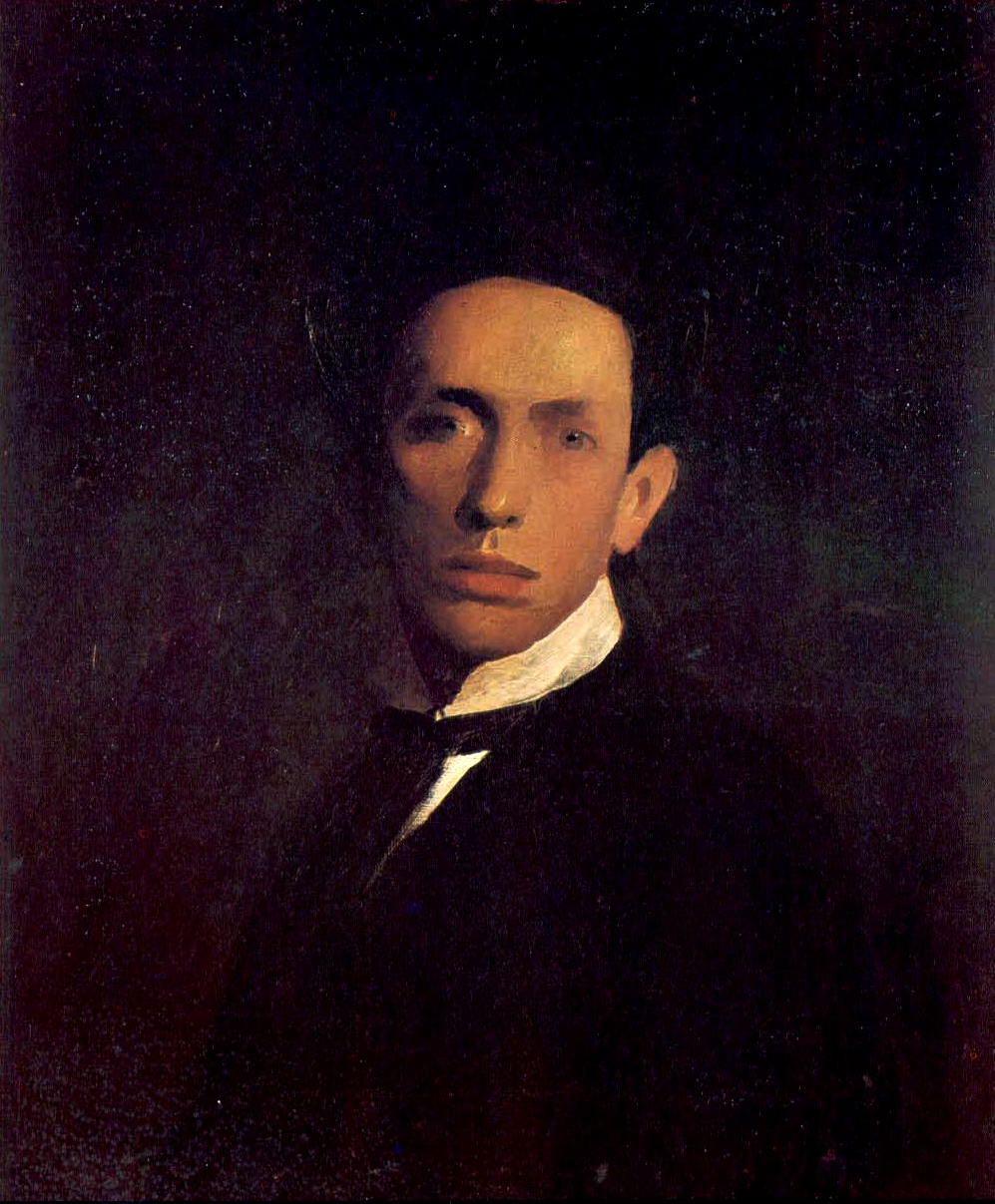
Self-portrait, Josip Račić, 1908

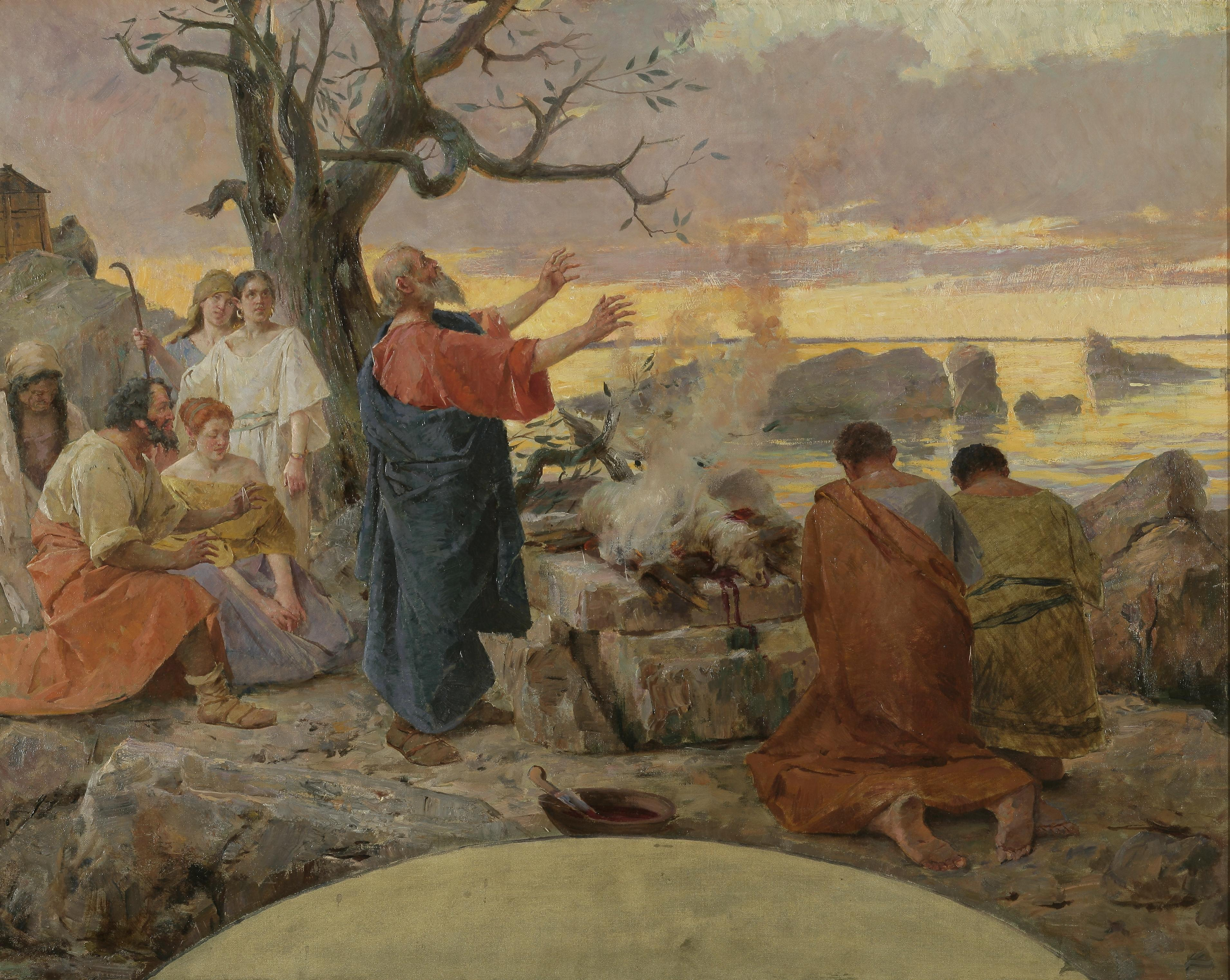
Žrtva Neomova, Celestin Medović, 1895

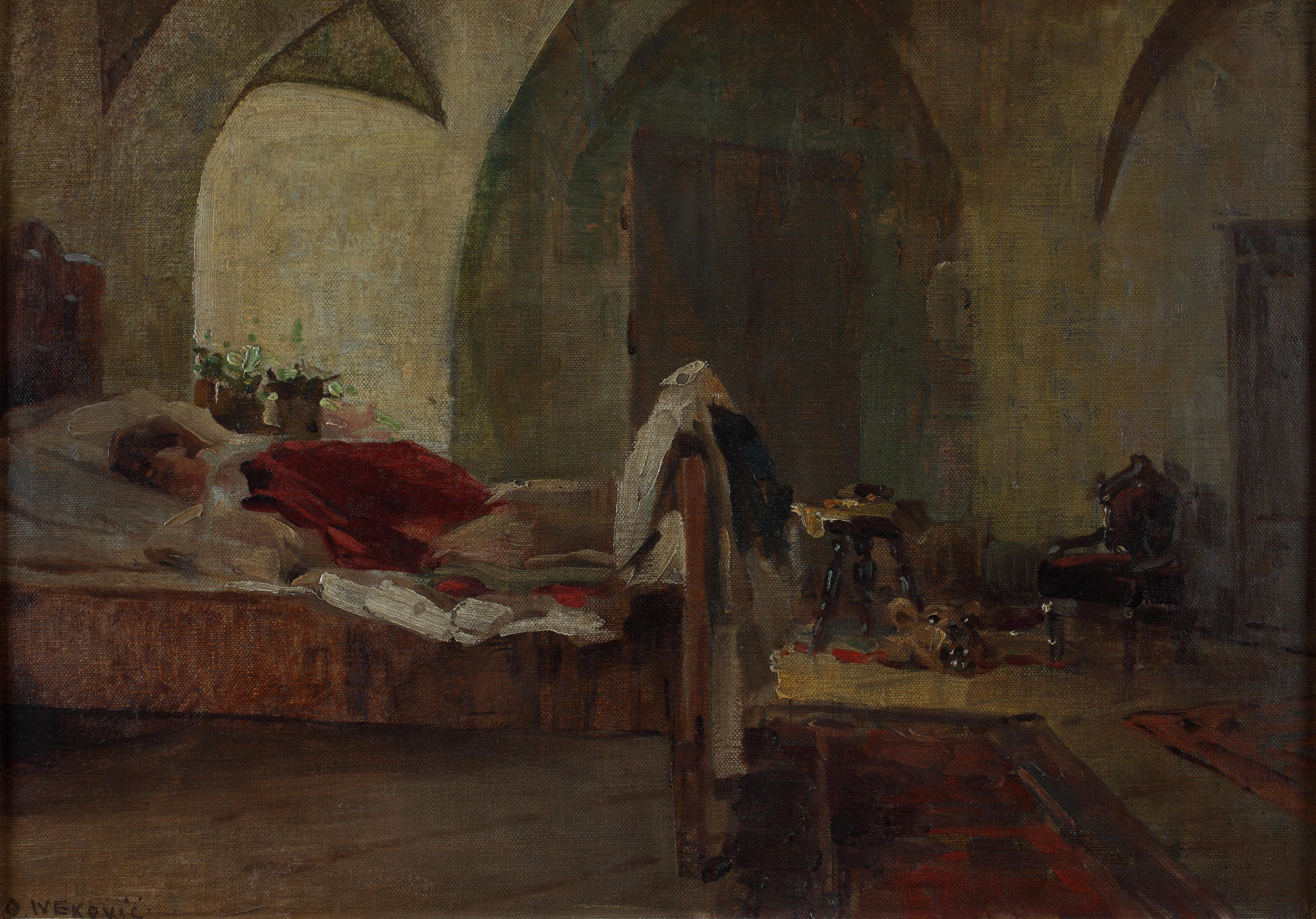
Veliki Tabor-žena u krevetu (Veliki Tabor, woman in bed), Oton Iveković, 1939

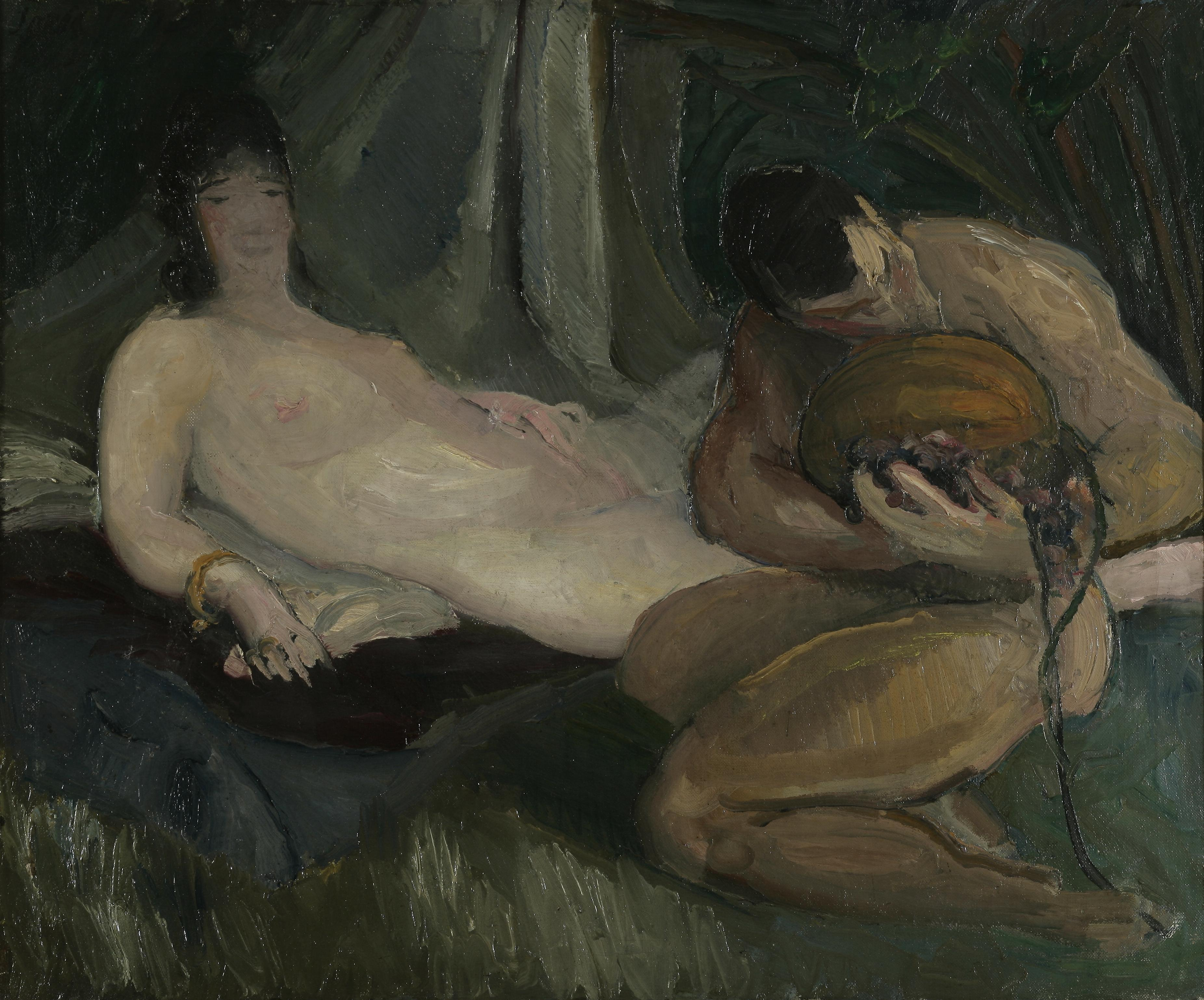
Zrelo voće (Ripe fruit), Miroslav Kraljević, 1912

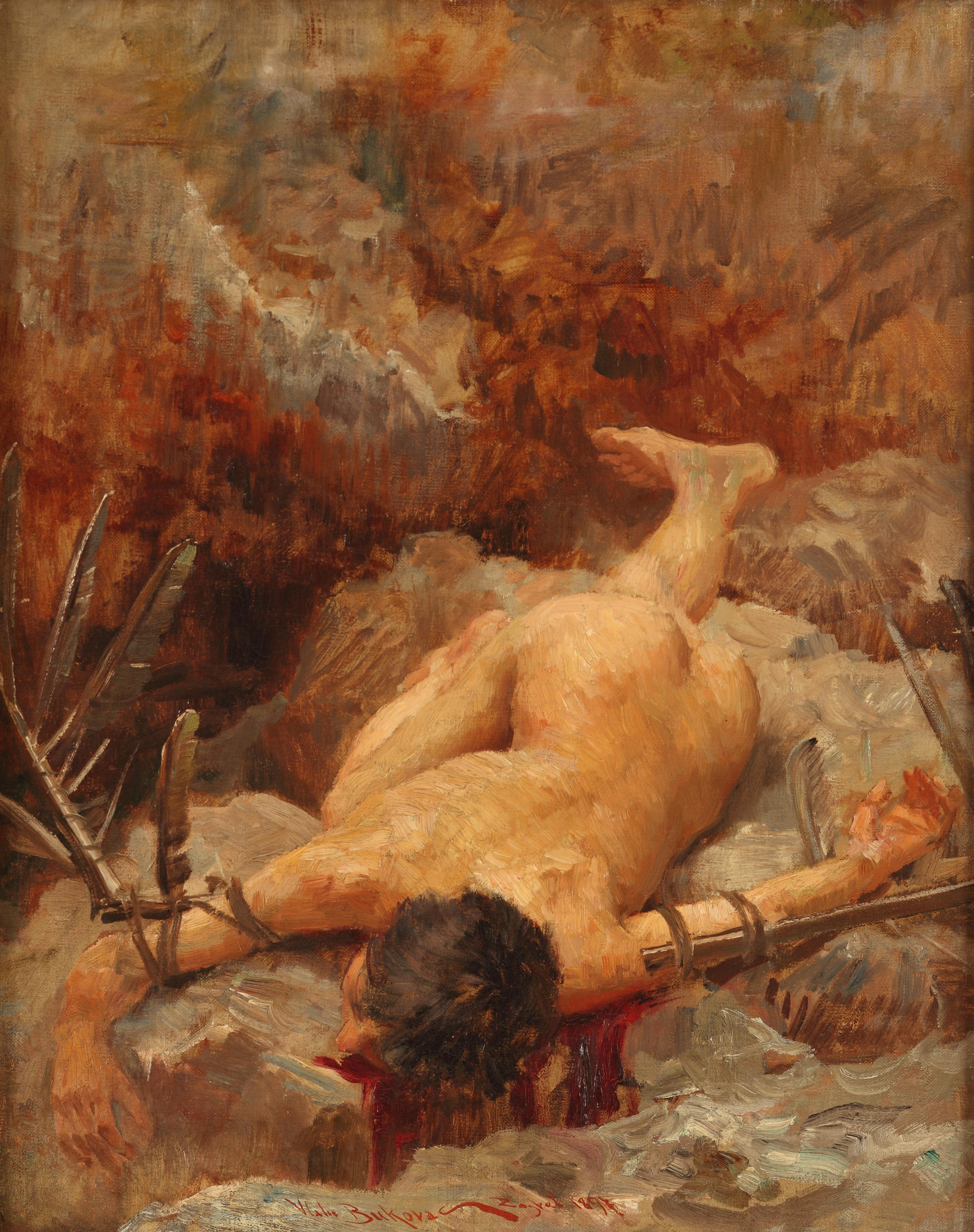
Ikar na hridi, (Ikar on the rock), Vlaho Bukovac, 1897

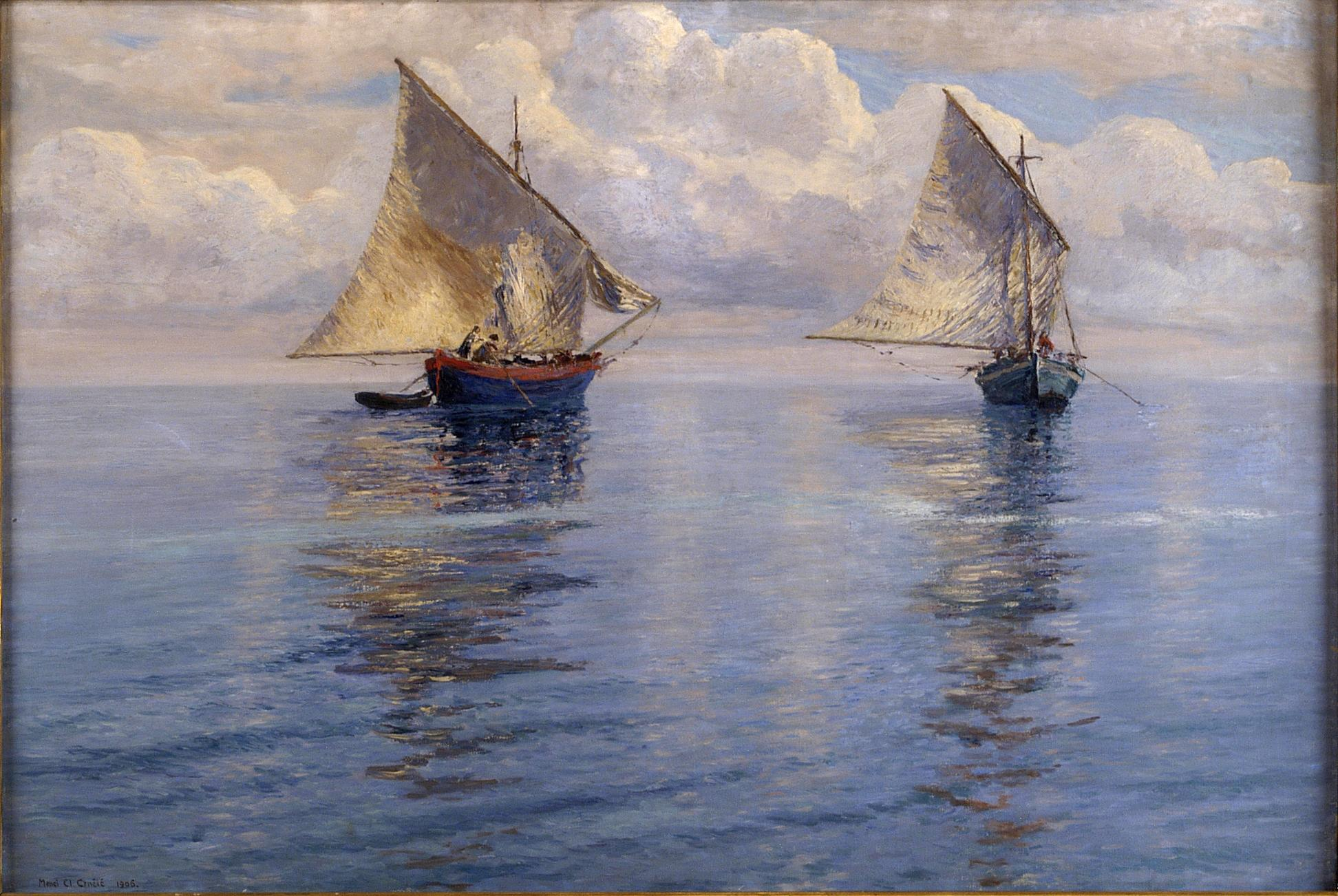
Bonaca (Calmness), Menci Clement Crnčić, 1906

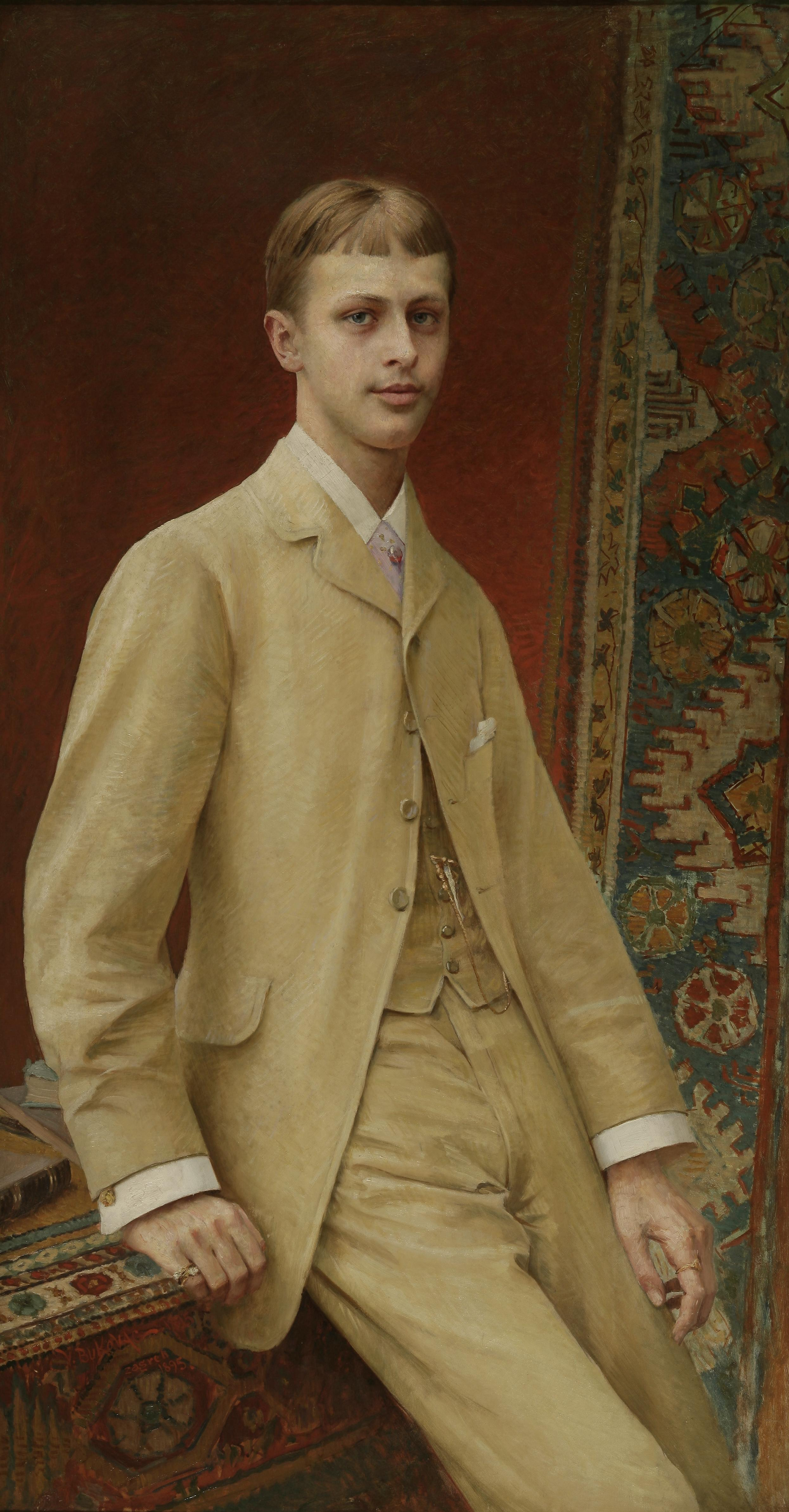
Hugo Vasilij Hoyos, Vlaho Bukovac, 1895

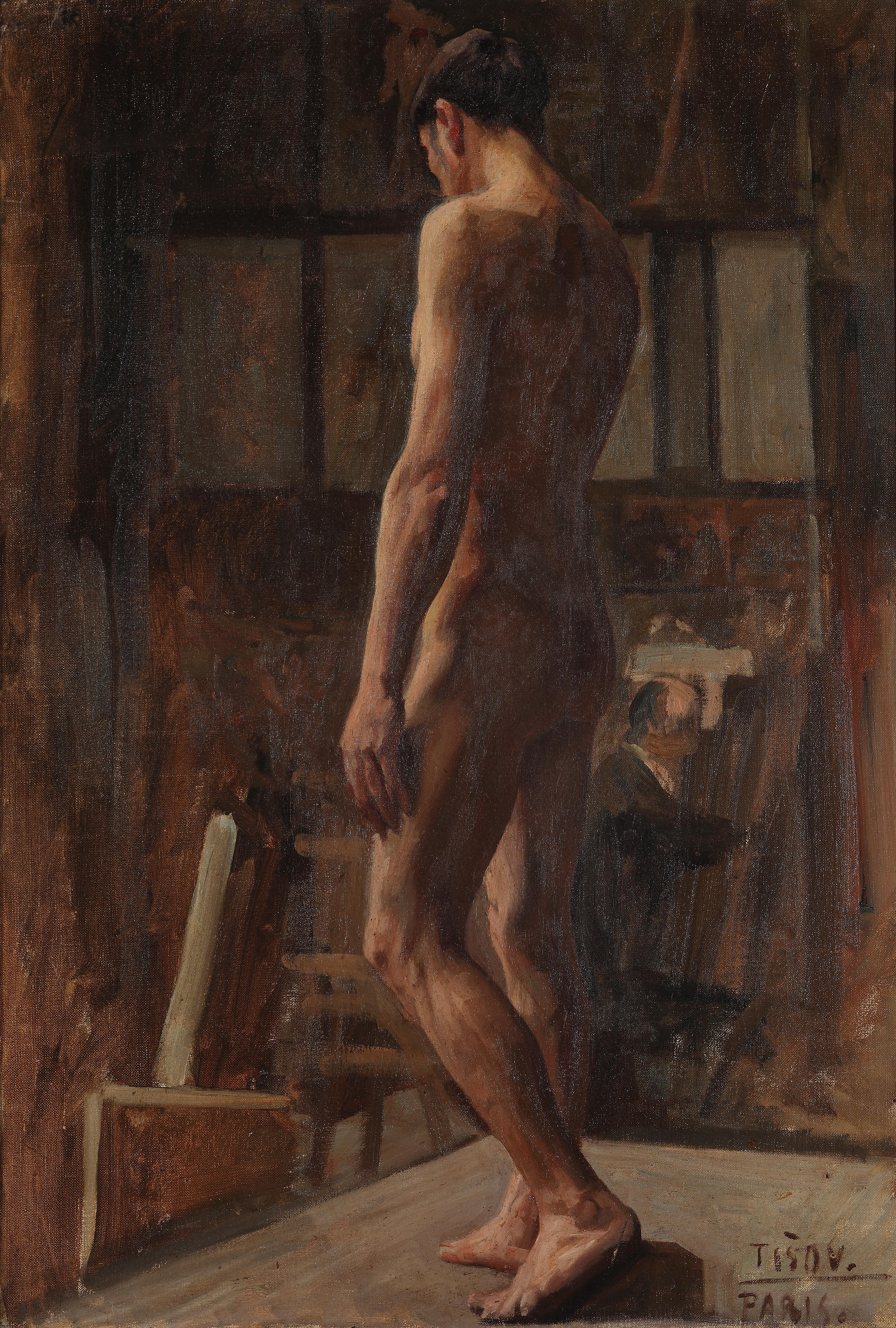
Muški akt (Man act), Ivan Tišov, 1913

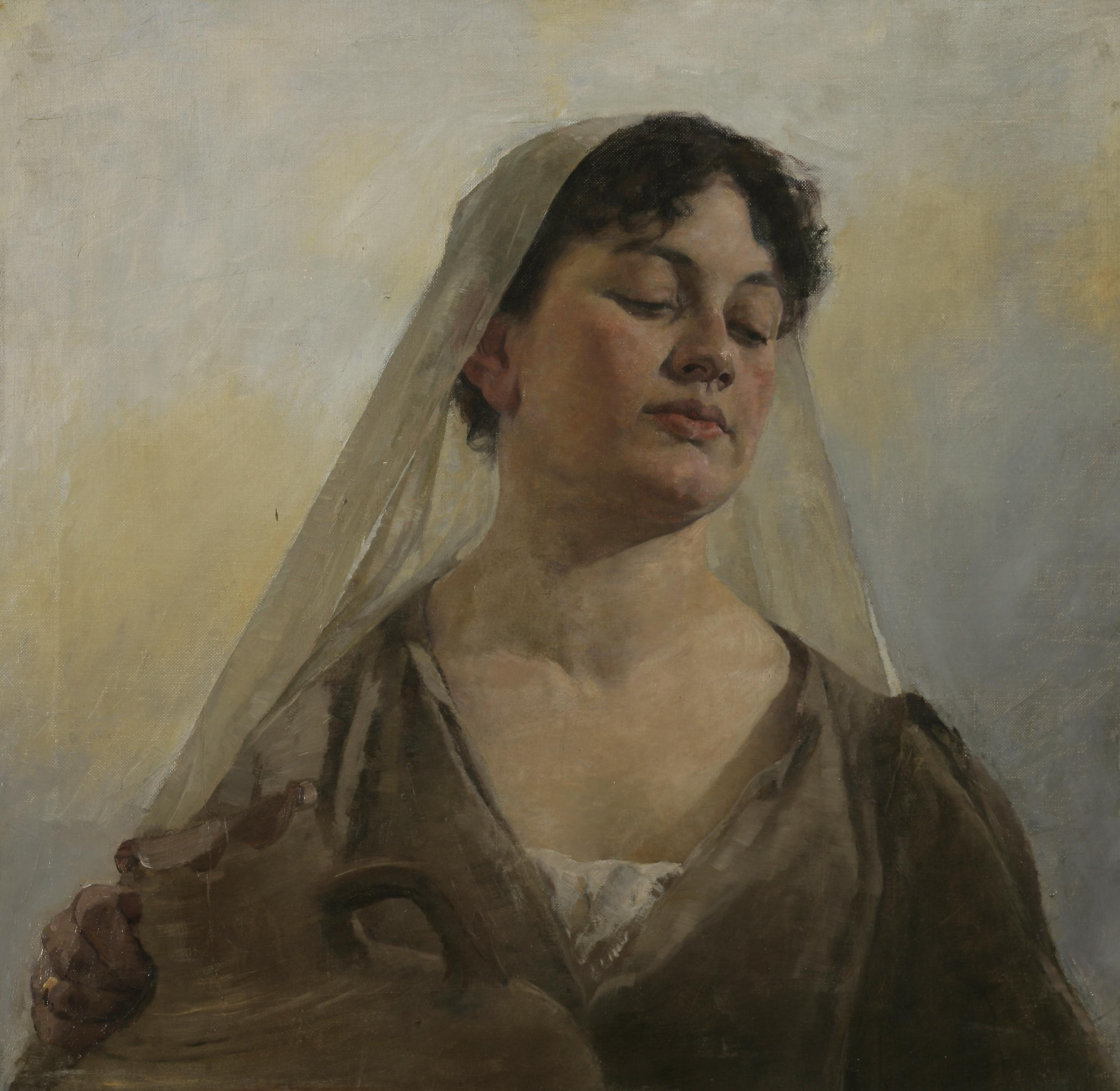
Studija Rebeke (Rebeca studies), Ivan Tišov, 1894

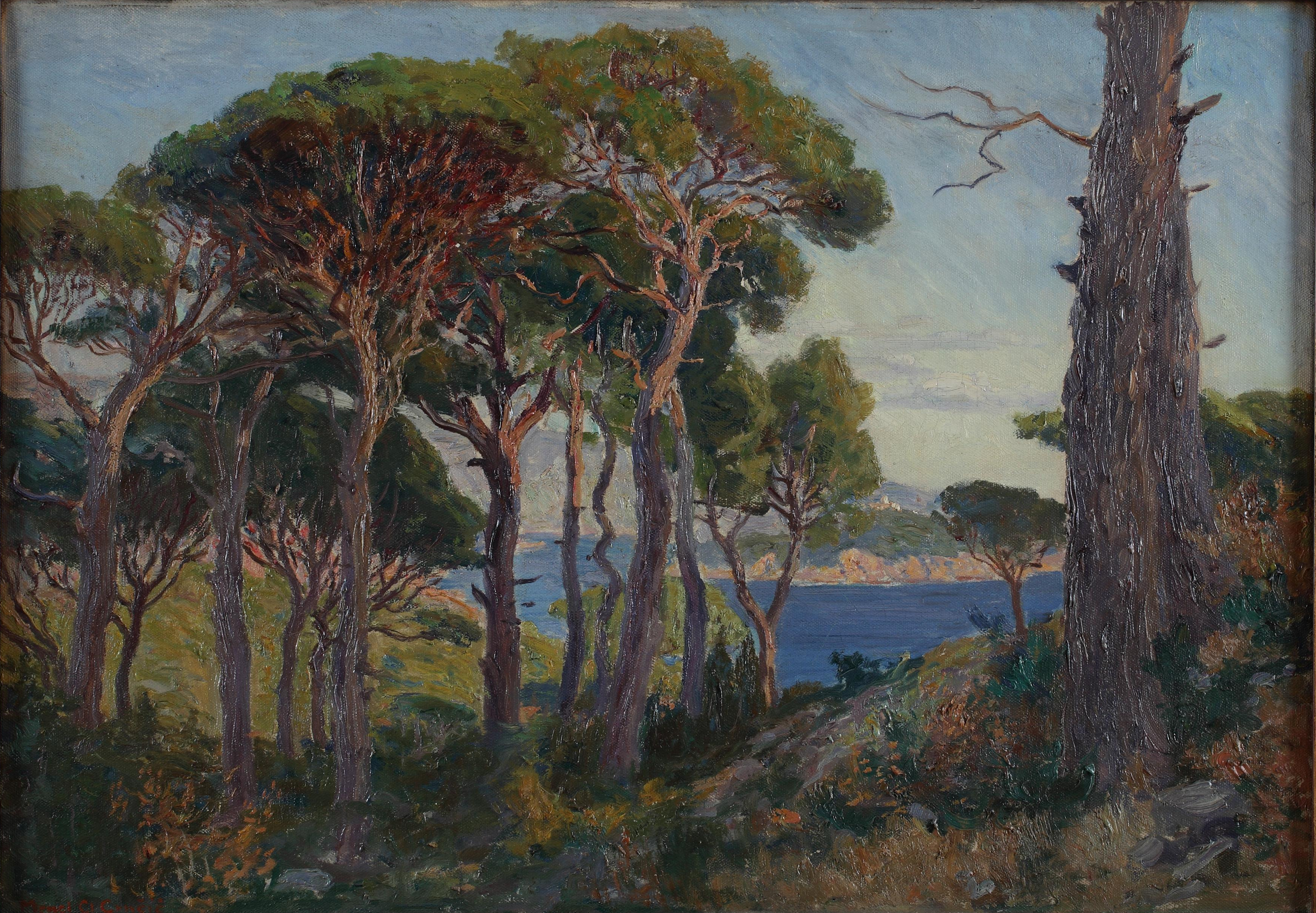
Pejzaž (Landscape), Menci Clement Crnčić, 1915 - 1920

== See also ==
- Museum of Contemporary Art, Zagreb
- The Strossmayer Gallery of Old Masters, Zagreb
- Croatian Museum of Naïve Art, Zagreb
- Art Pavilion, Zagreb
- Museum of Arts and Crafts, Zagreb
