= Josip Račić =

Croatian painter (1885–1908)

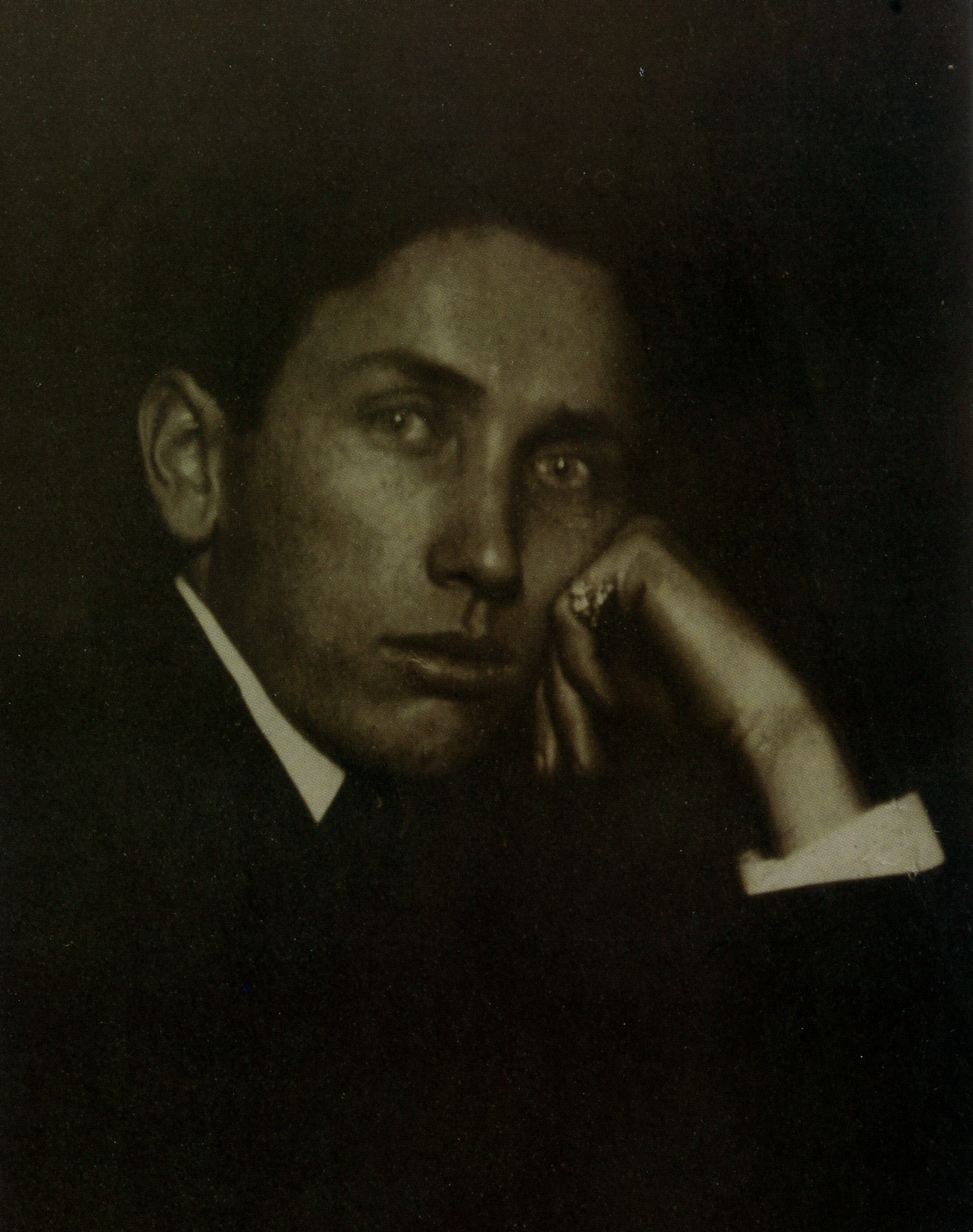
- Josip Račić, 1908
- Born: 22 March 1885; Zagreb, Kingdom of Croatia-Slavonia, Austria-Hungary
- Died: 19 June 1908 (aged 23); Paris, France
- Education: Zagreb, Vienna, Munich, Paris
- Known for: lithography, painting
- Notable work: paintings in oils and watercolour, drawings
- Movement: realism, modern

Josip Račić (22 March 1885 – 19 June 1908) was a Croatian painter in the early 20th century. Although he died very young (he was only 23), and his work was mostly created during his student years, he is one of the best-known modern Croatian painters. Today, Račić is regarded as one of the most important representatives of Croatian modern painting.

He studied lithography in Zagreb, and 1904 he went to Vienna and Munich, where he studied for a year at the school of the Slovene painter and teacher Anton Ažbe, followed by 3 years at the prestigious Academy of Arts. There, Račić, along with Oskar Herman, Vladimir Becić and Miroslav Kraljević formed the group known as the Croatian School. In 1908, he went to Paris where he painted a series of watercolors and oils depicting Parisian bridges, avenues and parks. He died by suicide with a gun in a Paris hotel room in June 1908.

Josip Račić is one of the founders of modern Croatian art, the first to bring the concept of self-awareness and artistic integrity to his life and works, "pure painting", as he called it. A particular feature of his paintings is the strong dark realms of human spirituality. A retrospective of his work was held in the Modern Gallery in Zagreb and Dubrovnik in 2008–2009, to mark the 100th anniversary of the artist's death.

== Biography ==
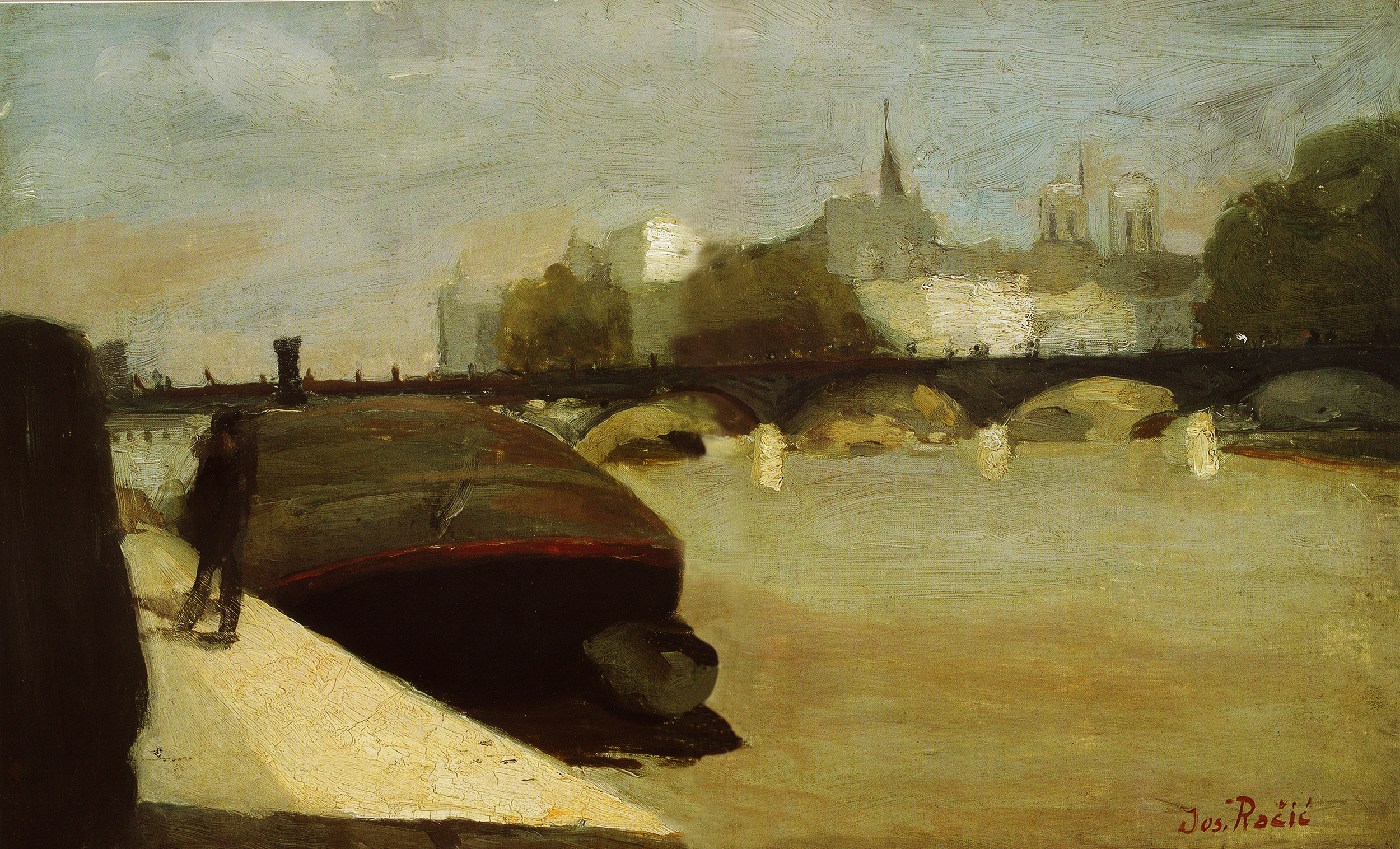
The Pont des Arts in Paris

Josip Račić was born on 22 March 1885 in Horvati, near Zagreb (today the area of Knežija and Srednjaci). From 1892 to 1896 he went to the lower town general elementary school for boys in Samostanska ulica in Zagreb (today called the Josip Juraj Strossmayer Elementary School). His elementary school drawing master was the artist Oton Iveković. From 1896 to 1900 he attended the Royal High School in Zagreb, which is now the home of the Mimara Museum.

Račić learned the trade of lithography from 1900 to 1903 from Vladimir Rožankowsky, a master craftsman and owner of a lithographic studio in Zagreb. In 1904 he went to Munich to study at the School of Anton Ažbe who very quickly noticed Račić's talents and encouraged him to go on working and studying. In 1905, Račić was briefly employed as a lithographic draughtsman in the firm of Deutsches Verlag R. Bong und Comp in Berlin, but later the same year returned to Munich and entered the Academy of Fine Arts, where he studied for three years (1905–1908) under such teachers as Johann and Ludwig Herterich, and Hugo von Habermann. At that time Munich was a center of European art scene for realism, Post-Impressionism, Symbolism and Jugendstil.

Josip Račić, along with Oskar Herman, Vladimir Becić and Miroslav Kraljević, formed the group then known as Die Kroatische Schule (The Croatian School). In Croatian art history they are referred to as the Munich Circle or the Munich Four. Their work drew much on the painting of Wilhelm Leibl and Édouard Manet (whose work they had the opportunity to see in Munich in 1907) and of older masters, the works of Frans Hals, Goya and Velázquez. Josip Račić's own work displayed strong tonal architectural qualities, with marked fullness of form and a profound psychology in the figures.

In 1908, Račić moved to Paris, where he copied works from the Louvre, painted parks, river bank and café scenes, portraits and self-portraits.

Josip Račić died of gunshot wounds in a Paris hotel room on 20 June 1908. He had committed suicide for reasons that still remain unclear.

== Legacy ==
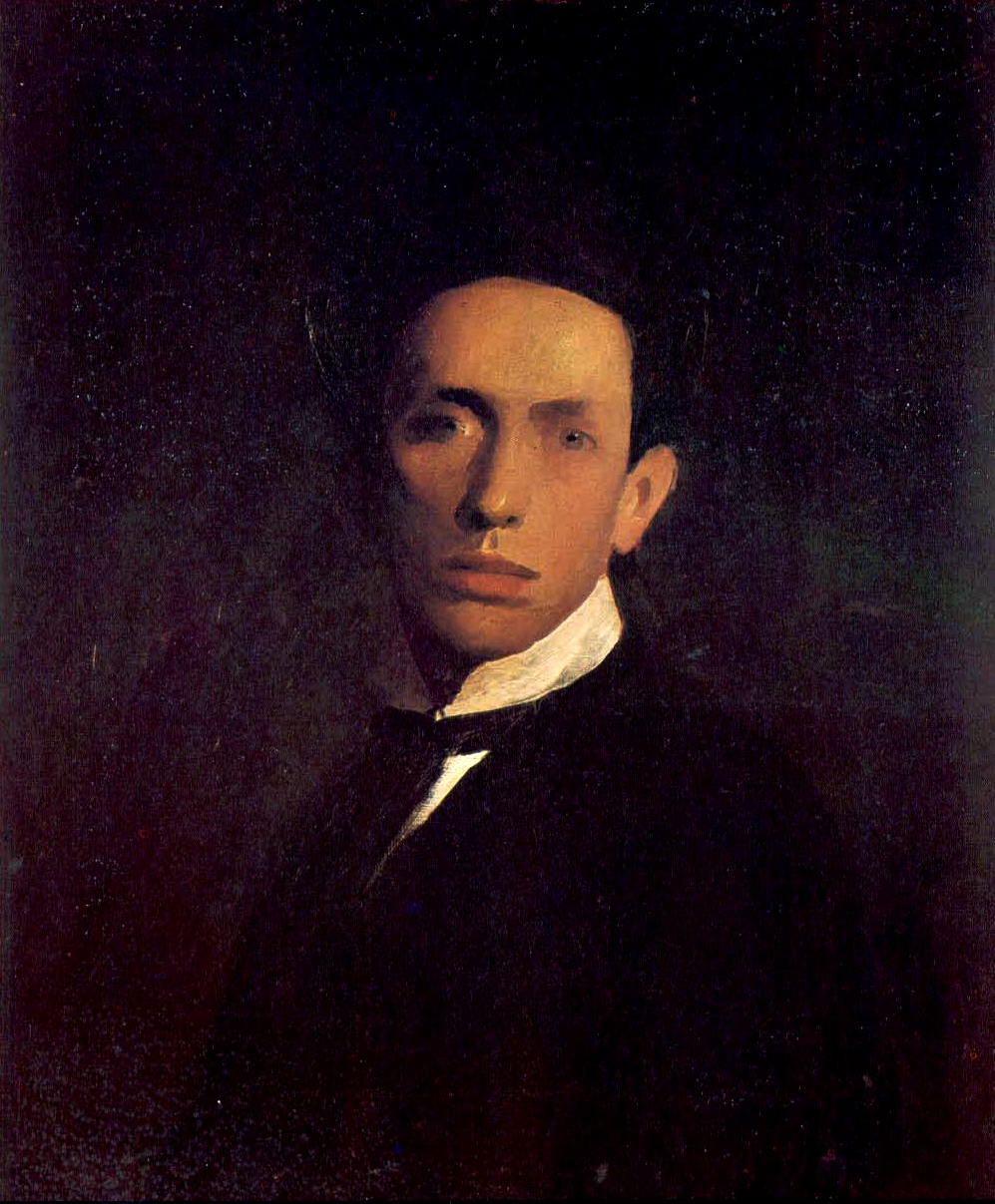
Self portrait, 1908; oil on canvas. Modern Gallery, Zagreb

Josip Račić is considered one of the greatest enigmas of Croatian modern art. From simple beginnings, he arrived in Munich, at that time one of the great creative centers of the European art scene, and found for himself inspiration in the paintings of Leibl, Manet and the Impressionists, and the tradition of Velázquez and Rembrandt. According to Miroslav Krleža, Račić was one of the first pioneers of the Munich Academy of art, his attitude is certainly important as the Leibl phenomenon in the history of German painting.

The early 20th century saw great changes in European art, and Croatian art was also taking on a new form. The Munich Four were part of the new direction, especially "J. Račić and M. Kraljević, who in their short lives succeeded in creating works pivotal to the continued development of art".

"Do not be in any doubt as to Račić's inherent artistic sensibility and the authenticity of his power to think. (...) Račić's painting is at the top the end of the development of traditional realism in the broad sense of the word. Oriented toward Manet, the idealized Goya and focused shaping of forces: the true pictorial interpretation of emotions. His work certainly stands above all" Radoslav Putar

Račić's work is extremely important for the birth of the Croatian modern art and its incorporation into European trends of modern painting.

The Josip Račić Modern Gallery Studio in Zagreb is named in honour of the artist. It is associated with the Modern Gallery, and is dedicated to the presentation of the works of Croatian contemporary artists.

== Exhibits ==
- 1920 The first solo (posthumous) exhibit of his work was arranged by Ljubo Babić in the Museum of Arts and Crafts in Zagreb.
- 1961 Modern Gallery, Zagreb Josip Račić Exhibition
- 2004 Adris Gallery, Rovinj Josip Račić Exhibition open: from 23 July – 20 September 2004. From the collection of the Modern Gallery in Zagreb
- 2008 Modern Gallery in Zagreb The first complete retrospective of works by Josip Račić, one of the most important representatives of Croatian modern painting. The most complete presentation of the oeuvre of Račić to date. It showed almost all the Račić works held in museums, galleries and privately in and outside Croatia. Also included are works recently ascribed to the great painter, works the attribution of which to Račić is still in dispute, a large selection of documentation (letters, photographs, postcards and picture postcard) as well as a selection of the works of the great world masters who were Račić's models. The exhibit included more than one hundred works, oils, watercolors and drawings. In addition to works from the holdings of the Modern Gallery, there were works borrowed from other collections by Croatian and foreign museums and private owners that provided the widest and deepest insight into the relatively meager work of the artist whose life ended in his 24th year. A significant part of the exhibition were Račić's childhood drawings, documentary materials, which completes the picture of his short but very productive life and work.
- 2009 Museum of Modern Art, Dubrovnik Josip Račić – A Retrospective Exhibition

Works by Josip Račić are on display in the Modern Gallery in Zagreb as part of its permanent collection.

== Works ==
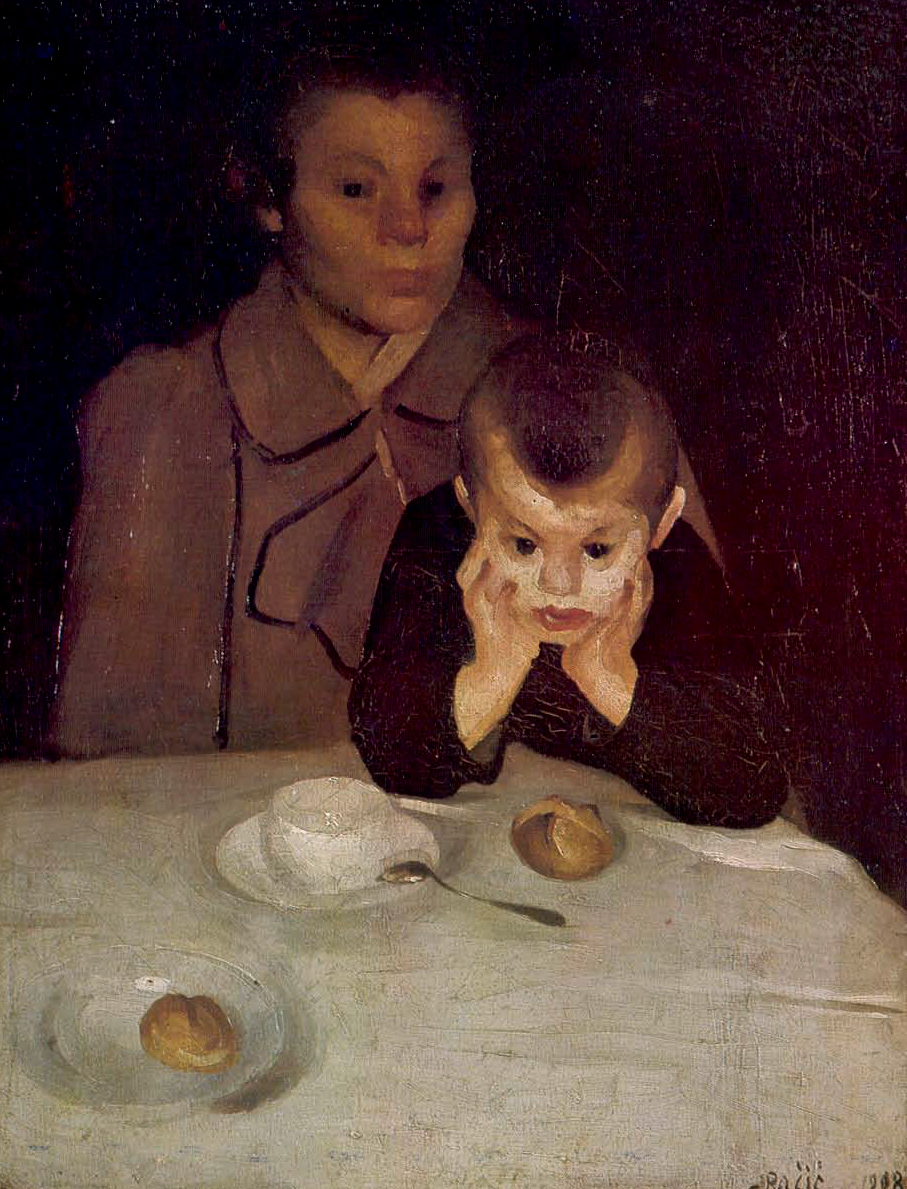
Majka i dijete (Mother and Child), 1908

- Muškarac sa šalom (Man with scarf), 1907. oil on canvas
- Portret starog prijatelja I (Portrait of an Old Friend I), 1907. oil on canvas
- Portret starog prijatelja II (Portrait of an Old Friend II), 1907. oil on canvas
- Starac u crvenom prsluku (Old Man with Red Vest), 1907. oil on canvas
- Dama u bijelom (Lady in White), 1907. oil on canvas Alternative title: Portret gospode u bijeloj bluzi (Woman in a White Blouse)?
- Gospođica u crnom (Woman in Red), 1907. oil on canvas Portret gospode u crnini (1907)
- Portret gospode sa sesirom (Portrait of Woman with Hat) (1907)oil on canvas
- Portret sestre Pepice (Portrait of Sister Pepice), 1907. oil on canvas
- Ženski akt (Female Nude), 1907. oil on canvas
- Autoportret (Self-portrait), 1908. oil on canvas
- U kavani (In the Cafe), 1908. watercolour
- Kavana na boulevaru (Cafe on the Boulevard), 1908. akvarel
- Majka i dijete (Mother and Child), 1908. oil on canvas
- Portret slikara Schuleina (Portrait of the artist Schuleina?) (1908)
- Pont des Arts (Bridge of the Arts), 1908. oil on canvas
- U parku (In the Park), 1908. watercolour
- U razgovoru (Conversation), 1908. watercolour
- Pred ogledalom (In Front of the Mirror), 1908. watercolour
- Na boulevaru I (On the Boulevard I), 1908. watercolour
- Na boulevaru II (On the Boulevard II), 1908.watercolour

== Gallery ==
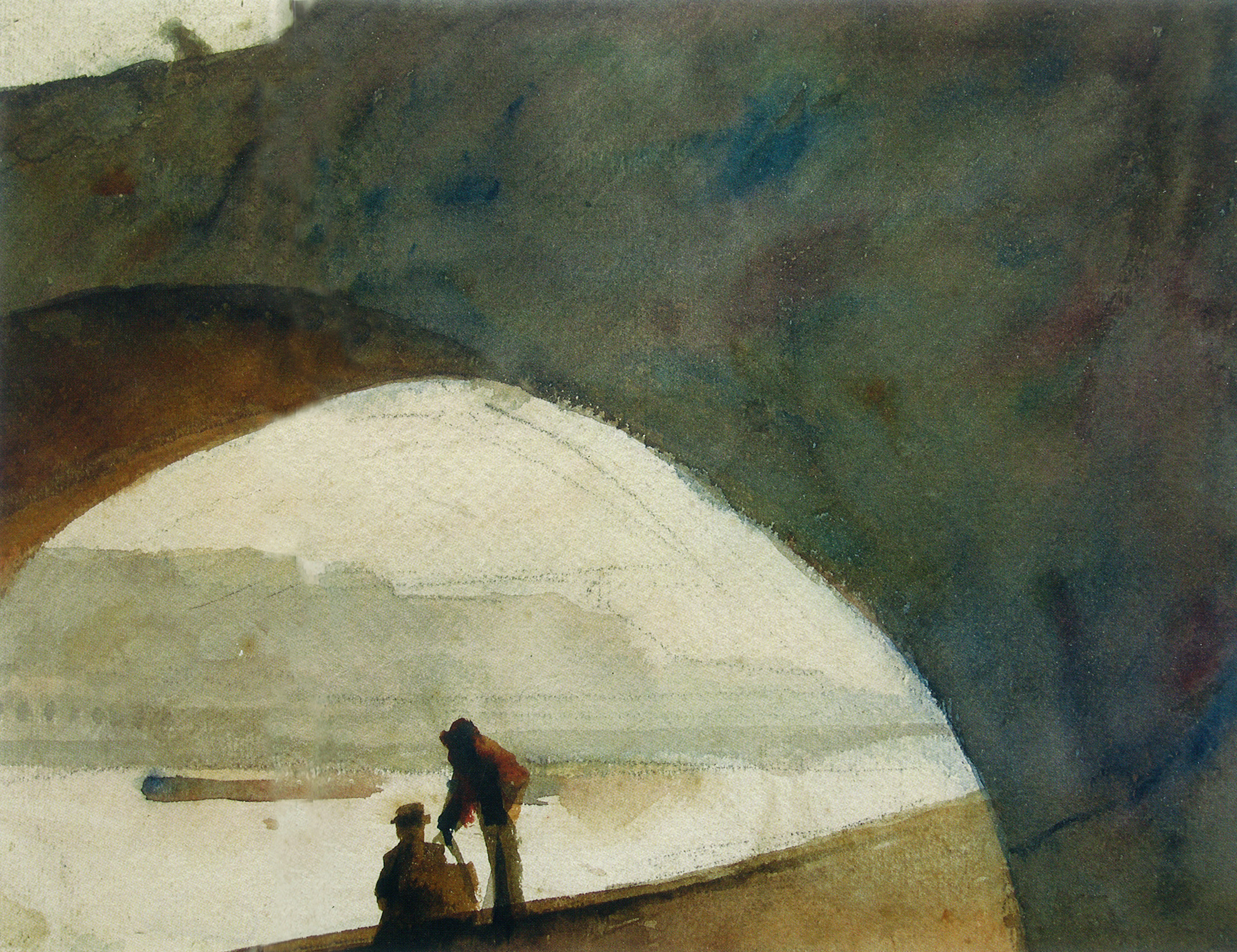
On the Seine

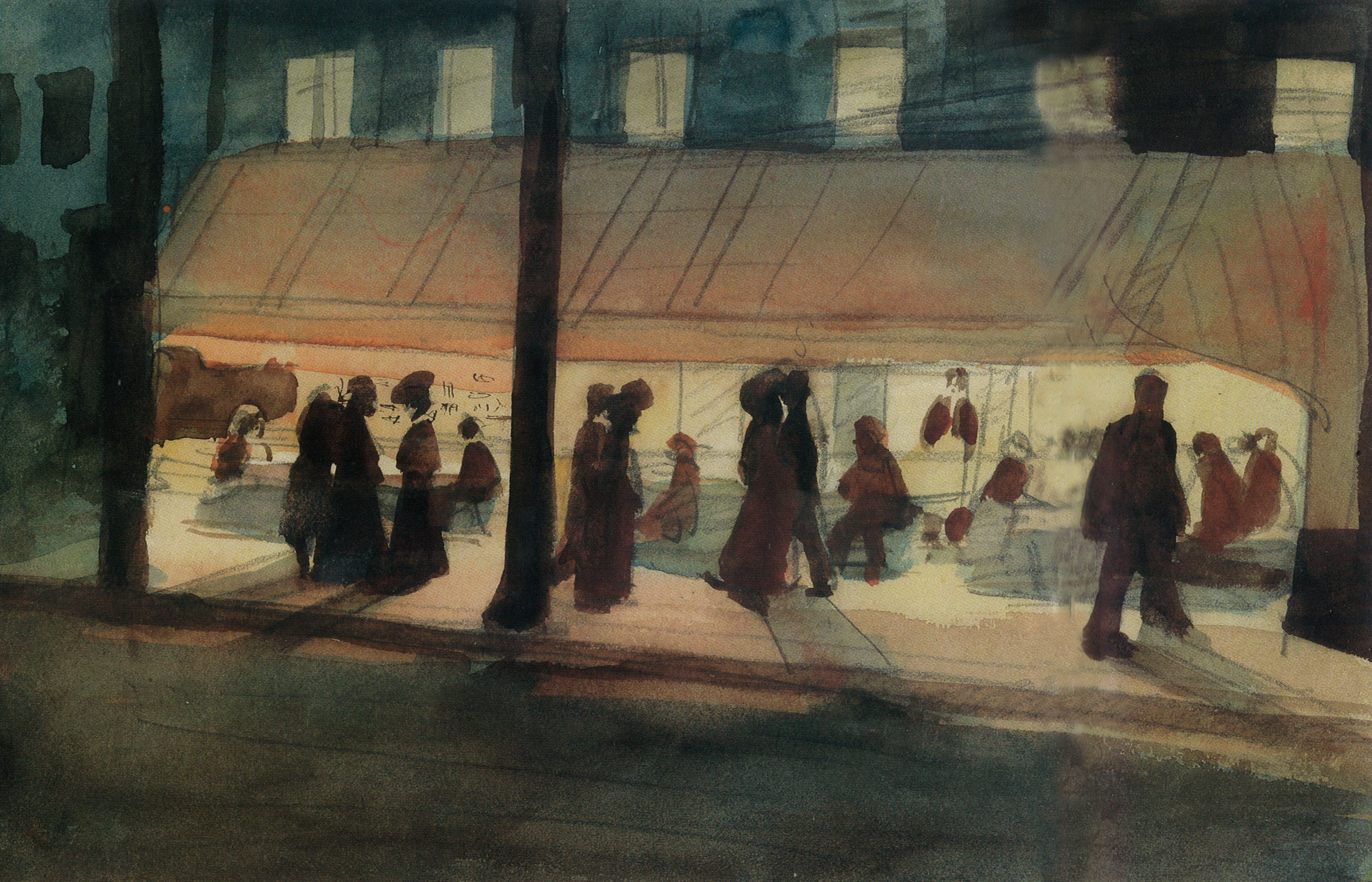
Café on the Boulevard

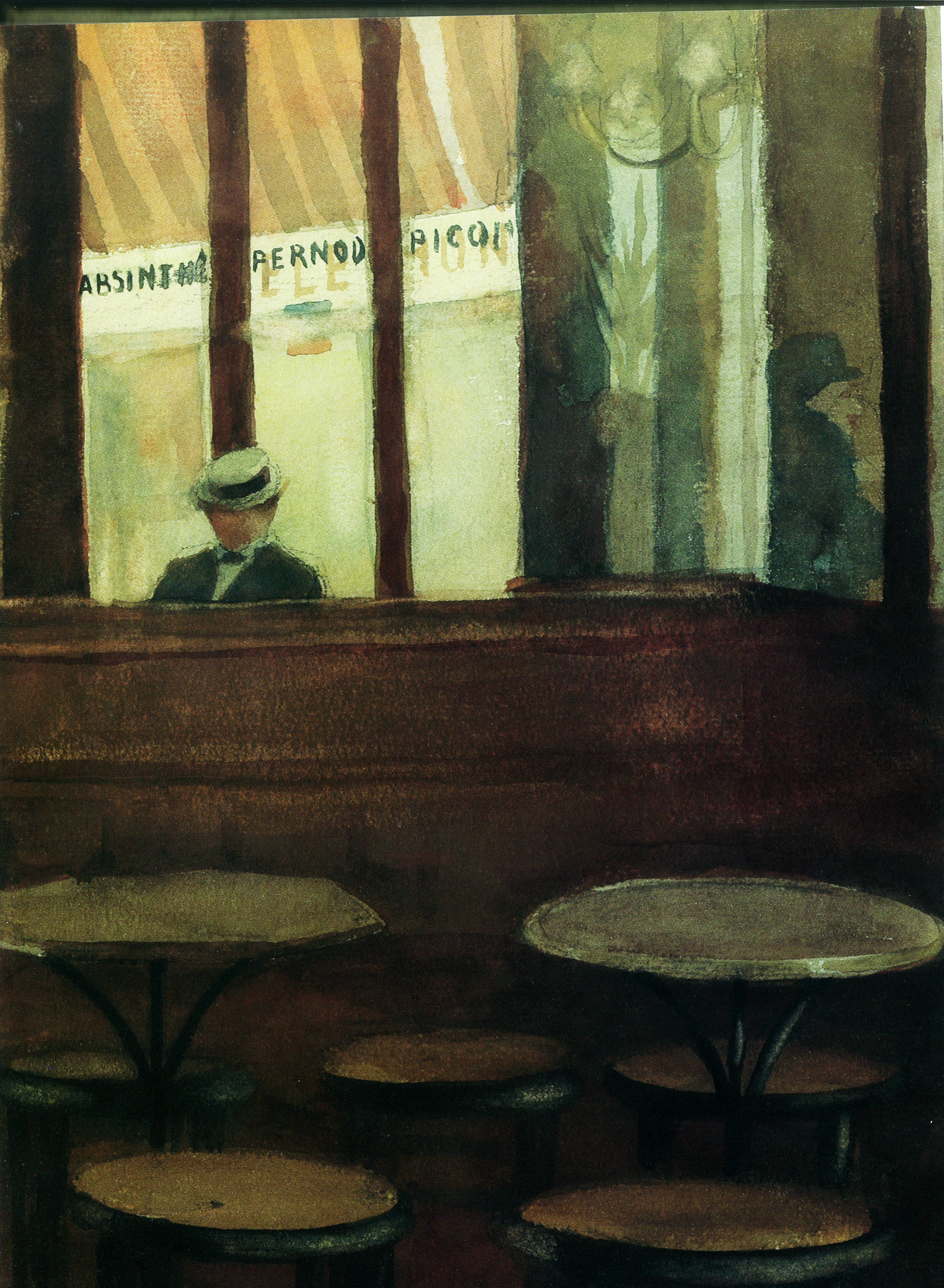
In the Café

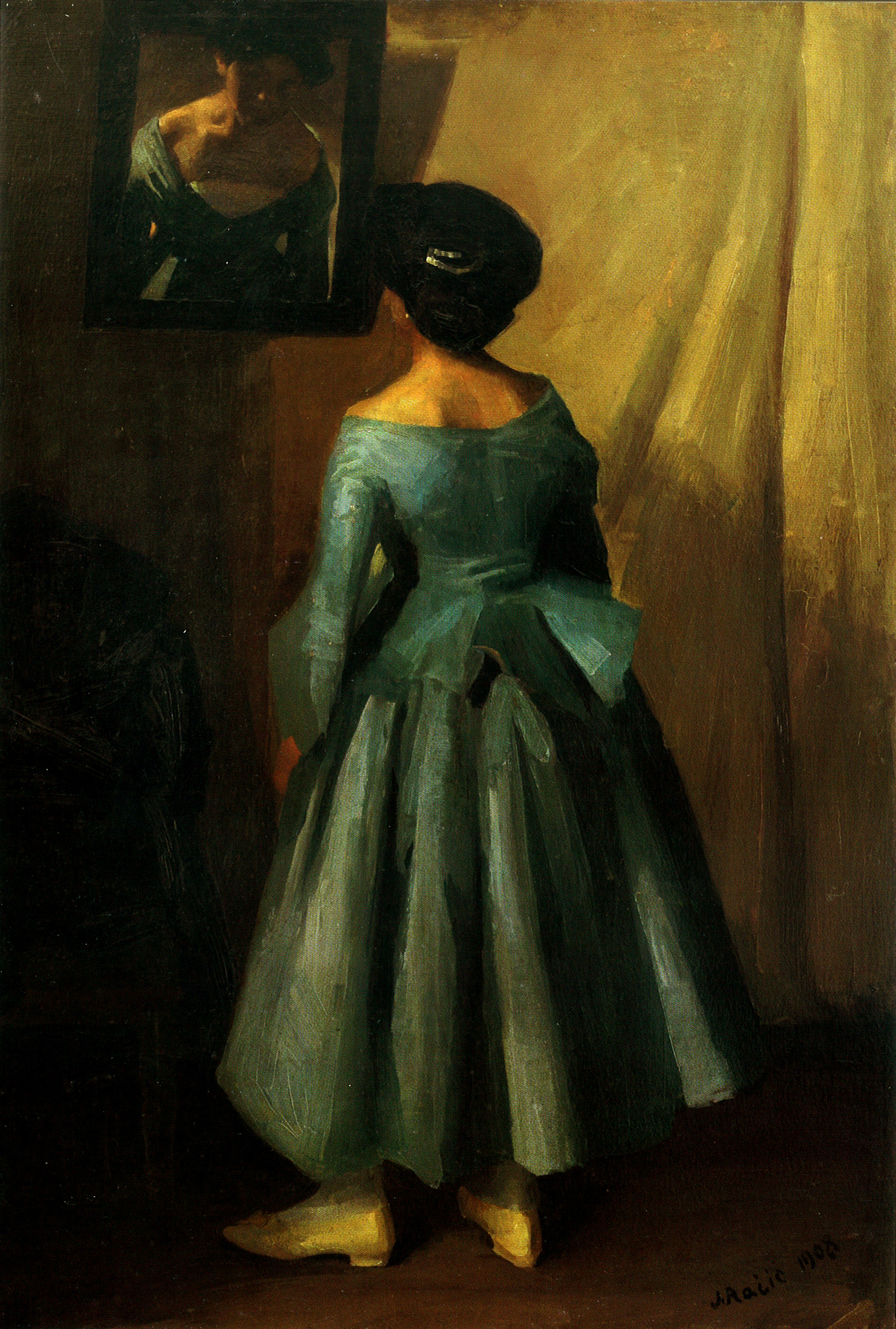
Girl in front of the mirror

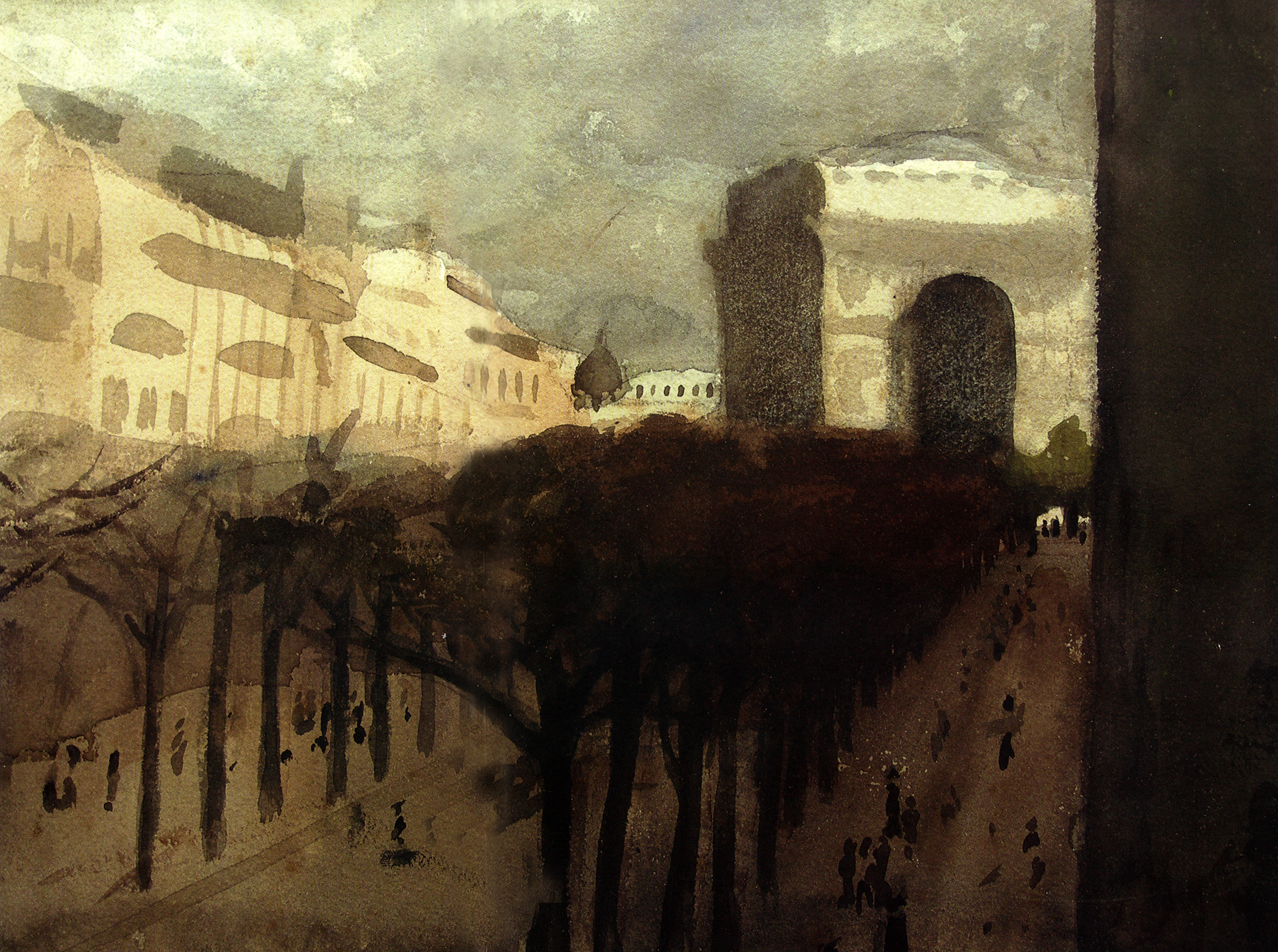
Place de l'Étoile

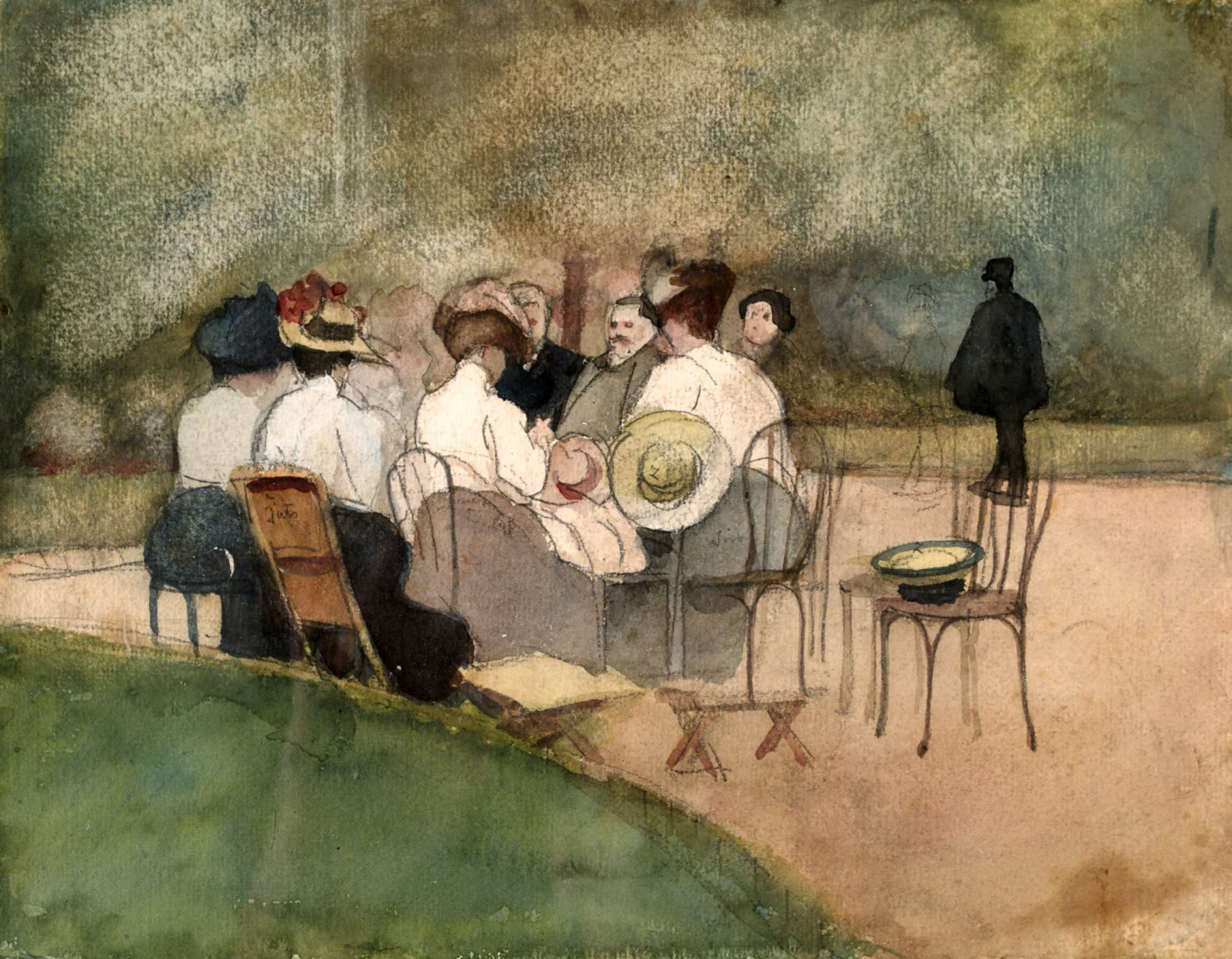
Jardin du Luxembourg

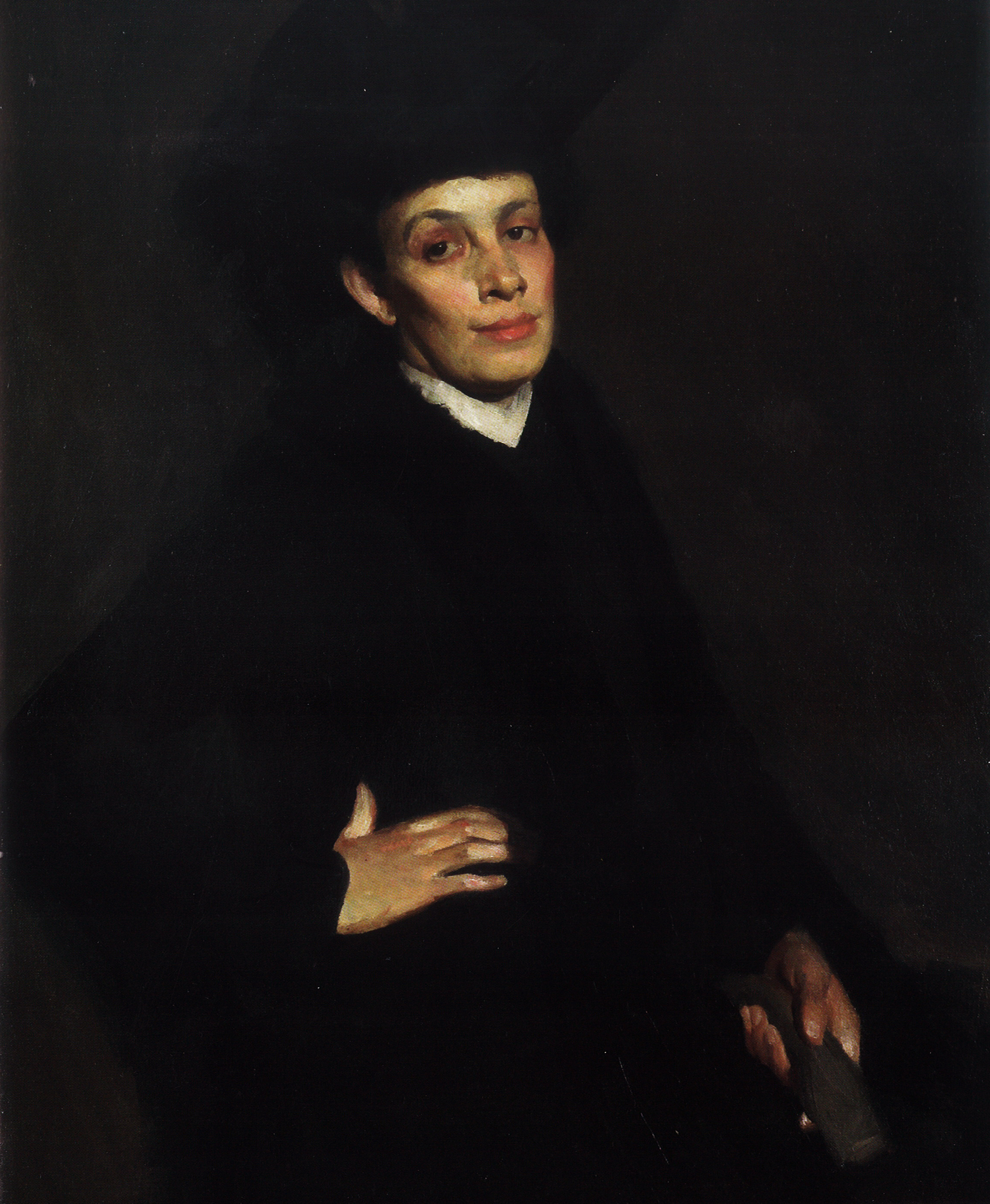
Woman in Black

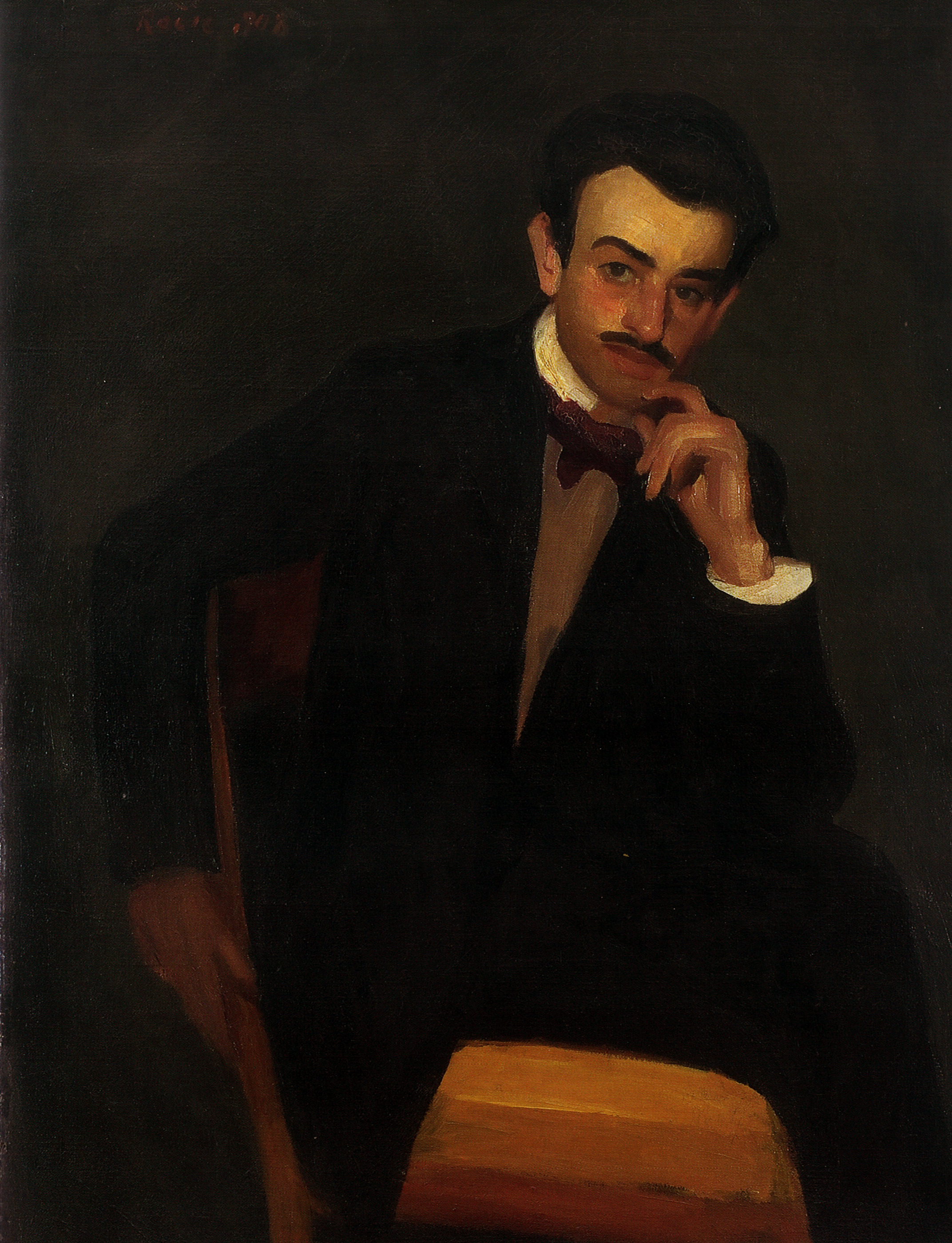
Portrait of Schüleine

== See also ==
- Pont Neuf
