= Josip Klarica =

Croatian artist

Josip Klarica (1946–2020) was a Croatian artist working in the mediums of film and photography.

== Biography ==
Klarica was born in Belgrade, PR Serbia, FPR Yugoslavia. He first studied photography and then attended the Film Academy in Prague (1975–77). As an art photographer he was interested in the history of photographic techniques and photo-chemical processes and has used old photographic techniques extensively in his work. Klarica experimented with the camera obscura and a replica of a panoramic camera (Paris, 1845) which he designed himself and adjusted to his needs. He primarily shot portraits, landscapes and still life (Slaughter, Fair, Still Life).

Klarica had many solo exhibitions in Croatia and abroad, including: The Photographers' Gallery (London, 1982), the Museum of Contemporary Art, Zagreb, 1991, Centro Culturale San Fedele (Milan, 1994), Galerie Johannes Faber (Vienna, 2002), and the Klovićevi dvori Gallery (Zagreb, 2005). His works belong to several museum and gallery collections like the International Museum of Photography at George Eastman House (Rochester), Bibliotheque Nationale de France (Paris), the Museum of Contemporary Art (Zagreb), the Museum of Arts and Crafts (Zagreb), the Musée Nicéphore Niépce (Chalon-sur-Saône), and the Modern Gallery, Zagreb.
