= Adolf Waldinger =

Croatian painter

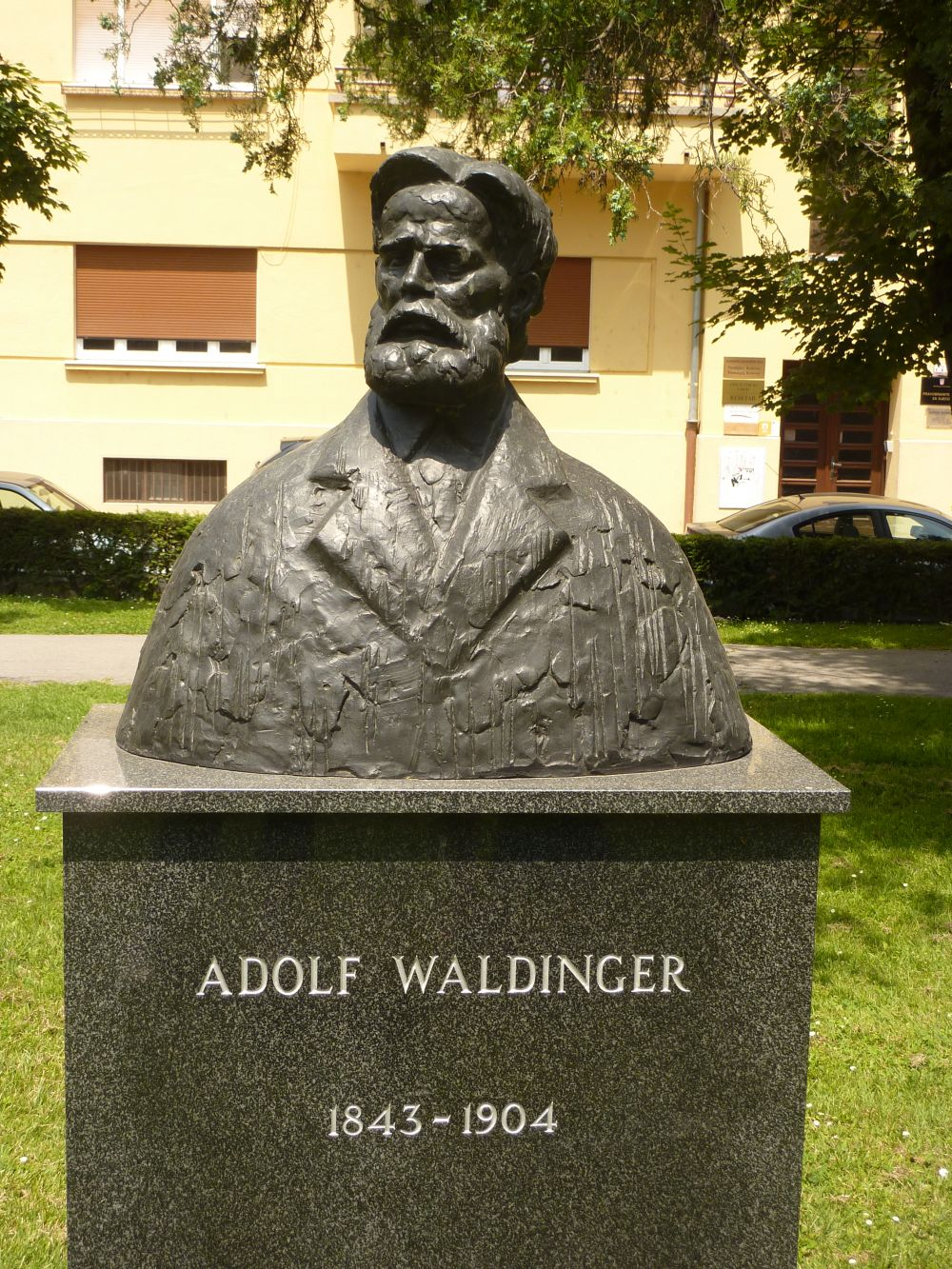
- Bust of Waldinger by Vanja Radauš
- Born: 16 June 1843; Osijek, Austrian Empire
- Died: 7 December 1904 (aged 61); Osijek, Austria-Hungary
- Known for: Painting

Adolf Ignjo Waldinger (16 June 1843 – 7 December 1904) was a painter from Osijek, Croatia of Danube Swabian origin. He was a member of Osijek's Bürgerliche Zeichenschule drawing school.

== Biography ==
Adolf Waldinger attended the art school in Osijek from 1855 to 1861. He was taught by the artists Hugo Conrad von Hötzendorf and Antun Müntzberger. In 1862 he went to Vienna to attend the Kunstakademie. On completing his studies, he worked in the studios of J. Nowopatzki, Gottfried Seelos and Joseph Sellény. In 1884 he became an art teacher at a school in Osijek, and continued until his death.

== Honours ==
In Osijek there are two institutions which are named after him: the Art Gallery and Hotel Waldinger which was opened in 1904, the year he died.
