= Izidor Kršnjavi =

Croatian painter, art historian, curator and politician

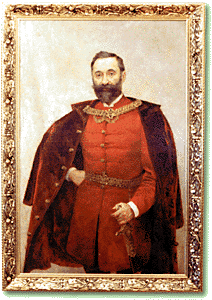
- Portrait of Izidor Kršnjavi by Vlaho Bukovac
- Born: 22 April 1845; Našice, Kingdom of Slavonia (now Croatia)
- Died: 3 February 1927 (aged 81); Zagreb, Kingdom of Yugoslavia (now Croatia)
- Education: University of Vienna; Munich Academy of Fine Arts; University of Zagreb
- Political party: Croatian-Hungarian Party (1884–1897); Party of Rights (1897–1927)

Izidor (Iso) Kršnjavi (Croatian pronunciation: [krʃɲǎːʋi ǐzidor]; 22 April 1845 – 3 February 1927) was a Croatian painter, art historian, curator and politician.

== Biography ==
Born in Našice, his first art lessons were obtained in Osijek, where he studied with Hugo Conrad von Hötzendorf. He then went to Vienna to study philosophy and art history. At this time, he was already providing aesthetic and philosophical articles to Croatian journals. He later studied at the Academy of Fine Arts, Munich and lived in Italy from 1872–77, where he copied the old masters.

With the help of Josip Juraj Strossmayer, who he had met in Rome, he became a professor of archaeology and art history at the University of Zagreb. The next year, he helped establish the Society of Arts, and was, for many years, it secretary and spokesman. He also served as the first Director of the Strossmayer Gallery of Old Masters and was one of the founders of the Museum of Arts and Crafts.

Kršnjavi was instrumental in bringing Herman Bollé to Croatia in the 1870s.

In 1884, he came into conflict with Strossmayer and his supporters in the People's Party, where he supported the pro-Hungarian faction, which allowed him to serve in the Croatian Parliament 1884-87. From 1887 to 1891, he studied law and became the Minister of Education and Religion in the Károly Khuen-Héderváry administration. While in that office, he established several schools, including one for the blind and deaf, introduced physical education classes and helped to form the foundation for a unified school system. He had to leave the ministry in 1897, after a protest in which he burned a Hungarian flag. He returned to the University and, in 1906, joined the Party of Rights. Shortly thereafter, he began painting again.

In addition to being a painter and critic, he also translated Dante's Divine Comedy into Croatian and was the author of poems, travelogues and two novels. He died in Zagreb.

In Croatian film Countess Dora (1993) he is played by Relja Bašić.

== Works ==
- Lepoglavska monstranca (1879)

== Sources ==
- Damjanović, Dragan (2006). "Biskup Strossmayer, Iso Kršnjavi, Herman Bollé i izgradnja zgrade kraljevske velike gimnazije u Osijeku" [Bishop Strossmayer, Iso Kršnjavi, Herman Bollé, and the Construction of the Greater Royal Gymnasium in Osijek]. Peristil - Journal of Art History (in Croatian) (49). Zagreb: 129–150. ISSN 0553-6707.
- Damjanović, Dragan (January 2009). "Iso Kršnjavi i opremanje đakovačke katedrale" [Iso Kršnjavi and the Equipping of Đakovo Cathedral]. Papers and Proceedings of the Department of Historical Research of the Institute of Historical and Social Research of Croatian Academy of Sciences and Arts (in Croatian). 26. ISSN 1330-7134.
