= Hugo Conrad von Hötzendorf =

Croatian painter and art instructor of German ancestry

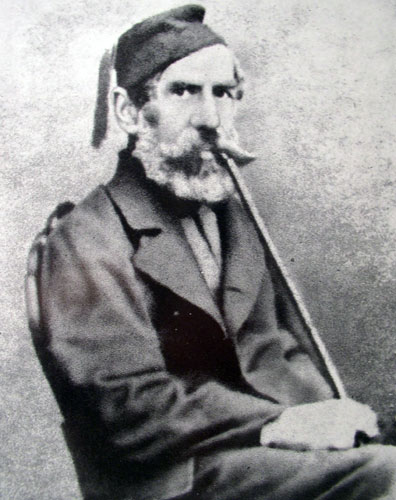
Hugo von Hötzendorf (date unknown)

Hugo Conrad von Hötzendorf (c. 1806 - 28 February 1869, Osijek) was a Croatian painter and art instructor of German ancestry.

== Life and work ==
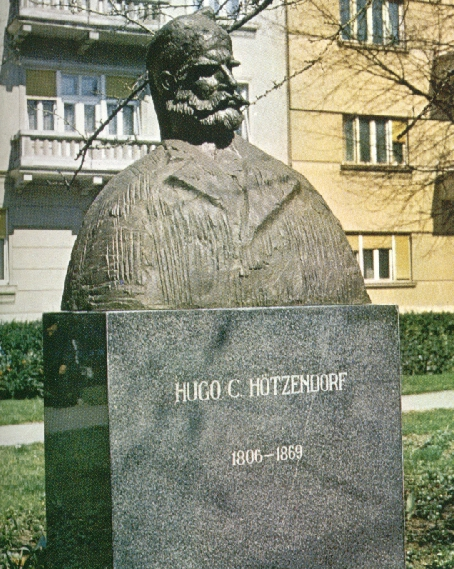
Bust of Hugo von Hotzendorf in Osijek

Hugo Conrad von Hötzendorf was thought to be born sometime between 1806 and 1807. Little is known about his early life. His father came to Osijek from Brünn in 1806 to be a teacher and later, director of the local art school. From 1827 to 1835, Hugo and his brother Otto were also teachers at a school in Ruma. In 1836, he went to study in Vienna, where he supported himself working for a landscaper. He remained there until 1840, when his father's illness forced him to return home. After his father's death, Hugo took over the management position at the art school in Osijek and remained there the rest of his life. Among his most prominent students were Izidor Kršnjavi and Adolf Waldinger.

In addition to the school, he maintained his own private art studio where he specialized in landscapes with peasants, soldiers and animals. In 1864, forty-two of his pencil drawings, depicting the ancient ruins and forests of Slavonia, were displayed at a major exhibition in Zagreb.

He died in 1869. A street in Osijek is named in his honor and is marked with a memorial bust.

== Gallery ==
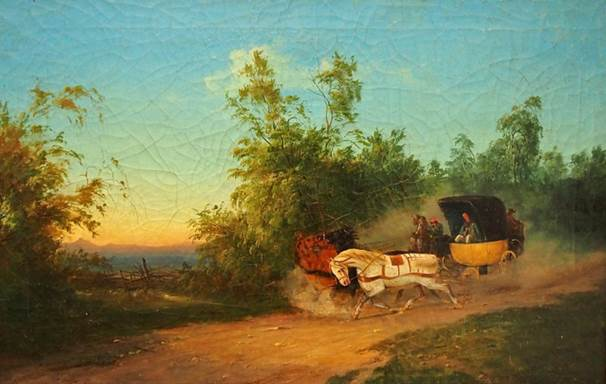
Pastorale III

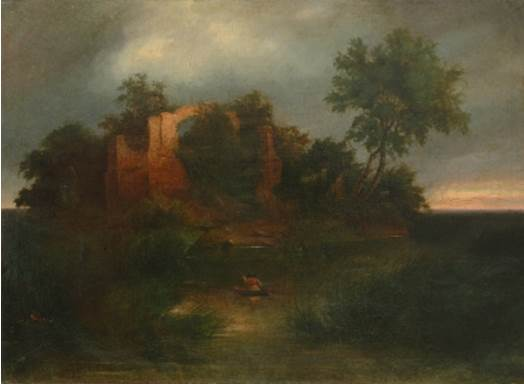
Ruins

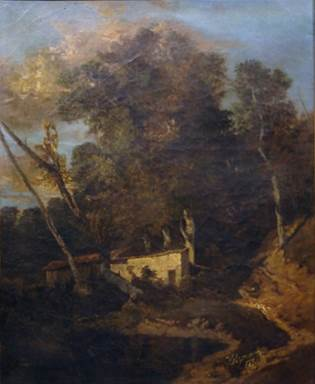
Landscape

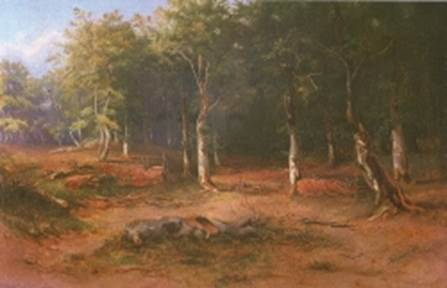
Slavonian forest
