= Waldinger Gallery =

- Galerija Waldinger
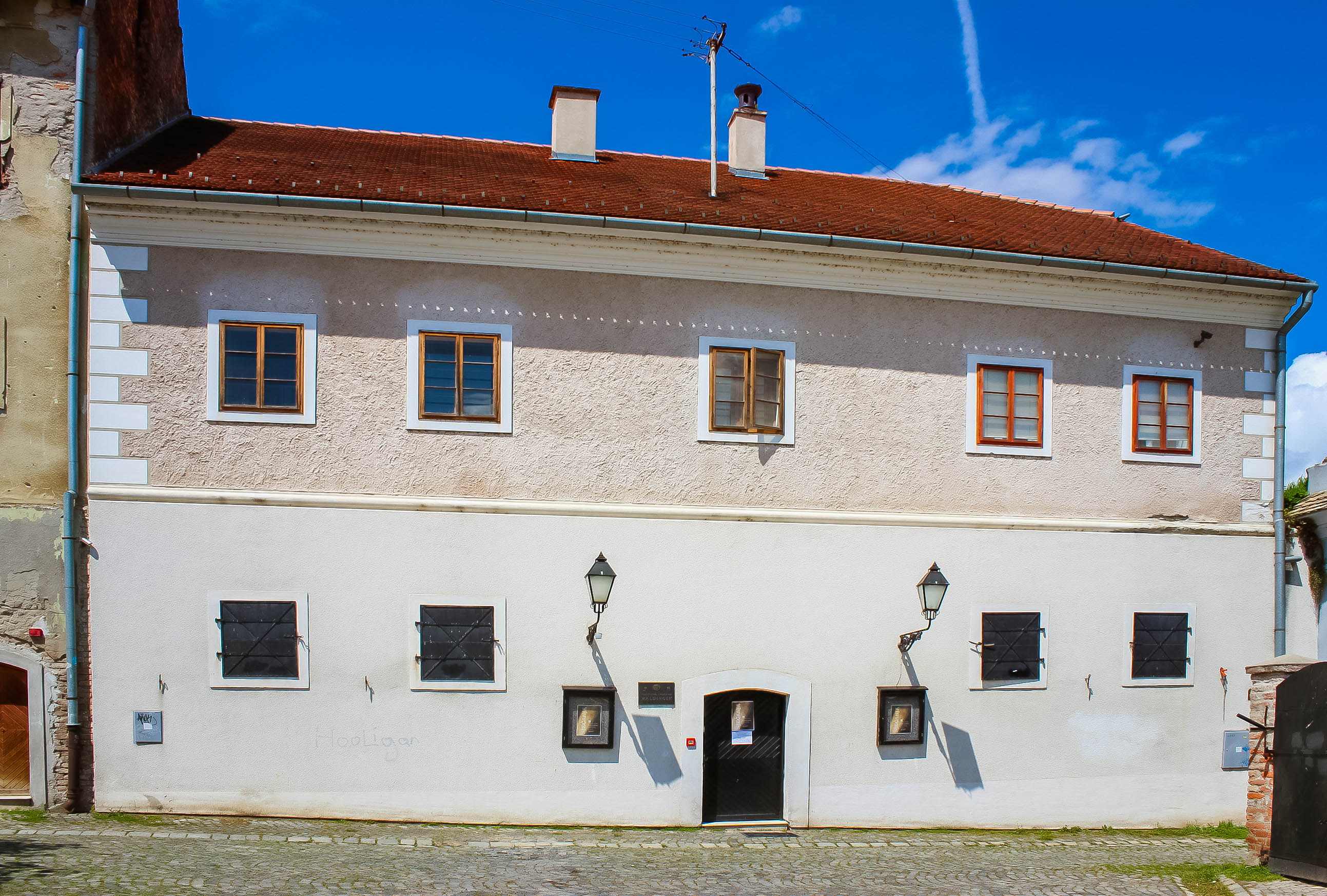
- Location: Osijek, Croatia
- Coordinates: 45.5613°N 18.6980°E
- Type: Gallery
- Website: ggo.hr/waldingerionica

The Waldinger Gallery (Croatian: Galerija Waldinger) is an art museum in Osijek, Croatia. It is located in Tvrđa. It is named after Adolf Waldinger, a Croatian painter from Osijek.

== See also ==
- List of museums in Croatia
