= The Punishment of Luxury =

The Punishment of Luxury may refer to:

- The Punishment of Luxury (album), a 2017 album by Orchestral Manoeuvres in the Dark
- The Punishment of Lust, also called The Punishment of Luxury, an 1891 painting by Giovanni Segantini
- Punishment of Luxury, English post-punk band
