= Segantini =

Segantini is a surname. Notable people with the surname include:

- Giovanni Segantini (1858–1899), Italian painter
- Luca Segantini, executive director of the International Society of Nephrology (2009–2018) and CEO of the European Society for Organ Transplantation (2019-2022)
