= The Punishment of Luxury (album) =

Studio album by Orchestral Manoeuvres in the Dark
- Released: 1 September 2017
- Studios: Bleepworks; Northern Electric
- Genre: Synth-pop
- Length: 42:08
- Labels: White Noise, 100%
- Producer: OMD

Orchestral Manoeuvres in the Dark chronology
English Electric (2013)	The Punishment of Luxury (2017)	Bauhaus Staircase (2023)

Singles from The Punishment of Luxury
- 1. "Isotype" Released: 29 May 2017; 2. "The Punishment of Luxury" Released: 19 July 2017; 3. "What Have We Done" Released: 29 August 2017; 4. "One More Time" Released: 16 February 2018

The Punishment of Luxury is the thirteenth studio album by the English electronic band Orchestral Manoeuvres in the Dark (OMD), and the third since their 2006 reformation. Produced by OMD, it was released on 1 September 2017 by 100% Records in the UK and White Noise elsewhere. In July of that year, the band commenced a tour of North America and Europe in support of the record.

The Punishment of Luxury explores themes of consumerism and First World problems. The album met with favourable reviews, and was named as one of the best and most underrated of 2017. It debuted at number four on the UK Albums Chart with 9,894 copies sold in its first week, making it the band's first album to reach the top 10 in their home country since 1991's Sugar Tax; the record topped the UK Independent Albums Chart. It reached the top 10 on various European charts, as well as on Billboard's Dance/Electronic Albums and Independent Albums charts in the United States.

== Background ==
Toward completion of the gruelling recording sessions for English Electric (2013), there were internal doubts about the band's future. Morale had risen after several months of touring the album, however. Keyboardist Paul Humphreys said in August 2013: "We're already talking about what we should be doing next. We've got a great idea for a new album actually." By the turn of 2015, writing of the album had "started in earnest", with song titles "The Punishment of Luxury" and "Evolution of Species" being announced (the latter did not make the album, instead appearing on 2023 follow-up Bauhaus Staircase).

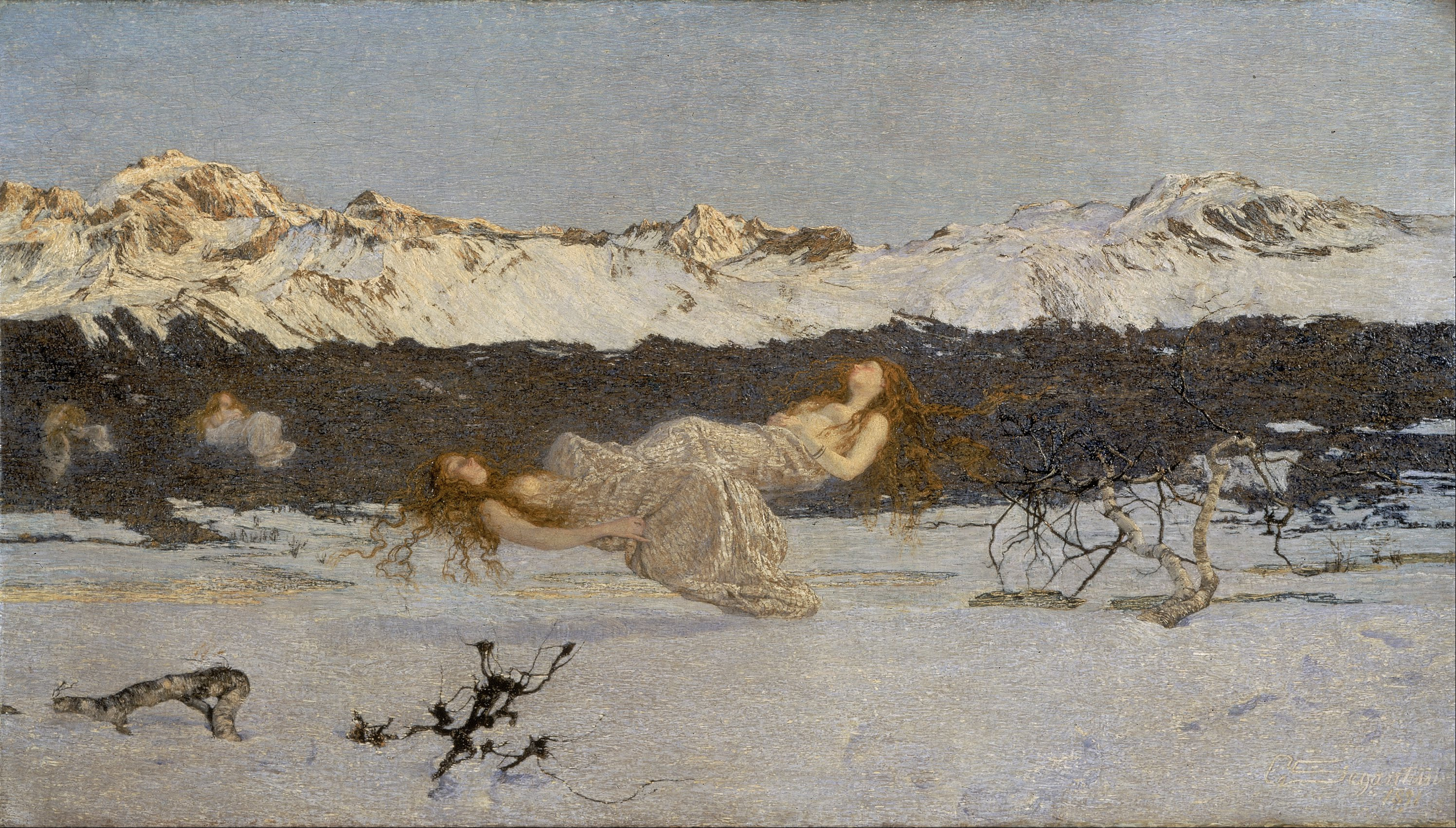
The album was influenced by Giovanni Segantini's The Punishment of Lust (1891), also known as The Punishment of Luxury.

The Punishment of Luxury takes its name from a 1891 painting by Italian artist Giovanni Segantini. In December 2016, OMD frontman Andy McCluskey expounded: "We've taken that idea and extrapolated it into sort of... a metaphor for modern life, really. First world problems. All of the shit we have to deal with is only a problem that's created for you by some suggestion that came from a marketing man or a PR job that's been done on you."

Humphreys said of the album's musical direction: "We're still trying to maintain our connection with our roots, but we've tried to go a bit more, even more stripped-down than English Electric." McCluskey added: "There's a little bit more sort of crunchy industrial sound in a few things, a bit glitchy-er. But you know, the bottom line is that we have a sense of melody that we just can't throw off." In May 2017, McCluskey noted the band's use of "noises and repetitive patterns".

"Robot Man", a song about emotional honesty, is an homage to English musician and producer Daniel Miller. It was inspired by Miller's 1978 composition, "Warm Leatherette".

The track "La Mitrailleuse" (French for "The Machinegun") was released on 15 May; its Henning M. Lederer-directed video is based on the 1915 painting by C. R. W. Nevinson after which the song is named. The album's first official single, "Isotype", premiered on 29 May and was made available for digital download and streaming the day after. McCluskey told The Guardian in 2025 that the song was inspired by the work and "genius" of philosopher Otto Neurath, specifically his International System of Typographic Picture Education.

The album's title track was released as the second single on 19 July. "The View from Here" was made available on 18 August, and "What Have We Done", the only track on the album sung by Humphreys, was released as the third single on 29 August, along with an extended version of the song; this release marked Humphreys' first lead vocal on an OMD single since 1986's "(Forever) Live and Die". A remixed version of "One More Time" by Fotonovela followed on 16 February 2018.

The album's cover art was designed by Liverpool-based artist John Petch.

== Reception ==
Professional ratings
Aggregate scores
Source	Rating
Metacritic	71/100
Review scores
Source	Rating
AllMusic	3.5/5 stars
The A.V. Club	B+
Classic Pop	4/5
God Is in the TV	9/10
Hampshire Chronicle	4.5/5 stars
The Irish Times	4/5 stars
L'Obs	3/4 stars
PopMatters	7/10 stars
The Press	4/5 stars
Uncut	7/10

The Punishment of Luxury received favourable reviews. At Metacritic, which assigns a normalised rating out of 100 to reviews from mainstream critics, the album garnered an average score of 71, based on 10 reviews. Tim Russell of God Is in the TV wrote, "OMD have made arguably the best album of 2017... It's brilliant. It's the first album since 1981's multi-million selling Architecture & Morality on which they've succeeded in perfectly balancing the creative tension between their experimental leanings and their ear for a pop tune to create a cohesive whole." Irish Times critic Jennifer Gannon described the record as "synth-pop at its most charming and effortless", while Tim Sendra of AllMusic called it "another strong showing from a band that could have packed it in years ago and become a nostalgia act, but have instead continued to make fine pop art".

Critic Aaron Badgley wrote, "The Punishment of Luxury is simply one of the best albums of the year and an album that will no doubt influence younger bands... once again, [OMD] breaks new ground. Quite an accomplishment." On the other hand, PopMatters' John Bergstrom observed a "less-than-fresh" anti-consumerism sentiment, which he felt made for a "good album rather than a great one". Bergstrom allowed, however, that much of the material is "on par with the band's best". The Hampshire Chronicle suggested that The Punishment of Luxury had been misinterpreted by some, writing, "This isn't some banal, [Bill] Hicks-esque "Get a soul!" nuke: it's a plaintive look at the brutal consumerist needle and the damage done. And a bloody terrific record to boot." Particular praise was directed at the six-minute "Ghost Star", which multiple reviewers singled out as the highlight of the album.

Journalists featured The Punishment of Luxury in lists of the best albums of 2017, while the Hampshire Chronicle and Salon considered it to be one of the year's most underrated records. God Is in the TV's Tim Russell later named it one of the 20 greatest albums of the 2010s; in a poll of 3,200 Modern Synthpop readers, it was voted the eighth-best synth-pop album of the decade. Critic John Earls argued that "you won't get a better late-period synth-pop classic album" than The Punishment of Luxury. Veteran DJ Richard Blade said, "I was stunned when I listened. The problem was not finding something to play but deciding which track to put on first. It was that good." The Athens Voice declared OMD, on the strength of The Punishment of Luxury, to be "one of the few names of their generation who can still create music that inspires".

Musician Craig "Space March" Simmons named The Punishment of Luxury the best synth-pop album of 2017. In 2020, singer Boy George streamed a cover version of "The View from Here" via his Instagram channel, adding that he wished he had written the song. Among the OMD fanbase, The Punishment of Luxury has come to be regarded as one of the band's great records.

== Track listing ==
All tracks are written by Paul Humphreys and Andy McCluskey. All tracks produced by OMD.

No.	Title	Length
1.	"The Punishment of Luxury"	3:28
2.	"Isotype"	6:10
3.	"Robot Man"	3:00
4.	"What Have We Done"	3:48
5.	"Precision & Decay"	1:44
6.	"As We Open, So We Close"	3:04
7.	"Art Eats Art"	3:20
8.	"Kiss, Kiss, Kiss, Bang, Bang, Bang"	3:00
9.	"One More Time"	3:06
10.	"La Mitrailleuse"	2:05
11.	"Ghost Star"	6:18
12.	"The View from Here"	3:05

== Personnel ==
Credits adapted from the liner notes of The Punishment of Luxury.

OMD

- OMD – engineering, production, recording
- Andy McCluskey – bass guitar, keyboards, vocals
- Paul Humphreys – keyboards, mixing, vocals
- Martin Cooper – keyboards
- Stuart Kershaw – drums

Additional personnel

- Effection – design
- Mike Marsh – mastering
- Chris Oaten – photography
- John Petch – front cover
- David Watson – backing vocals (on "What Have We Done")

== Charts ==
Chart (2017)	Peak position
Austrian Albums (Ö3 Austria)	28
Belgian Albums (Ultratop Flanders)	40
Belgian Albums (Ultratop Wallonia)	47
Czech Albums (ČNS IFPI)	60
Dutch Albums (Album Top 100)	95
French Albums (SNEP)	12
German Albums (Offizielle Top 100)	9
Irish Albums (IRMA)	28
Irish Independent Albums (IRMA)	3
Polish Albums (ZPAV)	40
Scottish Albums (Official Charts)	4
Swiss Albums (Schweizer Hitparade)	44
UK Albums (Official Charts)	4
UK Independent Albums (Official Charts)	1
US Independent Albums (Billboard)	3
US Top Dance Albums (Billboard)	7
