= Marino Tartaglia =

Croatian painter and art teacher (1894–1984)

- Born: 3 August 1894; Zagreb, Austria-Hungary (today's Croatia)
- Died: 21 April 1984 (aged 89); Zagreb, SFR Yugoslavia (today's Croatia)
- Known for: Oil painting
- Movement: Post-Impressionism, Expressionism, futurism

Marino Tartaglia (3 August 1894 – 21 April 1984) was a Croatian painter and art teacher, for many years a professor at the Academy of Fine Arts, Zagreb.

From 1948, he was a member of the Croatian Academy of Sciences and Arts. He received the Vladimir Nazor Award for lifetime achievement in the arts in 1964.

== Biography ==
Marino Tartaglia was born on 3 August 1894 in Zagreb. He completed elementary school and the Royal High School in Split. In 1907, he encountered Emanuel Vidović and became interested in painting. He studied drawing with Virgil Meneghello Dinčić. He enrolled in the Architectural School ( Građevna stručna škola) in Zagreb (1908–1912), where among his teachers were well-known painters: Oton Iveković, Ivan Tišov, Robert Frangeš Mihanović and Bela Čikoš Sesija. In the turbulent times before the First World War, fearing political persecution, he left for Italy, first to Florence, then to Rome, where in 1913 he enrolled in the Instituto Superiore di Belle Arti.

He spent a brief time as a volunteer on the Salonika front, but quickly returned to Rome where he worked an assistant to Ivan Meštrović, then returned to Florence where he got to know the Futurist artists Carlo Carrà, Giorgio de Chirico and others.

Following the war, he spent time in Split (1918–1921), then travelled to Vienna, Belgrade, and Paris. Returning to Zagreb in 1931, at the request of Vladimir Becić, Tartaglia started work as a trainee teacher at the Academy of Fine Arts, becoming a lecturer in 1940, associate professor in 1944, and full professor in 1947. He trained several generations of Croatian painters.

From 1948, he was a full member of the Croatian Academy of Sciences and Arts. In 1964, he received the Vladimir Nazor Award for Lifetime Achievement in the arts. In 1975, he held a retrospective exhibition at the Art Pavilion in Zagreb.

Marino Tartaglia died on 21 April 1984 in Zagreb.

== Legacy ==
In his early works, Tartaglia showed the influence of Cézanne and the post-Impressionists, while in his later works the flat colourful masses become almost completely abstract – verging on figurative. Tartaglia was especially impressive in his series of self-portraits, which showed signs of expressionism from 1917, and were completely abstract by the 1960s. His work was spontaneous, with a connection to primitive art, such as that of ancient cave paintings.

== Works ==
- Self-portrait, 1917 — Expressionist style painting
- Self-portrait, 1920
- Marjan Through the Olive (Marjan kroz masline) 1920
- Still Life with Statue II (Mrtva priroda s kipom II), 1921
- Combing (Češljanje), 1924
- Still Life with fruits and basket, 1926
- Small Breakwater (Mali lukobran), 1927
- Landscape (Pejsaž), 1928
- Portrait of Mrs Fink I (Portret gđe Fink I), 1935
- My Wife (Moja žena), 1936
- Painter (Slikar), 1966
- Flowers I (Cvijeće I), 1966

== Exhibitions ==
Throughout his sixty-year artistic career, Tartaglia held 30 solo exhibitions and over 270 group exhibitions at home and abroad. He participated in the Venice Biennale of 1940.

=== Solo shows ===
Selected recent solo exhibitions include

- 2009 Marino Tartaglia – Gallery Adris, Rovinj
- 2004 Marino Tartaglia : Retrospektivna izložba – Galerija Umjetnina Split, Split
- 2003 Galerija Klovićevi dvori, Zagreb
- 1975/6 Retrospective Exhibition at the Art Pavilion in Zagreb
- 1971 Marino Tartaglia – Gallery of Fine Arts, Split
- 1964 Marino Tartaglia – Gallery of Fine Arts, Split

=== Group shows ===
Selected recent group exhibitions include

- 2008 From the holdings of the museum – Museum of Modern Art Dubrovnik, Dubrovnik
- 2007 Iz fundusa galerije – Museum of Modern Art Dubrovnik, Dubrovnik
- 2006 Croatian Collection – Museum of Contemporary Art Skopje, Skopje

=== Public collections ===
His work can be found in the following public collections

Croatia

- Gallery of Fine Arts, Split (Galerija Umjetnina) Split
- Museum of Contemporary Art, Zagreb (Muzej Suvremene Umjetnosti)
- Museum of Modern Art Dubrovnik, Dubrovnik
- Muzej Moslavine, Kutina

Macedonia (F.Y.R.M.)

- Museum of Contemporary Art, Skopje

Serbia

- Museum of Contemporary Art, Belgrade

Slovenia

- Modern Gallery (Moderna Galerija), Ljubljana

== Bibliography ==
- Tonko Maroević: Monografija, Galerija Klovićevi dvori, Zagreb 2003., ISBN 953-6776-61-8
- Igor Zidić: Marino Tartaglia (1894–1984), Moderna galerija, 2009., ISBN 978-953-559-483-3
- Božo Bek, Mića Bašićević: Marino Tartaglia (katolog izložbe), Galerija suvremene umjetnosti Zagreb, 1967.
- Željka Čorak, Tonko Maroević: Marino Tartaglia (katolog izložbe), Umjetnički paviljon, Zagreb, 1975.
