= Love at the Fountain of Life =

Painting by Giovanni Segantini

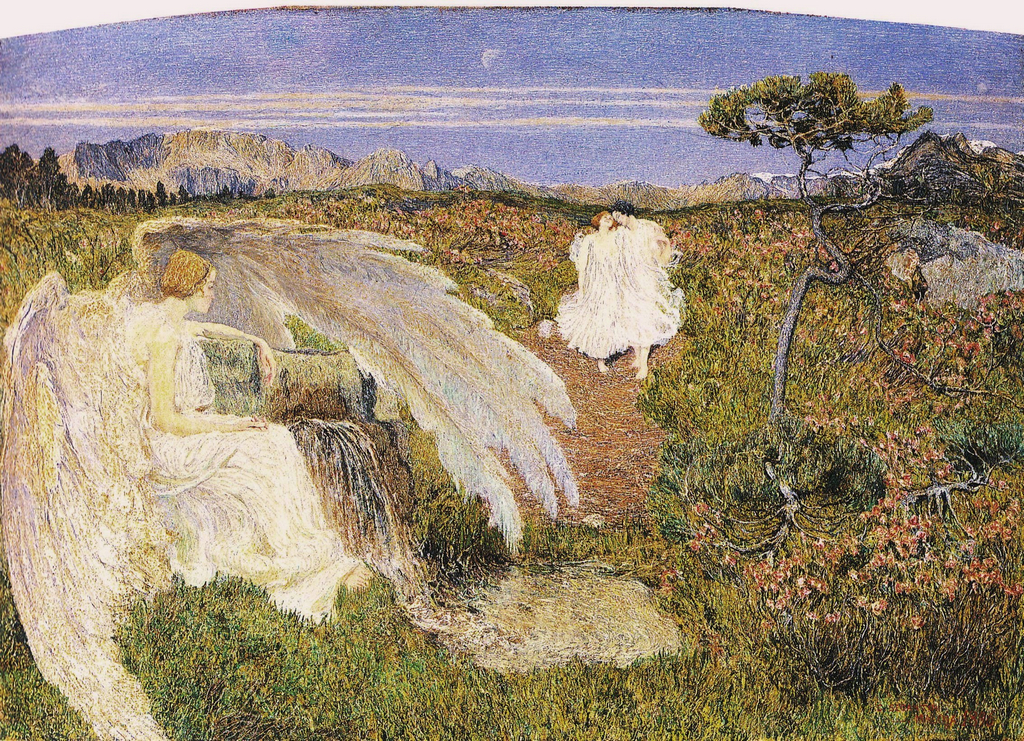
Love at the Fountain of Life (1896) by Giovanni Segantini

Love at the Fountain of Life or The Lovers at the Fountain of Life is an 1896 oil on canvas painting by Giovanni Segantini, commissioned by prince Yusupov of Saint Petersburg during the artist's mature period and one of the most famous works of his Symbolist period, which had begun in 1891 with The Bad Mothers. It is signed in red at bottom left "G. Segantini - Maloja 1896". It is now in the Galleria d'Arte Moderna, in Milan, to which it was bequeathed in 1955.
