= Emanuel Vidović =

Croatian painter (1870–1953)

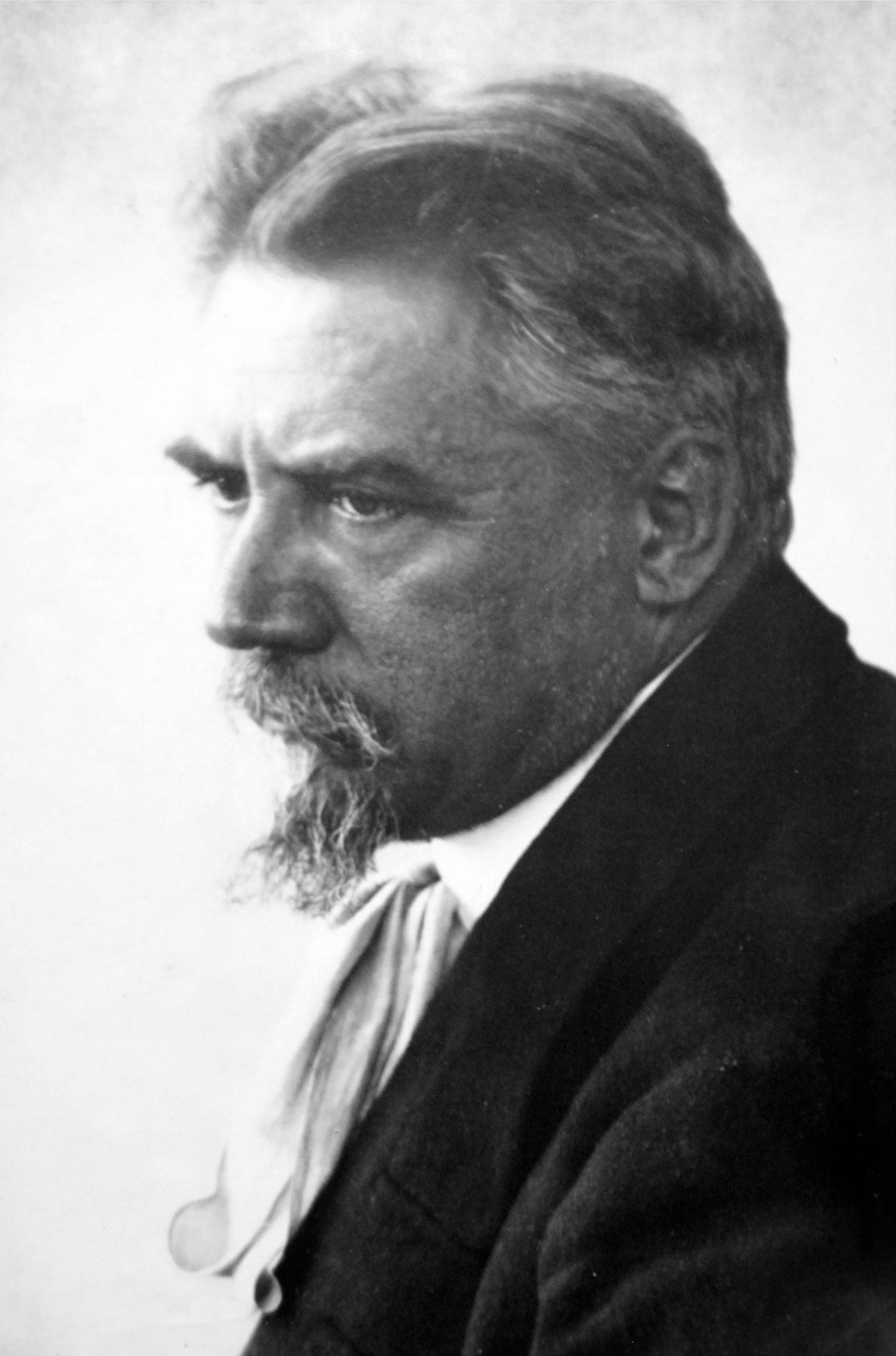
- Emanuel Vidović in 1936
- Born: 24 December 1870; Split, Dalmatia, Austria-Hungary (now Croatia)
- Died: 1 June 1953 (aged 82); Split, PR Croatia, Yugoslavia (now Croatia)
- Education: Venice
- Known for: Oil painting, Gouache, Graphic arts, Pastels
- Movement: Impressionism, Art Nouveau, Modern Art

Emanuel Božidar Vidović (24 December 1870 – 1 June 1953) was a Croatian painter and graphic artist from Split.

Emanuel Vidović was instrumental in bringing the modern art ideas to Split. From 1900 he was an active member of the Literary-Art Club, and in 1907, together with Ivan Meštrović, he founded the Medulić Society. Though he had trained at the Academy of Arts in Venice, he never completed his formal studies, preferring instead to paint scenes of Venice – interiors, views of canals, lagoons and motifs from around the town of Chioggia. In 1898, he returned to his home city of Split, bringing new ideas of Post-Impressionist style light and intense colour. He painted plein air landscapes, and more stylized, larger canvases back in his studio. His early work contained literary allusions to South Slavic history and legends, in an Art Nouveau style. Later work would become darker, with brighter accents, and expressionist style black outlines around forms. His landscapes, and especially his later interiors of churches around Split and Trogir were well received by critics and the public.

Vidović was elected a corresponding member of the Yugoslav Academy of Sciences and Arts in 1949. He exhibited his work at solo and group shows within Croatia and abroad. For many years he was Professor of Drawing at the High School, and at the School of Crafts in Split.

In 1986, the Emanuel Vidović Gallery was opened in Split, featuring the life and works of the artist.

== Biography ==
Vidović was the first child of Ivan Vidović from Split, and Paškva (née Grubić) from nearby Solin. He was born on Christmas Eve 1870 in a stone cottage in the Veli Varoš area of city. After elementary school, he attended the Imperial Royal High School (Cesarsko-kraljevsku Veliku Realku) in Split, where he studied drawing with the architect and painter Emil Vecchietti.

In 1887, the 17-year-old Vidović enrolled as a student of sculpture at the Accademia di Belle Arti in Venice. He transferred to the painting department, but was dissatisfied with the conservatism of the teaching, and in 1890 gave up his formal studies. He struggled for a time to support himself, painting scenes around Venice. In 1892 he arrived in Milan, where he worked at Famiglia Artistica.

In 1894, one of Vidović's paintings was exhibited in Milan along with works by Giovanni Segantini. That same year, he spent time in Chioggia, a quiet fishing town with picturesque lagoons and canals. Among the paintings of the time was a canvas bathed in light, painted in broad strokes, and some romantic dawn and dusk landscapes, which reflect the spirit of symbolism.

On his return to Split, Vidović developed a close relationship with painters Josip Lalić, Ante Katunarić and Virgil Meneghello Dinčić, and with the builder Ante Bezić. In 1896 he exhibited his work locally, and the following year at an international exhibition in Copenhagen.

In 1897 he spent almost a year in Chioggia, this time in the company of Ante Katunarić. From this productive time come views of Chioggia, Venice and Giudecca, where sunlit forms are portrayed in shimmering strokes of colour, and details are all but lost. Back in Split in 1898, Vidović painted local scenes in the same style. He became alternate drawing master at the high school, and set up his first studio. That year, also, he married Amalija Baffo from Chioggia.

Establishment of the Literary-Art Club (Književno-umjetničkog kluba) in 1900 brought modern art to Split. Emanuel Vidović was one of its most active members, organizing its first exhibition together with Josip Lalić in 1901. In addition to his oil paintings he also showed a few caricatures. In 1903, Vidović held his first solo exhibitions in Split and Zagreb, and appeared in group exhibitions in Milan, London, Vienna and Sofia.

In 1908 Vidović was one of the organizers of the big Dalmatian art exhibition, and in the same year along with Katunarić and Dincić began to publish a satirical paper Duje Balavac. Ivan Meštrović and Vidović founded the Medulić Society, along with other young artists of the area. In 1909 Vidović was appointed professor of drawing at the School of Crafts (Obrtnoj školi) in Split.

After the war, in 1919, Vidović held his second solo exhibit in Split, which later transferred to Zagreb, Belgrade, and Osijek. Then he moved into the studio which he used for 1919–1942 in the attic of the former government building on Klaićev Square.

In 1923 he held a solo exhibit in Prague, and in 1924 a joint exhibit with Anđelo Uvodić opened at the salon of Ivan Galić in Split. Emanuel Vidović organized the Great Jubilee Exhibition in 1929 in Split and Zagreb, and 1931 in Belgrade. At this time his oil paintings began to show new themes – still lifes and interiors, and he also exhibited landscapes in pastels.

During the early 1930s, Vidović created a significant cycle of Trogir landscapes which were exhibited in Split in 1936. These new works represented a departure from his earlier literary symbolism and were warmly received both by the public and by critics. In 1939, Vidović took part in the festival, "Half a century Croatian art" (Pola vijeka hrvatske umjetnosti) in Zagreb, and also held a new solo exhibit at Salon Galić in Split. They showed interiors of churches and his studio, and still lifes.

During 1938–1942 he painted a series of church interiors, developing a new approach to depicting space. Deep three-dimensional spaces taken from many different viewpoints are balanced by a refined treatment. The Trogir cycle of 1936 was welcomed by critics, and he was elected to participate in the Venice Biennales of 1942 and 1952. During the war he retired to his studio and focused on painting interiors and still lifes.

In 1949 Vidovic was elected a corresponding member of the Yugoslav Academy of Sciences and Arts and in 1952 a retrospective exhibition of his work was held in Zagreb.

Emanuel Vidovic died on 1 June 1953.

== Legacy ==
Vidović's early paintings of Venice, Milan and Chioggia, were inspired Segantini's divisionism technique. His paintings of Chioggia, in particular, range from soft lyrical twilight atmospheres to bright, colourful sunlit landscape and seascapes.

In Split and the surrounding area Vidović made many studies and sketches in plein-air, working with bright colours in the live landscape. Later in his studio, in transferring these fresh impressions to large canvases, Vidović would create a soft, lyrical and often symbolic atmosphere. His palette was getting darker, and many of these paintings demonstrate a strength and originality. On the brighter sections within otherwise dark paintings Vidović created intensive luminous and colourful effects.

In the diptych Small World (Mali svijet) Vidović experimented with Segantini divisions achieving a work of pure style. In Angelus (1906/7) space disappears, and the entire image is created with red planes of shimmering dots, and forms are reduced to a few peaceful horizontal lines.

Around 1920, Vidović's painting style changed – his palette became dark (mostly blue, green, brown and black) with the occasional accent of bright colour, forms outlined in black with lines that tended to become distorted, giving the paintings an expressionist feeling.

From 1930 Vidović paid regular visits to Trogir, attracted by the patina that long years gave to its architecture. At that time he also started painting still life, mainly inspired by ancient sculptures, church objects and antiques in his Split studio. He moved away from the earlier literary symbolism, his palette became brighter, drawings clearer while his artistic experience was reflected in lyrical notes and a typical Mediterranean atmosphere.

As a professor at the High School and at the School of Decorative Arts in Split, Vidović taught the younger generation of artists.

In 1986, the Emanuel Vidović Gallery was opened in Split, featuring the life and works of the artist. Part of the City Museum in Split, it contains a collection of paintings, photographs, and the artists's studio.

== Works ==
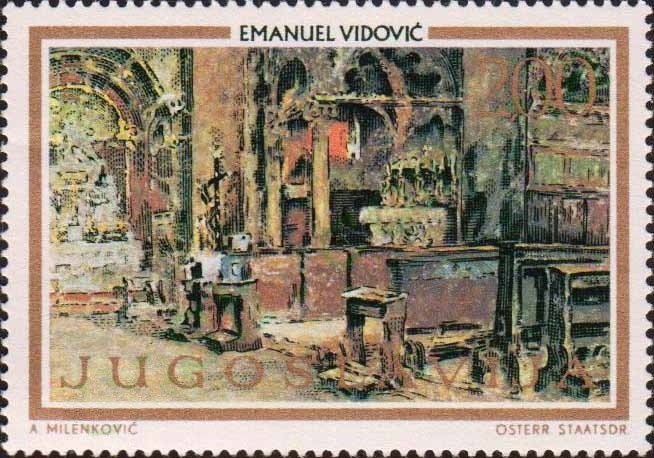
Interior by Vidović on a 1973 Yugoslav stamp

- Giudecca, 1898, Modern Gallery, Zagreb
- Vranjica, 1898, Archaeological Museum, Split
- Fall of Solin (Pada Solinčice) 1898
- Houses at Tusculum (Kuće kod Tusculuma) 1898
- Small World (Mali svijet), 1904
- Angelus, 1906/7, ulje na platnu, Modern Gallery, Zagreb
- Villager Houses, Solin (Seljačke kuće, Solin), 1921, Gallery Emanuel Vidovic, Split
- Still Life (Mrtva priroda) 1926
- From the Studio (Iz ateliera) 1926
- Statue with Vessel (Kip s posudom) 1927
- Split Harbour, 1937
- Split Cathedral (Splitska katedrala), 1939, Gallery Emanuel Vidovic, Split
- Old Clock (Stari sat), 1945, Gallery Emanuel Vidovic, Split
- Kamerlengo, 1952

Online gallery of his works

== Exhibitions ==
=== Solo exhibitions ===
Selected recent solo exhibitions

- 2009 Emanuel Vidovic exhibition at the Art pavilion "Juraj Sporer" in Opatija, Croatia
- 2001 Emanuel Vidović – Museum of Modern Art, Dubrovnik
- 2000 Emanuel Vidović : djela iz fundusa Galerije umjetnina – Galerija Umjetnina Split, Split
- 1982 Emanuel Vidović – Galerija Umjetnina Split, Split
- 1971 Emanuel Vidović 1870–1953 – Umjetnicki paviljon / Art Pavilion Zagreb, Zagreb
- 1963 Emanuel Vidović – Galerija Umjetnina Split, Split
- 1953 Posmrtna izložba Emanuela Vidovića – Galerija Umjetnina Split, Split

=== Group exhibitions ===
Selected recent group exhibitions

- 2008 From the holdings of the museum – Museum of Modern Art Dubrovnik, Dubrovnik
- 2007 Iz fundusa galerije – Museum of Modern Art Dubrovnik, Dubrovnik
- 2006 Selection from the Museum of Modern Art Dubrovnik Collection – Museum of Modern Art Dubrovnik, Dubrovnik
- Venice Biennale 1942, 1952

=== Public collections ===
- Modern Gallery, Zagreb
- Museum of Modern Art Dubrovnik, Dubrovnik
- Lošinjski muzej, Mali Lošinj
- Museum of Modern and Contemporary Art Rijeka, Rijeka
- Rovinj Heritage Museum, Rovinj
- Gallery of Fine Arts, Split
- Galerija Emanuela Vidovića, Split
