= Self-portrait (Tartaglia) =

1917 painting by Marino Tartaglia

- Autoportret (Croatian), Автопортрет (Bulgarian)
- Artist: Marino Tartaglia
- Year: 1917
- Type: oil on cardboard
- Dimensions: 35.5 cm × 19 cm (14.0 in × 7.5 in)
- Location: Museum of Contemporary Art, Zagreb; Zagreb

Self-portrait (Croatian: Autoportret) is one of the earliest works of Croatian artist Marino Tartaglia. He painted it in 1917, in the expressionist style.

== Description ==
The painting is part of his first period in painting and measures 35.5 × 19 cm. It is held in the collections of the Museum of Contemporary Art, Zagreb.
