= Virgil Meneghello Dinčić =

Croatian painter and art teacher

Virgil Meneghello Dinčić (1876–1944) was a Croatian painter and art teacher. He is best known as a member of the school of Split caricaturists, but also painted scenes of Croatian life.

== Life ==
Dinčić was born on 19 March 1876 in Split. He was an active member of the Split literary and artistic club, together with Emanuel Vidović, Josip Lalić, and Ante Katunarić. With Katunarić, he contributed to Duje Balavac, a popular magazine known for its social and political satire. His pupils included painter Marino Tartaglia.

Dinčić exhibited his works as part of Kingdom of Serbia's pavilion at International Exhibition of Art of 1911.

== Gallery ==
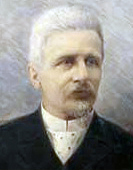
Portrait of Gajo Bulat

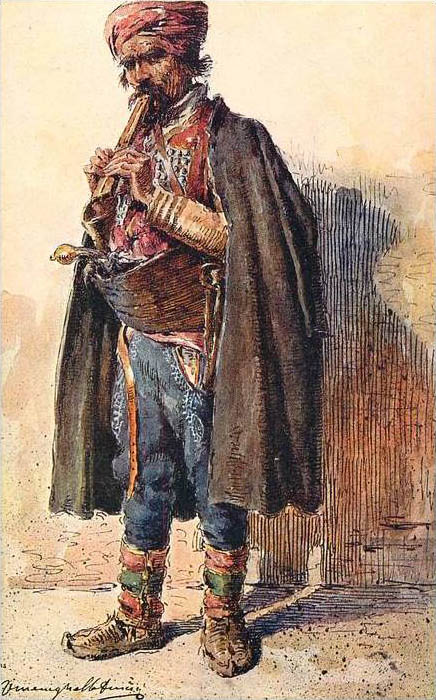
Dalmatian highlander
