= The Punishment of Lust =

Painting by Giovanni Segantini

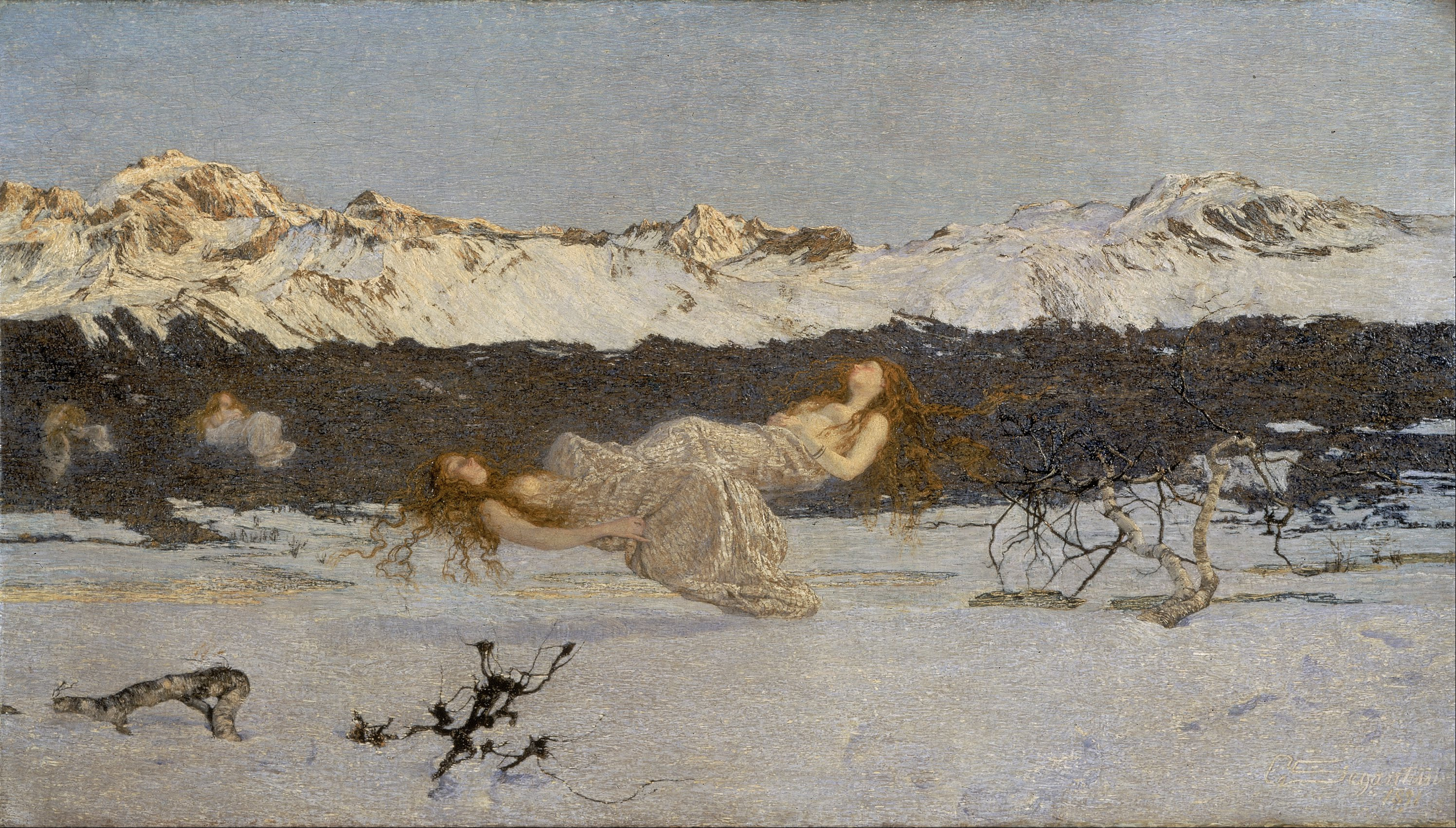
- Artist: Giovanni Segantini
- Year: 1891
- Dimensions: 99 cm (39 in) × 172.8 cm (68.0 in)

The Punishment of Lust (Italian: Il Castigo delle Lussuriose), also called The Punishment of Luxury, is an 1891 oil painting on canvas by the artist Giovanni Segantini.

== Background ==
Giovanni Segantini was born in the County of Tyrol in the Austro-Hungarian Empire, but his parents died when he was still young and he went to live with his step-sister Irene in Milan. Hoping that she and Giovanni could become Italian citizens, Irene revoked their Austrian citizenship, but for some reason failed to apply for Italian citizenship, leaving the pair stateless. Giovanni soon ran away and after a time living on the streets was sent to a reformatory, where he was encouraged to take up art.

During 1873, his half-brother Napoleon took him in and put him to work in his photographic studio. He worked as a decorative artist and studied at Accademia di Belle Arti di Brera in Milan and had some success as a painter, but eventually grew tired of the strictures of the academy and relocated with his family to Brianza in the foothills of the Alps where he adopted a more naturalistic approach, capturing the landscapes and daily lives of the workers.

A visit from the art dealer and critic Vittore Grubicy, who had discovered and promoted Segantini, around the end of 1886 or beginning of 1887 with news of the latest developments in painting sparked Segantini's interest in Symbolism and Divisionism; from that point on he began to produce more allegorical studies, often set in the bleak, snowy, clearly lit landscapes of the Alps.

== Painting ==
Segantini painted The Punishment of Lust in 1891; it was an early entry in a thematic series on cattive madri (bad mothers) that he produced between 1891 and 1896 (the Nirvana cycle), also featuring The Bad Mothers. Taking its inspiration from Nirvana published in 1889 – supposedly a translation from the 12th-century Indian Panghiavahli of Maironpada by the librettist Luigi Illica but probably written by him or translated from an intermediate work – it shows women being punished for preferring a life of ease over a life of duty by being suspended among the barren landscape of the Alps.

Segantini had been raised a Catholic and believed strongly that the role of a woman was to be a mother; the Nirvana cycle illustrates the outcome for women who failed in that role and contrasts with Segantini's Angel cycle, produced over the same period, that depicts the reward derived from being a good mother. Segantini's longing for the mother who had died when he was a child coupled with his resentment at losing her may be reflected in this dichotomous approach to the theme of motherhood.

The women in The Punishment of Lust are suggested to have aborted or lost their children, and although this would have been a sin in Segantini's eyes, he has still treated them sympathetically and, as the poem Nirvana does, hints that they could be redeemed; they are suspended in a dream-like state and, though stark, the landscape is not unpleasant – Segantini regarded the mountains as his spiritual home – and the inclusion of withered trees symbolises a possible return to life in a new spring.

== History ==
The painting was purchased by the Walker Art Gallery in Liverpool in 1893, but before it was exhibited it was retitled The Punishment of Luxury (Luxury being an archaic translation of the Italian lussuria) as the mention of "Lust" was thought to be too challenging for a Victorian public.

The British band Orchestral Manoeuvres in the Dark named their 13th studio album The Punishment of Luxury as a play on the title of Segantini's canvas.
