= Space March =

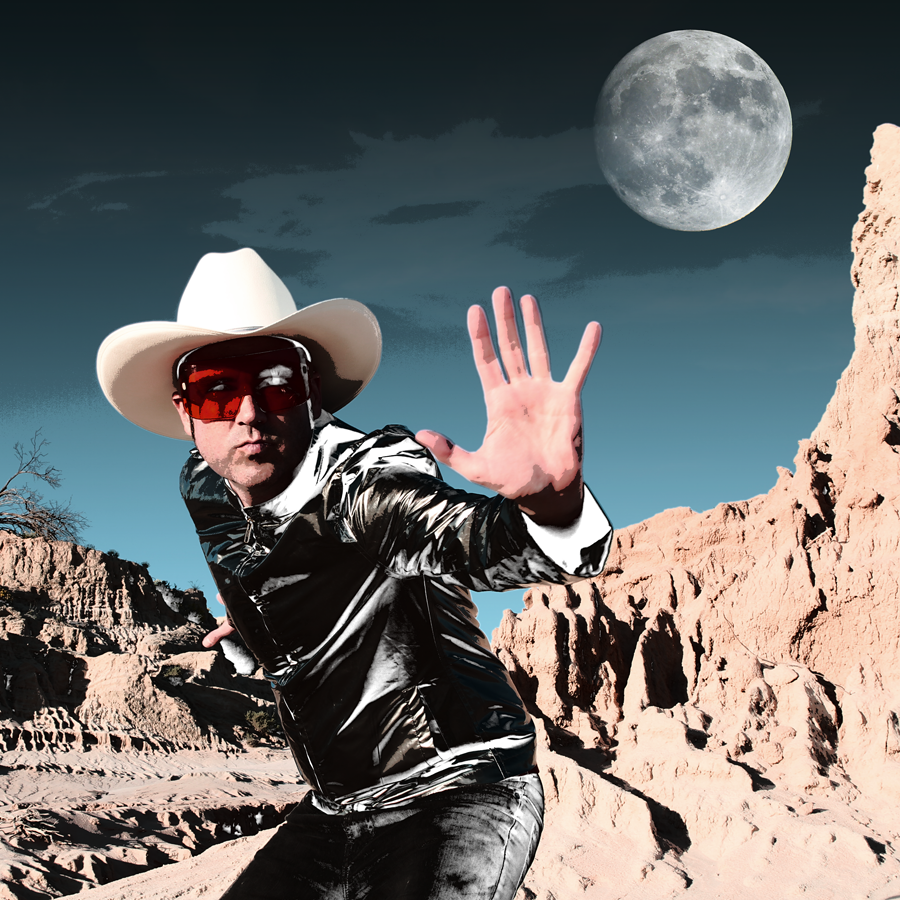

Background information
- Born: Craig Simmons
- Origin: Sydney, New South Wales, Australia
- Genres: Synth-pop; indie pop
- Years active: 2002–present
- Labels: Ninthwave Records, Hark Records
- Members: Craig Simmons
- Website: www.spacemarch.com

Space March is the project of Australian singer, songwriter, producer and artist Craig Simmons. Their music is described as melodic, layered, dreamy synth-pop.

== Music career ==
The debut self-titled Space March album was released in Australia in 2003 and picked up by synthpop label, Ninthwave Records as a US import release in 2004. Space March appeared in the Chicago Reader's 2004 year-end newspaper feature – The Best Music of 2004 with Music Critic, Ann Sterzinger, ranking the release number one in her top ten albums for that year. Sterzinger's top vote was similarly cast in The Village Voice Pazz & Jop poll for 2004. The debut Space March album was quite organic sounding for a synthpop album, combining Beatlesque Britpop and psychedelic electronics, with the Chicago Reader describing the album as mixing "The Magnetic Fields, Erasure, and a dollop of Momus".

Ninthwave Records digitally released the follow-up Space March album Without This You Can Never Change in 2006. The following year, the labels Ninthwave Records and Death By Karaoke released a remixed and repackaged version of the album both digitally and on CD. Without This You Can Never Change was more electro orientated than the debut but still retained a melodic, pop sensibility.

The third Space March album, Monumental, was released in September 2011. For this album, Simmons collaborated with multi-platinum record producer/mixer Mark Saunders whose production credits include: Erasure Wild!; The Cure Wish; Tricky Maxinquaye; A-ha The Foot of the Mountain. Monumental exhibited strong references to early 80s synthpop production which was noted in some reviews favourably.

Hark Records released the fourth Space March album, Mountain King, in February 2013. The title track incorporates the melodic theme from "In The Hall of the Mountain King" by Norwegian composer Edvard Grieg, written for the play, Peer Gynt in 1874–76.

In May 2014, Space March released an album of covers – It Must Be Obvious through Hark Records. The album features covers of songs by Pet Shop Boys, Muse, The Beatles, New Order, Duran Duran, The Cure, The White Stripes, Orchestral Manoeuvres in the Dark, The Velvet Underground, David Bowie, Depeche Mode and John Barry.

Space March released the sixth studio album in June 2018, titled – Future Memories. The ten track album is a mix of synthpop, electropop and synthwave.

The seventh studio album, Algorithm was released on 24 September 2021. This synthpop album consists of six unreleased tracks and four new mixes/versions of recent singles.

Prior to Space March, Simmons was the founding member of the synthpop duo, ElectroSquad which released two albums: Espionage (2000) and Operation: k (2001) on Hark Records.

== Art and design career ==
Simmons co-created the bandit.fm online music store for Sony Music, which was launched in Australia in 2008 and in several other countries over the following years.

Early in his design career, Simmons contributed graphic design and illustration to Midnight Oil's internationally released Earth and Sun and Moon Album.

In September 2011, Space March exhibited a series of large canvas artworks for each song on the Monumental album at blank_space Gallery in Sydney. Space March Art mixes modernism, geometry, graphics and pop art.

== Discography ==
=== Studio albums ===
- Space March (2003 Australia / 2004 US)
- Without This You Can Never Change (2006 – version 1)
- Without This You Can Never Change (2007 – version 2)
- Monumental (2011)
- Mountain King (2013)
- It Must Be Obvious (2014)
- Future Memories (2018)
- Algorithm (2021)
- Zeroes and Ones (2024)
