= The Bad Mothers =

Painting by Giovanni Segantini

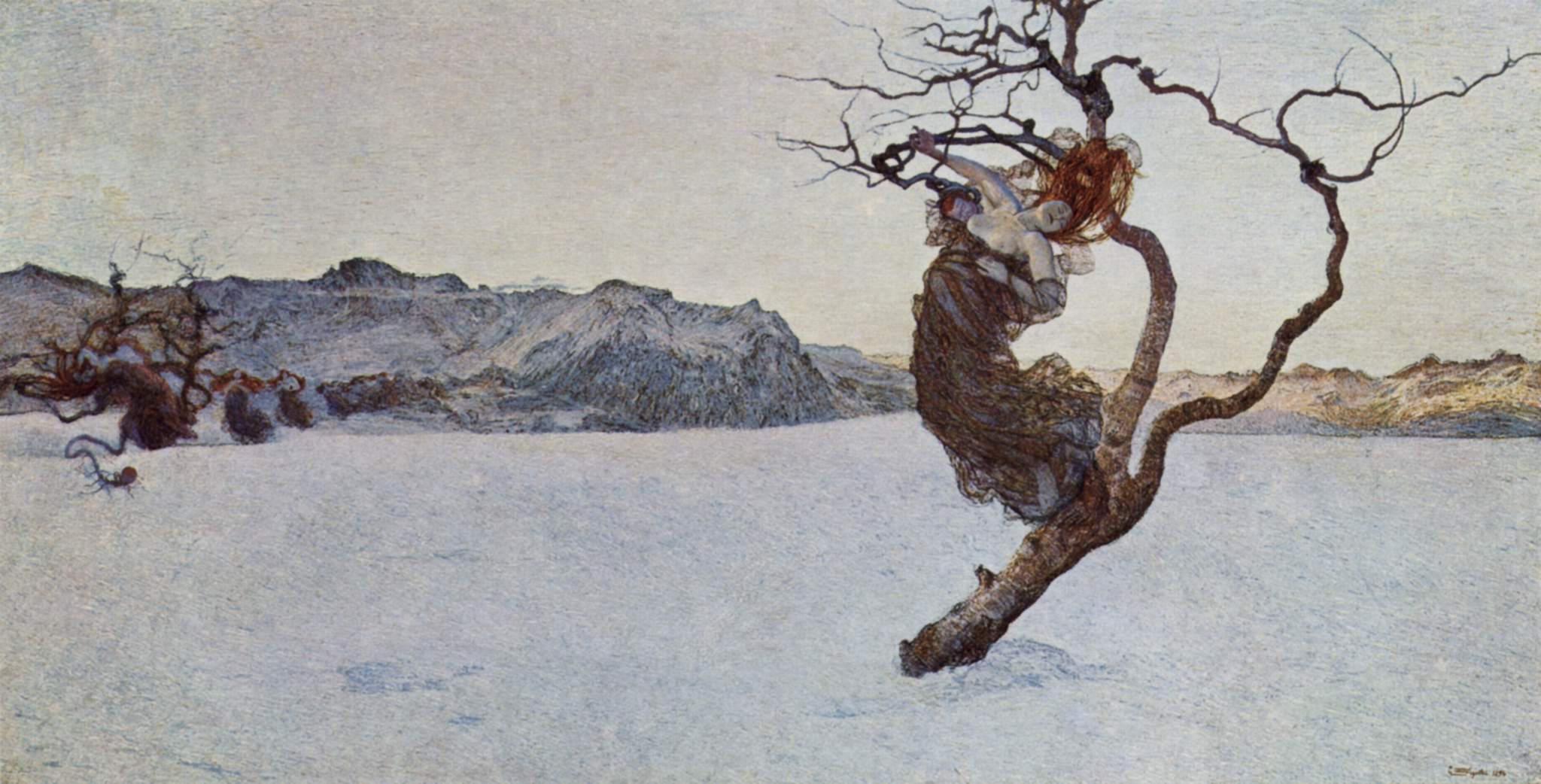
The Bad Mothers (1894)

The Bad Mothers or The Evil Mothers (Italian: Le cattive madri) is an oil on canvas painting by Giovanni Segantini, created in 1894, now in the Österreichische Galerie Belvedere, in Vienna. It is the last of four works in which he keeps returning to the motif of women in trees. The other three were The Fruit of Life (1889), The Punishment of Lust (1891) and The Angel of Life (1894), and together, they were his first Symbolist works.

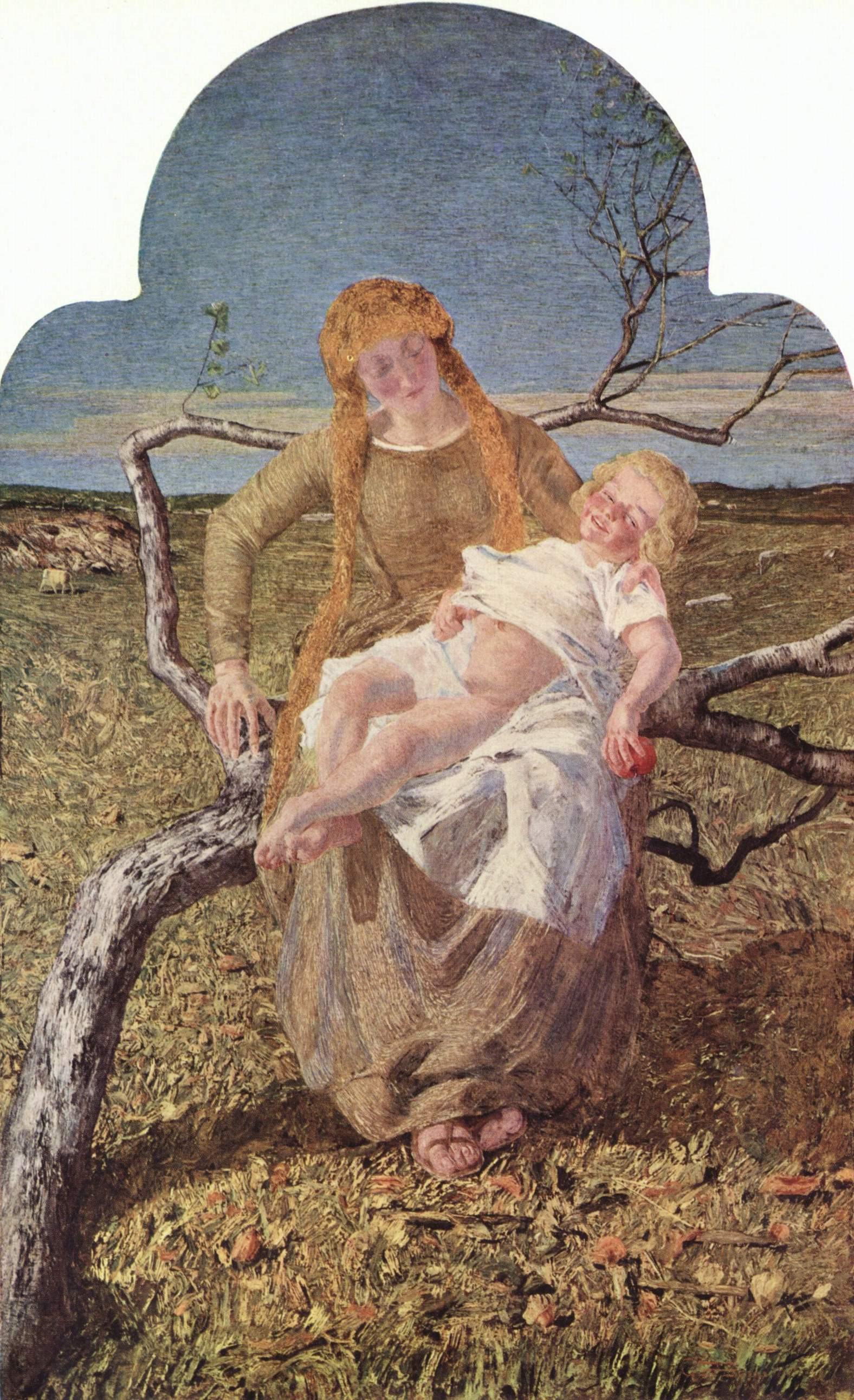
The Fruit of Life (1889)

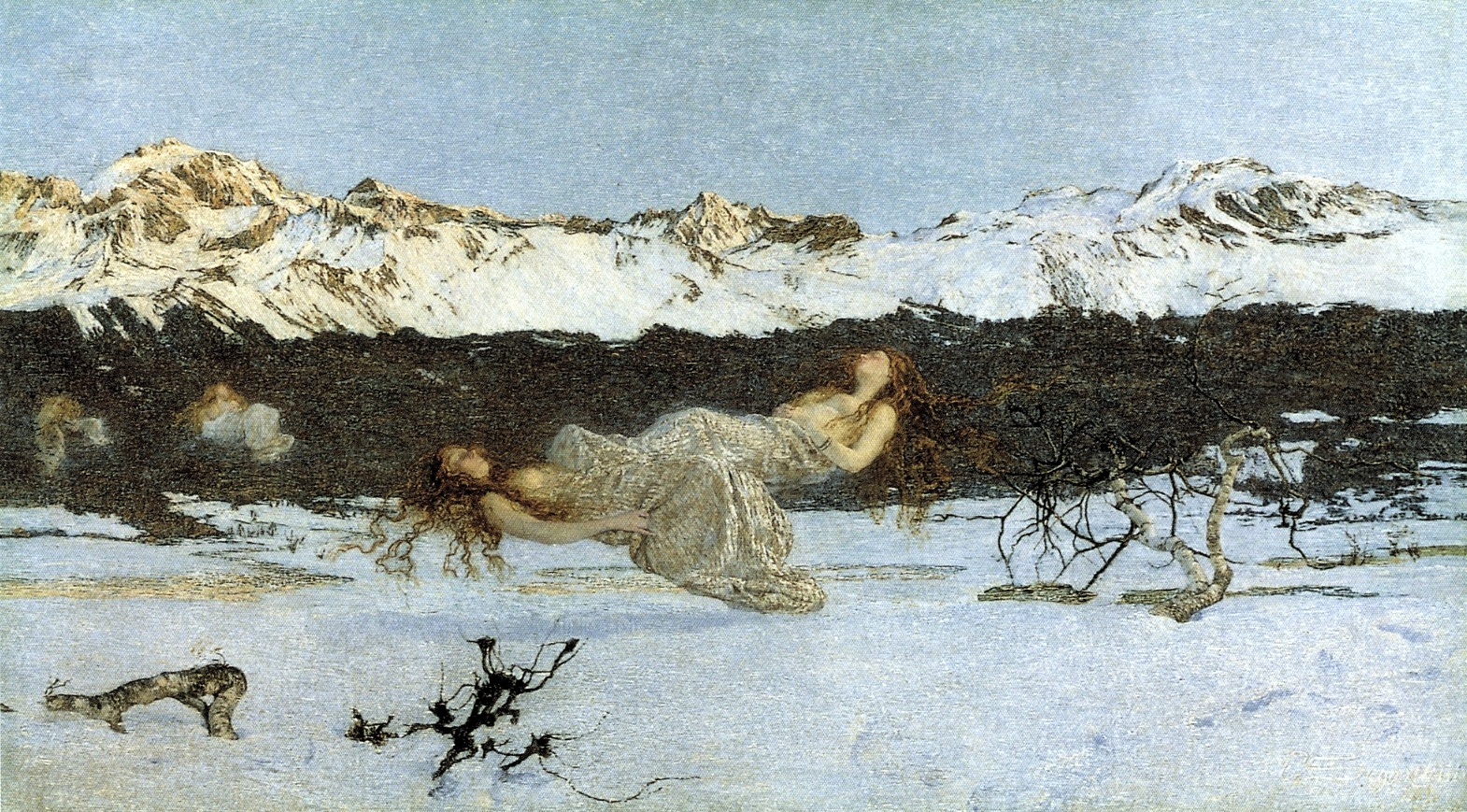
The Punishment of Lust (1891)

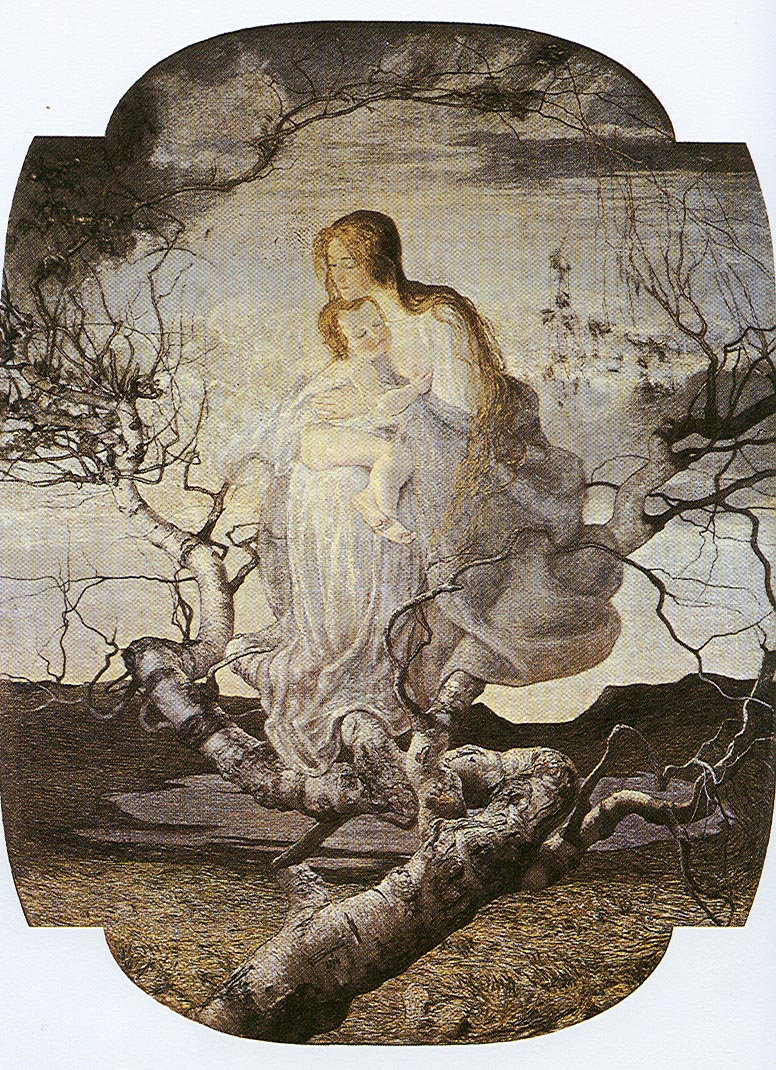
The Angel of Life (1894)
