= Giovanni Segantini =

Italian painter (1858–1899)

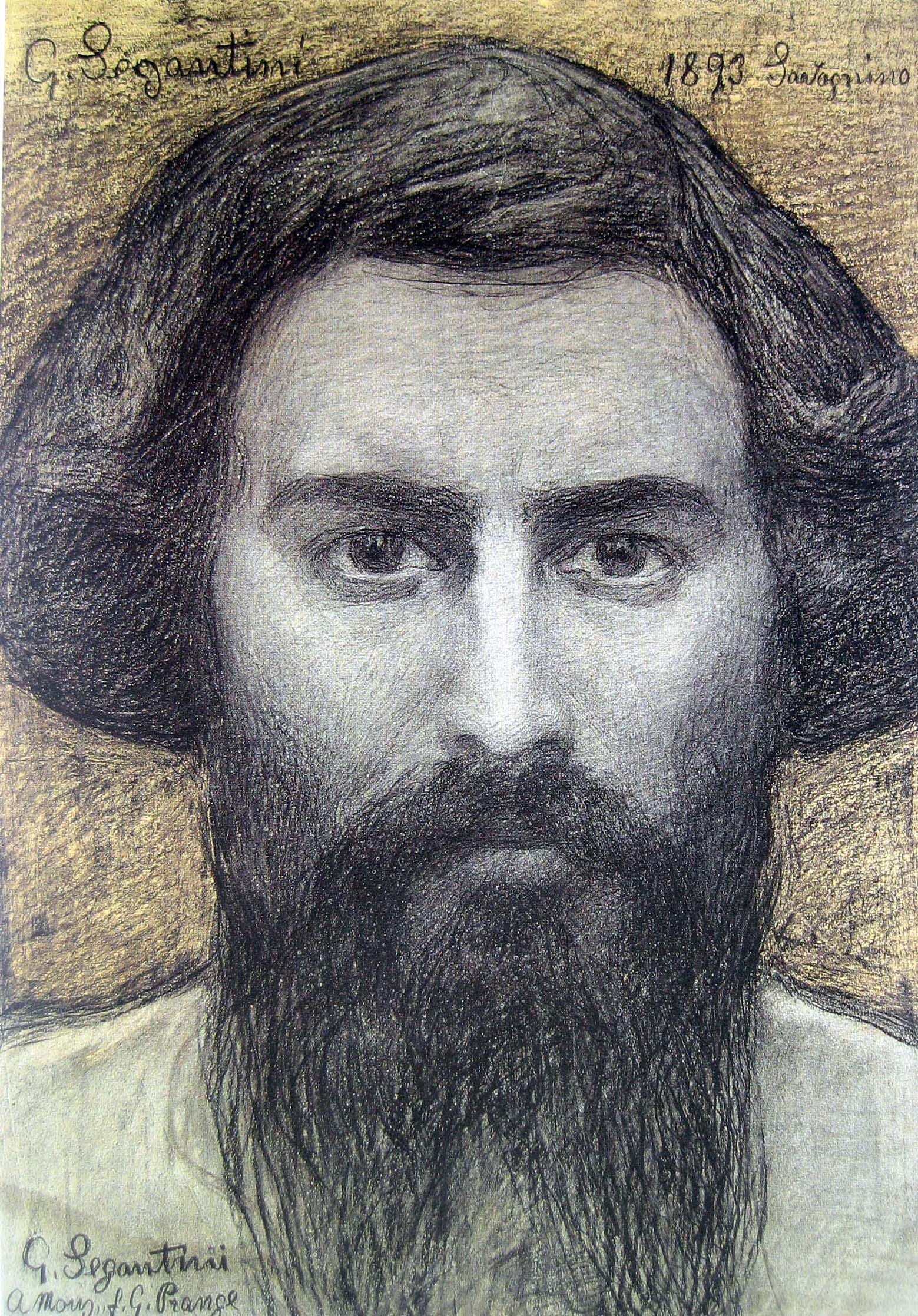
- Self-portrait, 1893
- Born: Giovanni Battista Emanuele Maria Segatini; 15 January 1858; Arco, Tyrol, Austrian Empire
- Died: 28 September 1899 (aged 41); Pontresina, Graubünden, Switzerland
- Education: Accademia di Brera
- Notable work: Alpine Triptych
- Relatives: Ettore Bugatti (nephew); Rembrandt Bugatti (nephew); Carlo Bugatti (brother-in-law)
- Patrons: Vittore Grubicy de Dragon

Giovanni Giovanni Battista Emanuele Maria Segantini (born Segatini; 15 January 1858 – 28 September 1899) was an Austrian-born stateless painter known for his large pastoral landscapes of the Alps. He was one of the most famous artists in Europe in the late 19th century, and his paintings were collected by major museums. In later life, he combined a Divisionist painting style with Symbolist images of nature. He was active first in Italy then in Switzerland during the last period of his life.

== Biography ==
Giovanni Battista Emanuele Maria Segatini was born in Arco in Trentino, which was then part of the County of Tyrol in the Austrian Empire. He later changed his family name by adding an "n" after the "a". He was the second child of Agostino Segatini (1802–1866) and Margarita De Girardi (1828–1865). His older brother, Lodovico, died in a fire the year Giovanni was born. During the first seven years of his life, his father, who was a tradesman, travelled extensively while looking for work. Except for a six-month period in 1864 when Agostino returned to Trentino, Segantini spent his early years with his mother, who experienced severe depression due to the death of Lodovico. These years were marked by poverty, hunger and limited education due to his mother's inability to cope.

In the spring of 1865, his mother died after spending the past seven years in increasingly poor health. His father left Giovanni under the care of Irene, his second child from a previous marriage, and again travelled in search of work. He died a year later without returning home and leaving his family nothing. Without money from her father, Irene lived in extreme poverty. She was forced to spend most of her time working menial jobs while leaving Giovanni to maintain on his own.

Irene hoped to better her life by moving to Milan, and in late 1865 she submitted an application to relinquish Austrian citizenship for both her brother and herself. She either misunderstood the process or simply did not have enough time to follow through, and although their Austrian citizenship was revoked, she neglected to apply for Italian citizenship. As a result, both Segantini and his sister remained stateless for the rest of their lives. After he became famous, Switzerland offered him citizenship on more than one occasion, but he refused in spite of many hardships, saying Italy was his true homeland. After his death, the Swiss government successfully awarded him citizenship.

At age seven, Segantini ran away and was later found living on the streets of Milan. The police committed him to the Marchiondi Reformatory, where he learned basic cobbling skills but little else. For much of his early life, he could barely read or write; he finally learned both skills when he was in his mid-30s. Fortunately, a chaplain at the reformatory noticed that he could draw quite well, and he encouraged this talent in an attempt to lift his self-esteem.

In 1873, Segantini's half-brother Napoleon claimed him from the reformatory, and for the next year Segantini lived with Napoleon in Trentino. Napoleon ran a photography studio, and Segantini learned the basics of this relatively new art form while working there with his half-brother. He would later use photography to record scenes that he incorporated into his painting.

== Career ==
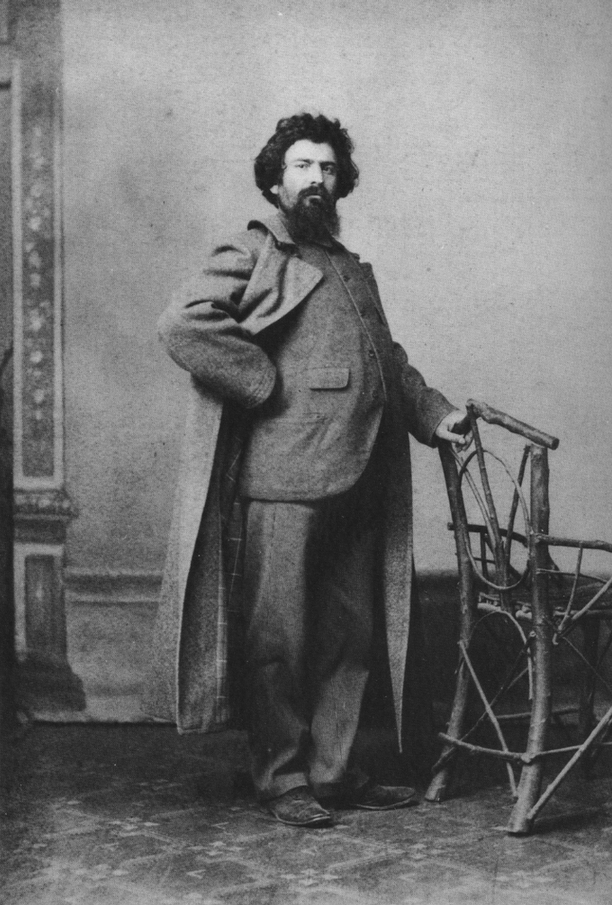
Segantini in 1890

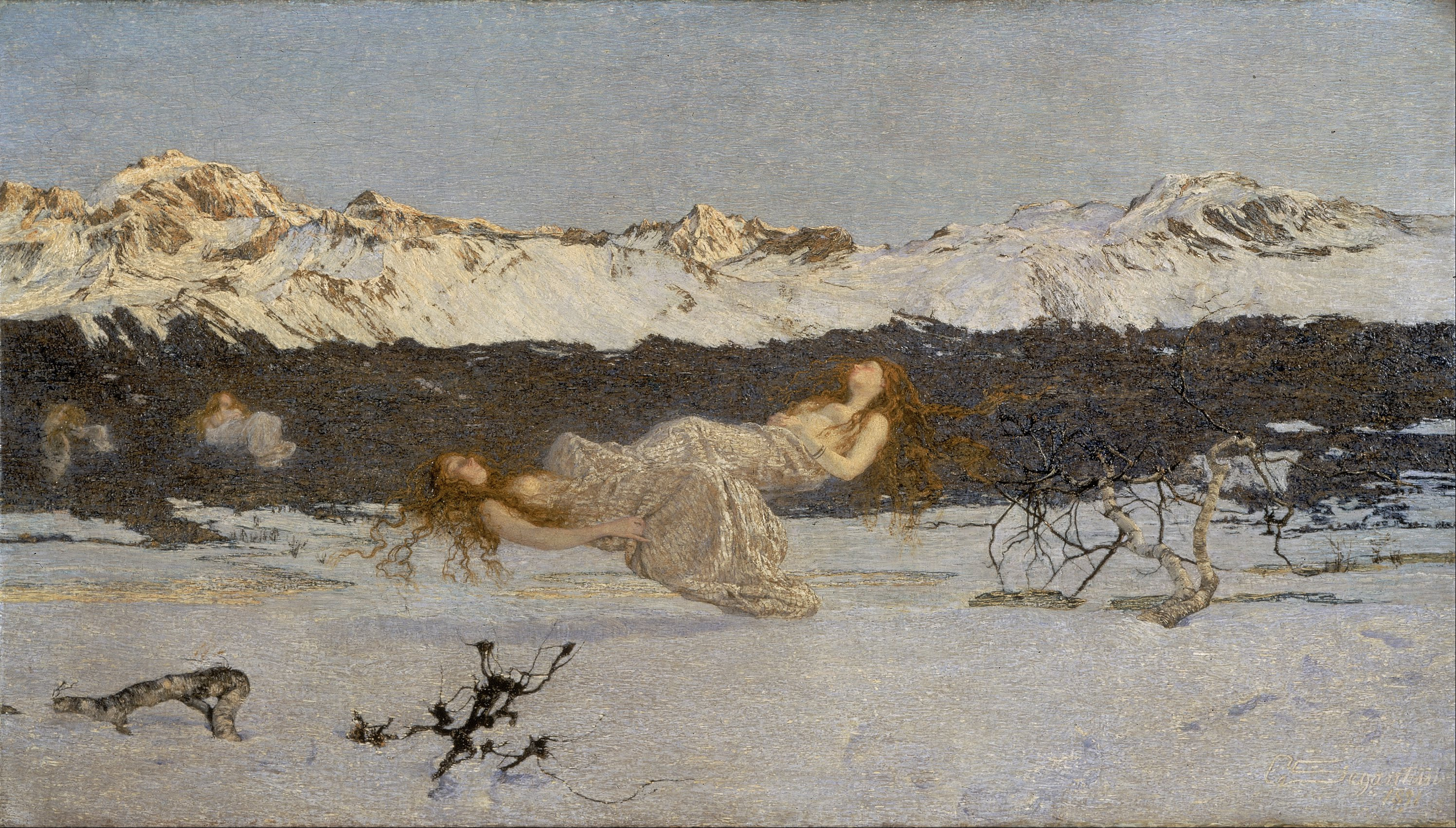
Giovanni Segantini - The Punishment of Lust

The following year, Segantini returned to Milan and attended classes at the Brera Academy. While there, he became friends with members of a transformative movement known as Scapigliatura (the "Disheveleds"), which included artists, poets, writers and musicians who sought to erase the differences between art and life. Among his closest friends at the time were Carlo Bugatti and Emilio Longoni, both of whom profoundly influenced his work and his interests.

His first major painting, The Chancel of Sant'Antonio (Il Coro di Sant'Antonio), was noticed for its powerful quality, and in 1879 it was acquired by Milan's Società per le Belle Arti. That work attracted the attention of painter and gallery owner Vittore Grubicy de Dragon, who became his advisor, dealer and lifelong financial supporter. Grubicy and his brother, Alberto, who was a co-owner of the gallery, introduced Segantini to the works of Anton Mauve and Jean-François Millet. Both of these artists influenced Segantini's work for many years.

That same year, he met Bugatti's sister, Luigia Pierina Bugatti (1862–1938), known as "Bice", and they began a lifelong romance. Although Segantini tried to marry Bice the next year, due to his stateless status, he could not be granted the proper legal papers. In opposition to this bureaucratic technicality, they decided to live together as an unmarried couple. This arrangement led to frequent conflicts with the Catholic church that dominated the region at this time, and they were forced to relocate every few years to avoid local condemnation.

In spite of these difficulties, Segantini was thoroughly devoted to Bice throughout his life. He wrote many love letters when he was away from her, sometimes including wild flowers that he had picked. Once he wrote, "Take these unsightly flowers, these violets, as a symbol of my great love, When a spring comes in which I fail to send you such violets, you will no longer find me among the living."

In 1880, he and Bice moved to Pusiano and soon thereafter to the village of Carella, where they shared a house with their friend Longoni. It was in this mountain scenery that Segantini began to paint en plein air, preferring to work outdoors rather than in a studio. While he worked outside, Bice would read to him, and eventually he learned to read and write. Later he would write articles for Italian art magazines, and he was a prolific letter writer to Bice when he travelled and to other artists throughout Europe.

At this time, he painted the first version of Ave Maria (Segantini Museum, St. Moritz), which took a gold medal at the 1883 World's Fair in Amsterdam. As his fame rose, Segantini entered into a formal agreement with the Grubicys to be the sole representatives of his work. While this allowed Segantini more freedom to pursue his artistry, the dealers were consistently slow in fulfilling their financial obligations to the artists. The family struggled for many years in relative poverty, even as Bice gave birth to four children: Gottardo (1882–1974), Alberto (1883–1904), Mario (1885–1916) and Bianca (1886–1980). To help Bice care for his family, Segantini employed a young maid, Barbara "Baba" Uffer, who also became his favourite model for his paintings. Baba stayed with the family throughout their periods of penury and many households, but unlike many artist/model relationships of the time, there is no evidence that they had any romantic involvement.

During this period, Segantini produced several important paintings using Baba as a model, including Mothers, After a Storm in the Alps, A Kiss and Moonlight Effect (Musée des Beaux-Arts, Rouen).

In 1886, Segantini sought a less expensive place to live and, attracted by the beautiful mountain scenery, he moved his family to Savognin, Graubünden. From November 1886 to March 1887, Grubicy stayed with the Segantinis in their new home. Excited by the recent work of Mauve and others, Grubicy suggested that Segantini further separate his colours in order to increase their brilliance. The artist applied this advice to a second version of Ave Maria, in which he used the Divisionist painting technique for the first time. His bolder style was immediately acclaimed by audiences; Segantini received gold medals in Munich (for Midday in the Alps) and Turin (for Ploughing). The following year, the Walker Art Gallery in Liverpool purchased his major painting, The Punishment of Lust.

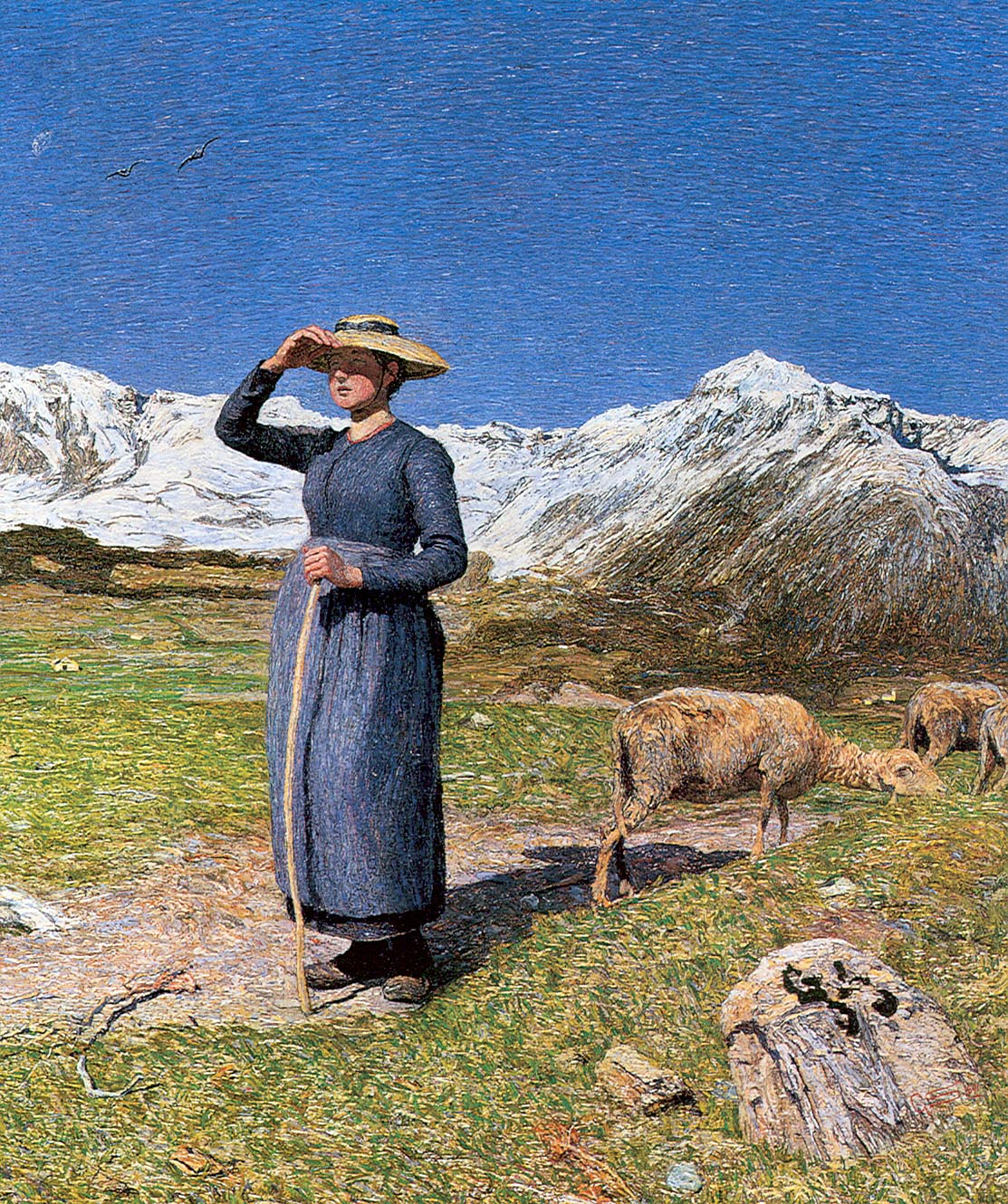
Midday in the Alps, 1891. Segantini Museum, St. Moritz

It is thought that Grubicy introduced the concept of Symbolism to Segantini during his recent visit. Because of his connections with artists in France, Grubicy would have known about the recently published Symbolist Manifesto by Jean Moréas. This essay is credited with introducing visual artists to the then nascent literary movement led by Charles Baudelaire, Stéphane Mallarmé, and Paul Valéry.

At the 1890 Salon des XX in Brussels, Segantini was given an entire exhibition room, an honour awarded to greats such as Cézanne, Gauguin and Van Gogh. While his fame had increased throughout Europe, he was never able to attend international shows because he could not obtain a passport due to his stateless status. Frustrated that the government would not grant him citizenship papers in spite of his fame, Segantini refused to pay cantonal taxes in Savognin. After creditors pursued him he moved his family to the Engadin valley (altitude 5,954 feet/1,815 meters) in another part of Switzerland. There, the high mountain passes and clear light become his chief subject matter for the next five years.

After he moved higher into the mountains, he began to study philosophy, concentrating on those writers who questioned the meaning of life and one's place in the natural world. He studied Maeterlinck, D'Annunzio and Goethe and especially Nietzsche, becoming so fascinated with the latter that he drew an illustration for the first Italian translation of Thus Spoke Zarathustra.

Soon after arriving, he made the acquaintance of Giovanni Giacometti, father of Alberto Giacometti, and an artist in his own right. Giacometti would later paint a portrait of Segantini on his deathbed and complete some of Segantini's unfinished works posthumously. Segantini also met and corresponded at length with Giuseppe Pellizza da Volpedo, an Italian Neo-Impressionist whose color techniques he admired.

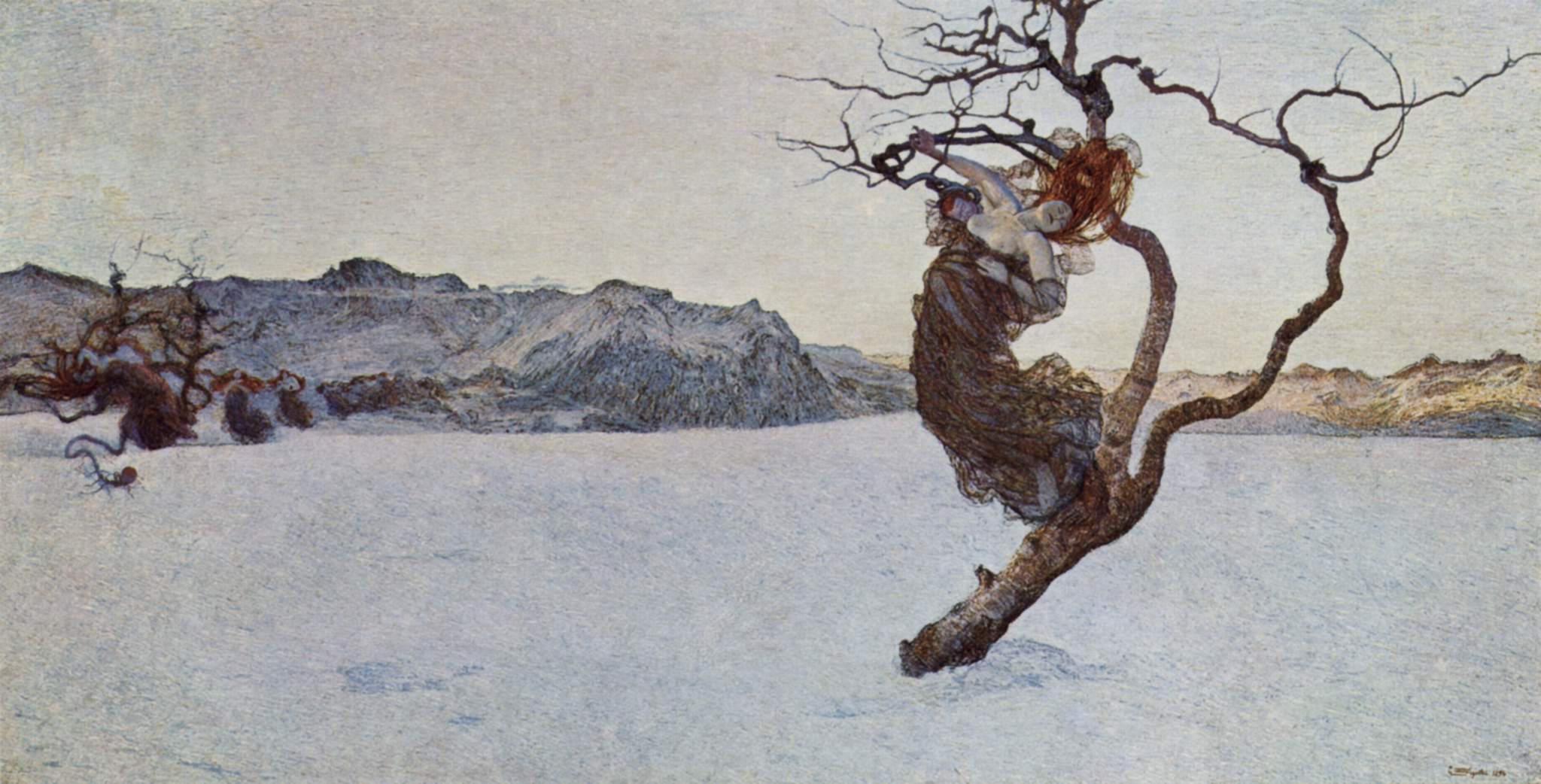
The Bad Mothers, 1894. Österreichische Galerie Belvedere

Segantini continued to gain recognition in Italy, and in 1894 the Castello Sforzesco in Milan put on a retrospective of ninety of his works. At the first Venice Biennale in 1895, Segantini was awarded the Prize of the Italian State for his painting Return to the Homeland. He continued to gain fame when a whole room was devoted to his work in the Munich Secession in 1896. After seeing his painting The Sad Hour in Munich, the director of the Alte Nationalgalerie in Berlin purchased the work for that museum. That same year his painting Ploughing is bought by the Neue Pinakothek in Munich.

In 1897, Segantini was commissioned by a group of local hotels to build a huge panorama of the Engadin valley to be shown in a specially built round hall at the 1900 Exposition Universelle in Paris. For this project, he worked almost exclusively outdoors on large canvases covered by substantial wooden shelters. Before it was completed, however, the project had to be scaled down for financial reasons. Segantini redesigned the concept into a large triptych known as Life, Nature and Death (Segantini Museum, St. Moritz), which is now his most famous work. He continued to work on it until his death.

Segantini's importance as an international artist was further established that same year, when the Austrian state financed a luxury monograph on his work. Museums throughout Europe vied to buy his paintings, including The Comfort of Faith, purchased by the Hamburger Kunsthalle and The Bad Mothers (Österreichische Galerie Belvedere, Vienna), bought by the Vienna Secession. In 1899, an entire room was devoted to Segantini's work at the annual exhibition of the Société des Beaux-Arts in Brussels.

Eager to finish the third part of his large triptych, Nature (Segantini Museum, St. Moritz), Segantini returned to the high altitude of the mountains near Schafberg. The pace of his work, coupled with the high altitude, affected his health, and in mid-September he became ill with acute peritonitis. Two weeks later he died. His son Mario and his partner Bice were with him at his deathbed.

At the end of November, a memorial exhibition of his works was put on display in Milan. Two years later, the largest Segantini retrospective to date took place in Vienna. In 1908, the Segantini Museum was established in St. Moritz, its design inspired by one of the sketches for the pavilions for the Engadine Panorama.

== Themes ==
More than anything else, Segantini's work represents the quintessential transition from traditional nineteenth-century art to the changing styles and interests of the twentieth century. He began with simple scenes of common people living off the earth— peasants, farmers, shepherds—and moved toward a thematic symbolist style that continued to embody the landscapes around him while intertwining pantheistic images representing "a primaeval Arcadia". Over the course of his life, he moved from both the physical and emotional internal, such as his scene of motherhood in a stable, to the grand external views of the mountain scenery where he chose to live.

Nature and the connections of people to nature are the core themes of his art. After he moved to the mountains, he wrote, "I am now working passionately in order to wrest the secret of Nature's spirit from her. Nature utters the eternal word to the artist: love, love; and the earth sings life in spring, and the soul of things reawakens."

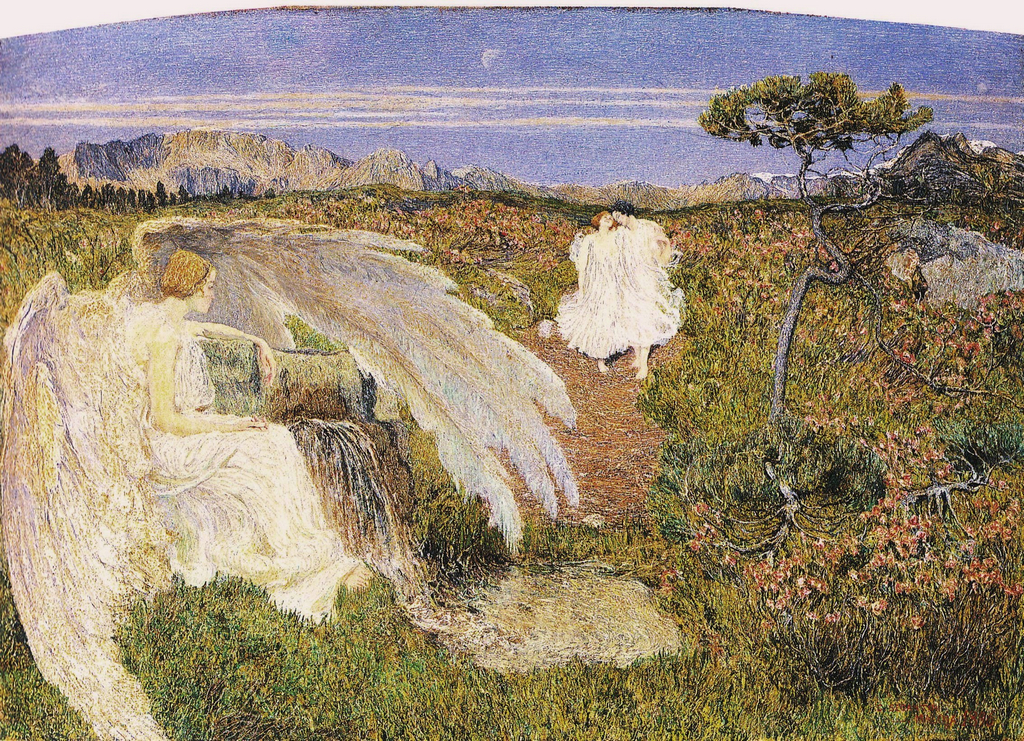
Love at the Fountain of Life (1896) by Giovanni Segantini

His 1896 painting Love at the Fountain of Life (Galleria Civica d'Arte Moderna, Milan) reflects Segantini's philosophical approach to his art. Set in the high mountain landscape near his home, it pictures an angel with large wings spread over a small waterfall flowing from some rocks. In the distance, two lovers, clothed in white flowing robes, walk along a path coming toward the spring. Around them are flowers that would have been seen by viewers at the time as symbols of love and life.

Art historian Robert Rosenblum described Segantini as transforming "the earthbound into the spiritual", and the artist himself referred to his work as "naturalist Symbolism". He said, "I've got God inside me. I don't need to go to church."

== Personal life ==
In 1879, Segantini met Luigia Pierina "Bice" Bugatti (1862–1938), daughter of Luigi Bugatti and aunt of Ettore Bugatti and Rembrandt Bugatti, whom he tried to marry in 1880. However, due to his stateless status, he was not granted the legal papers required to do so. They remained together in concubinage. They had four children illegitimately;

- Gottardo Guido Segantini (1882–1974) became a sculptor, married German-born Charlotte Poertner (1852–1912), originally of Darmstadt.
- Alberto Segantini (1883–1904)
- Mario Segantini (1885–1916),
- Bianca Segantini (1886–1980), an author

Segantini died on 28 September 1899 in Pontresina, Switzerland, aged 41. In 1902, all his children were naturalised as Swiss citizens whilst living in Davos.

== Gallery ==
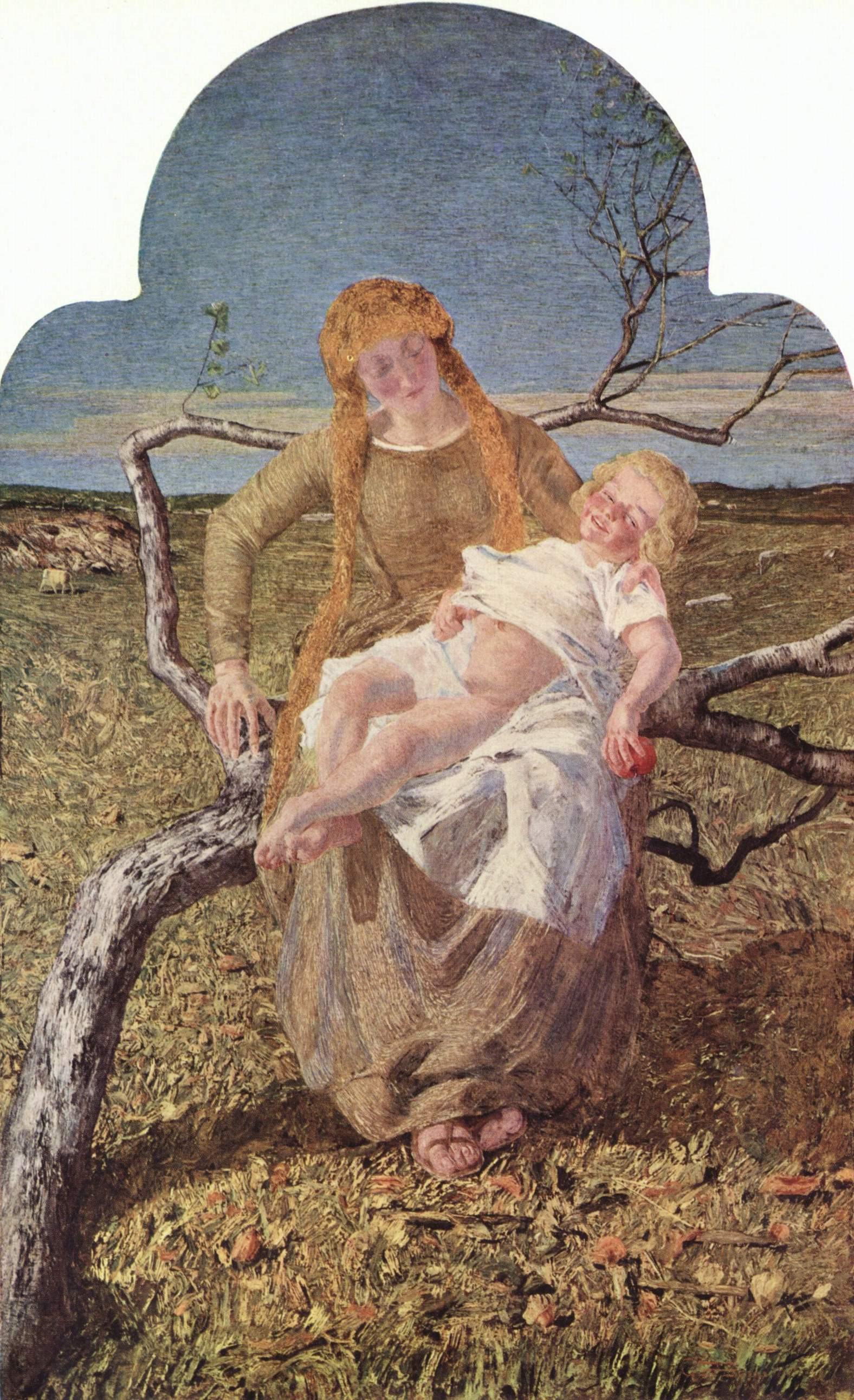
The Fruit of Life (1889)

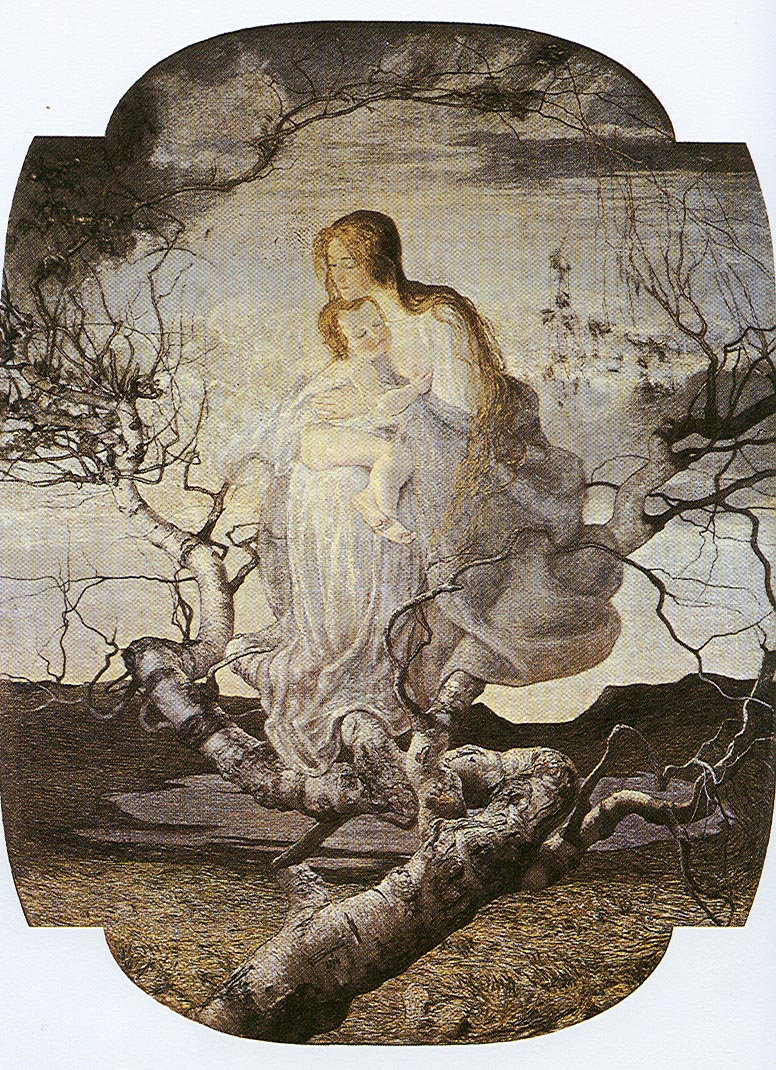
The Angel of Life (1894)
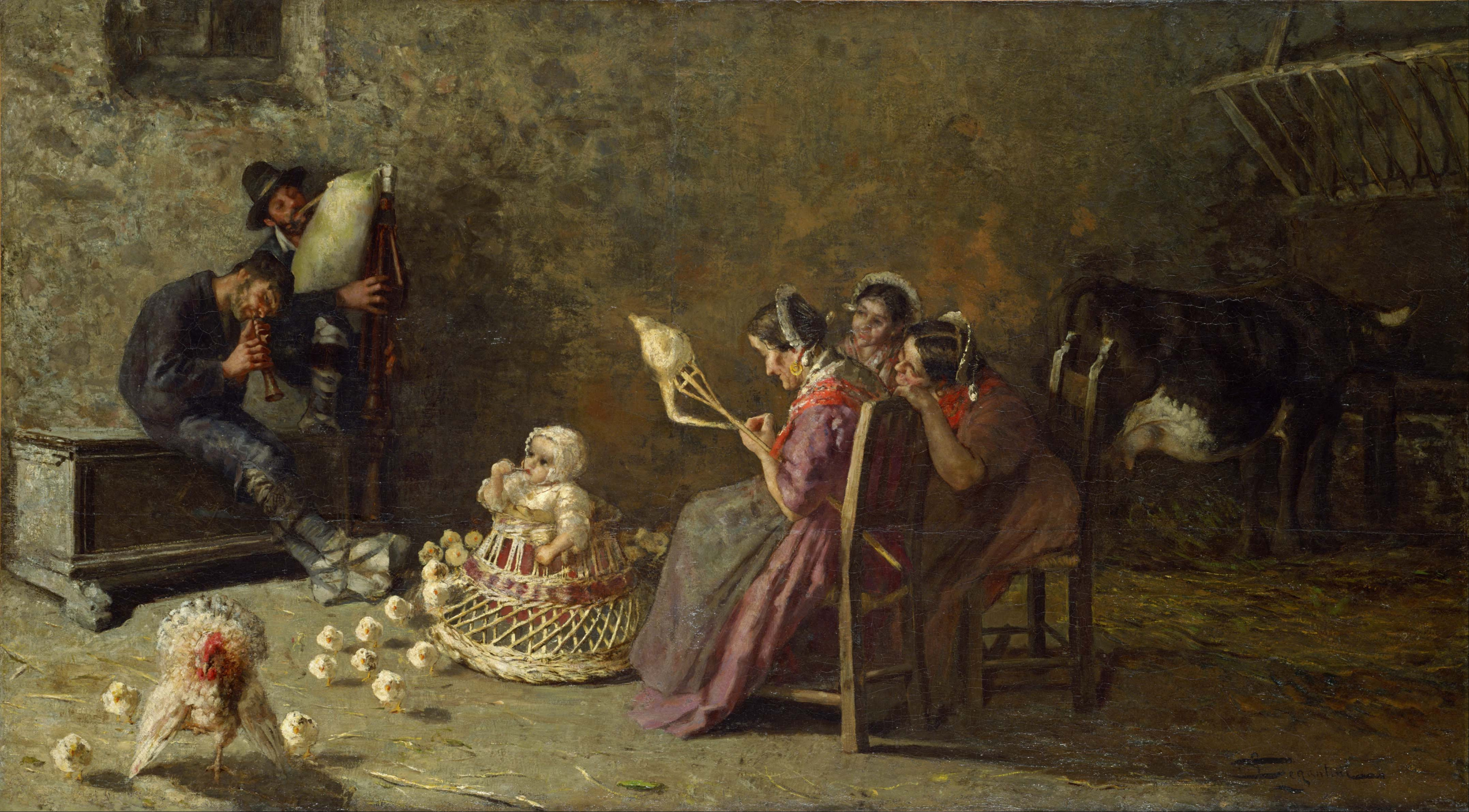
Bagpipers of Brianza, 1883–85

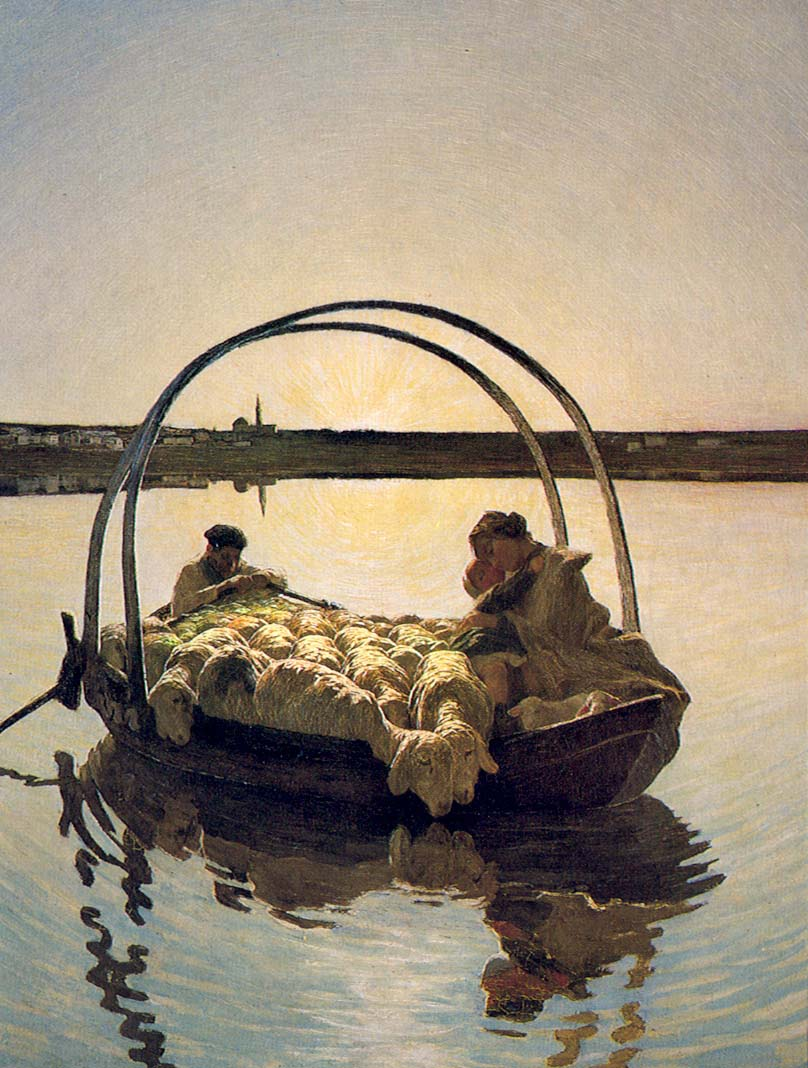
Ave Maria on the Lake, 1886

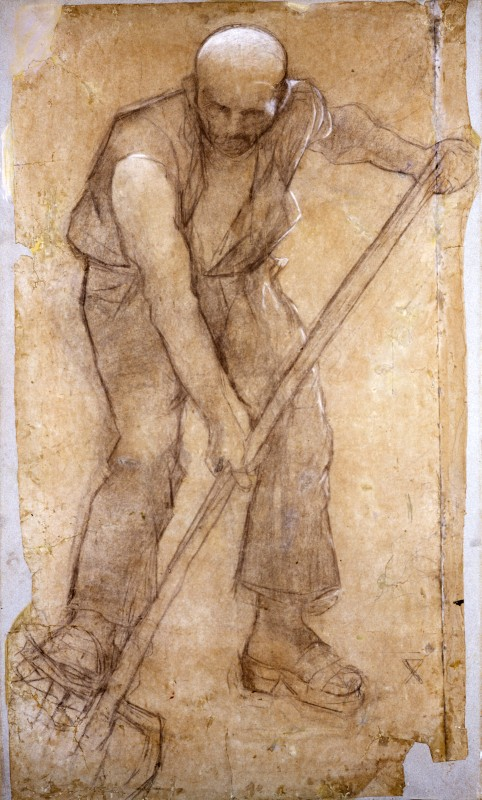
Il lavoratore della terra, 1886 (charcoal)

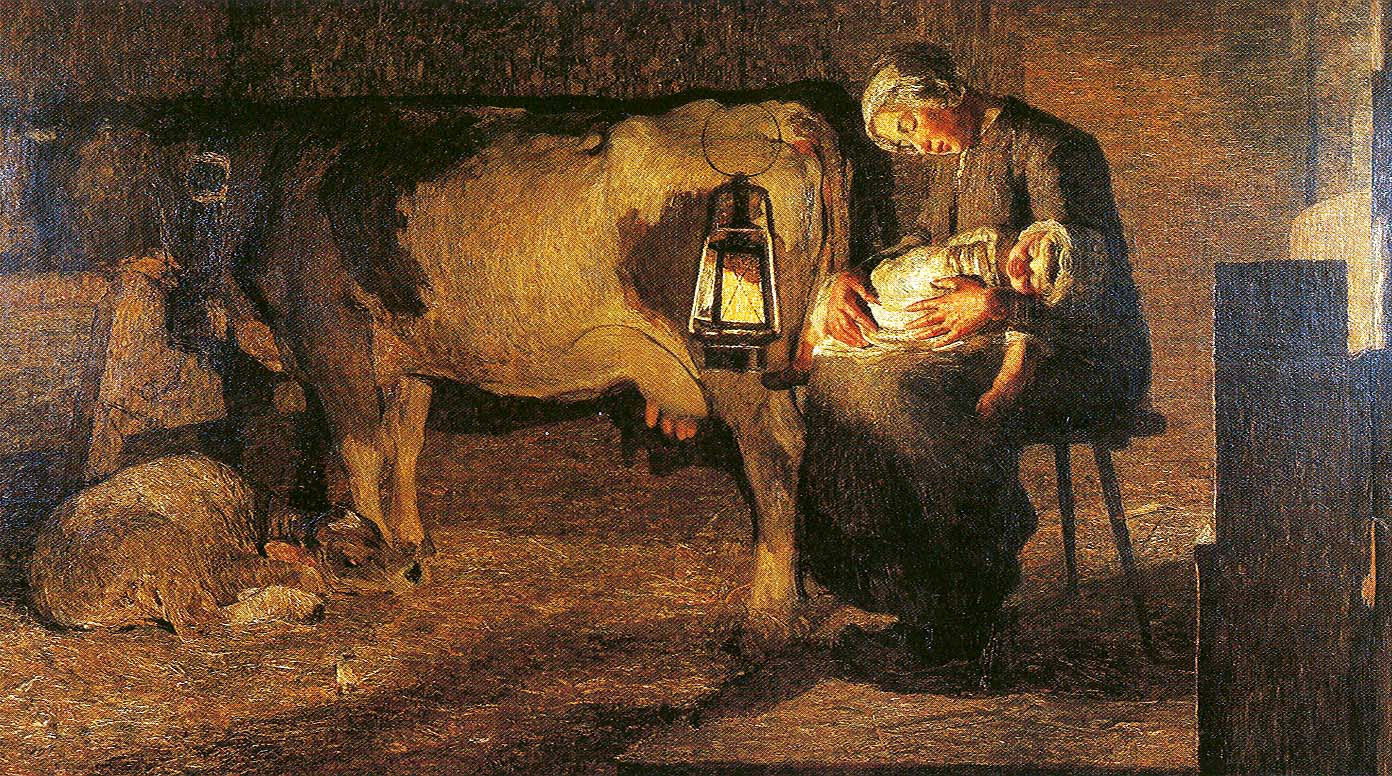
The Two Mothers, 1889

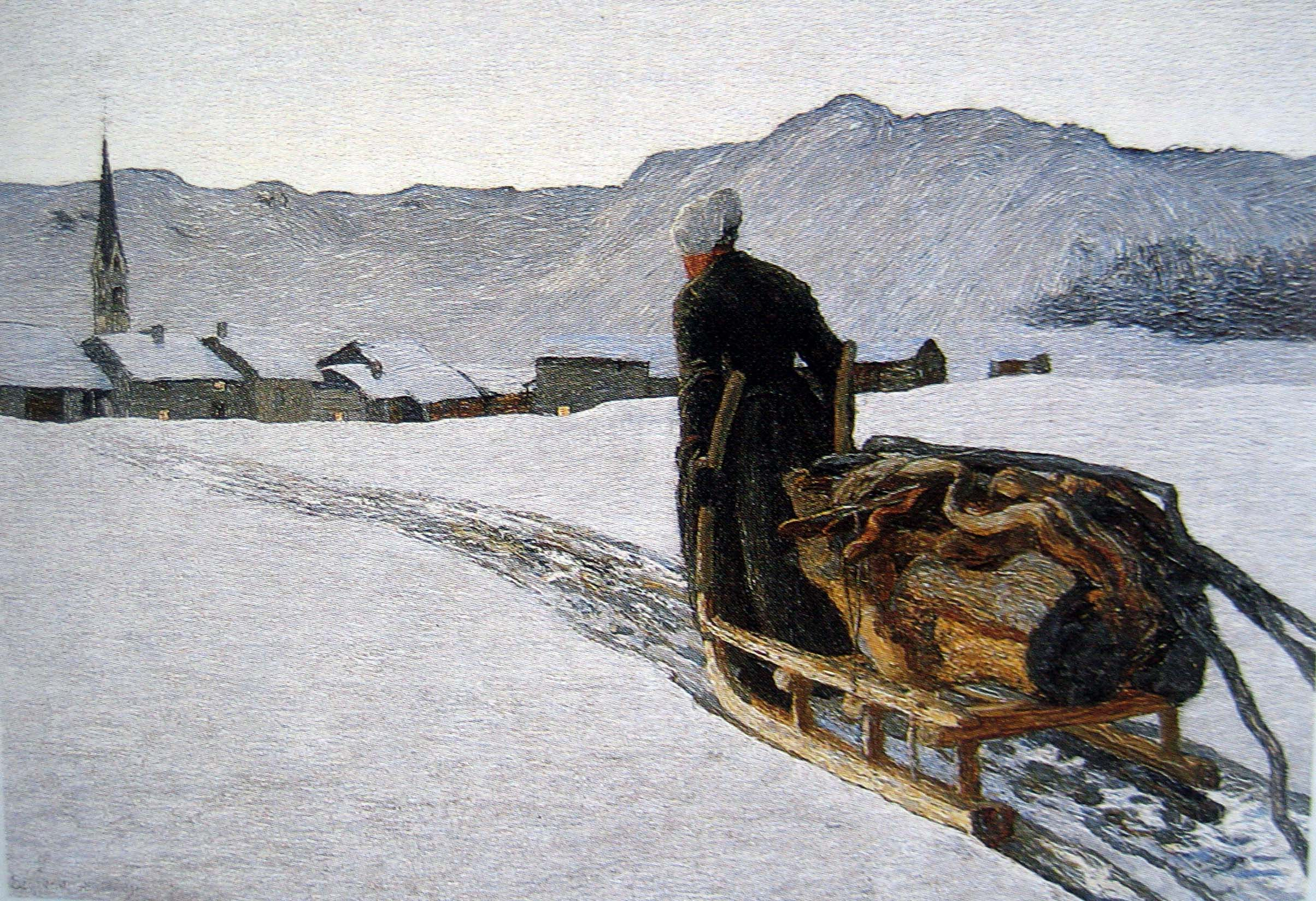
Return from the Woods, 1890

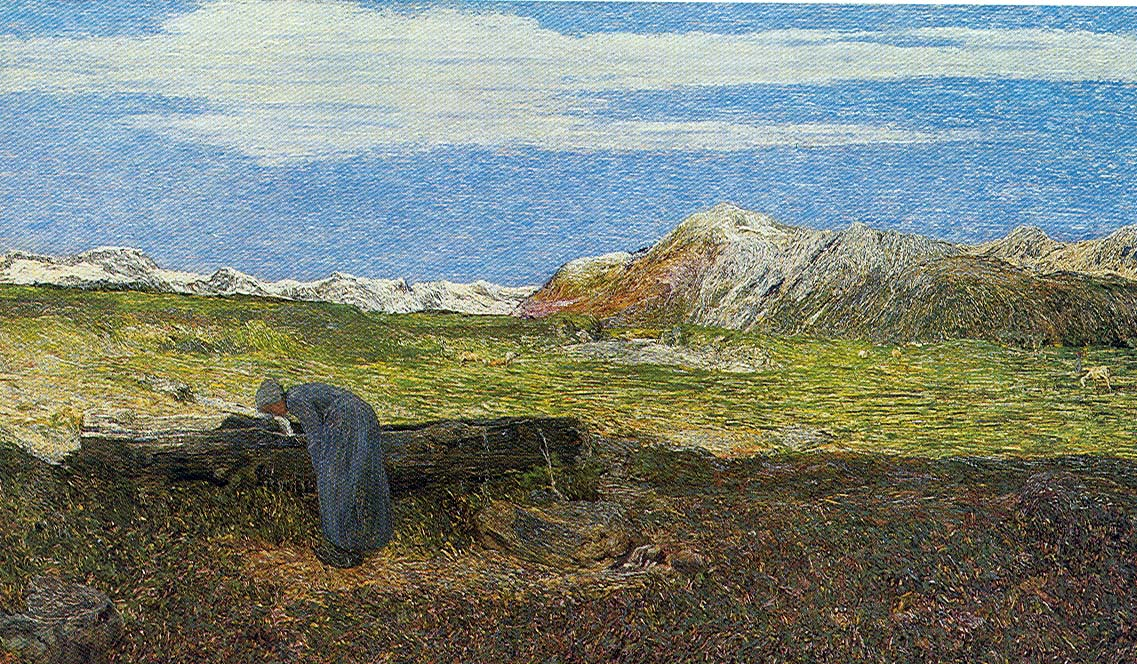
Alpine landscape, 1893–94

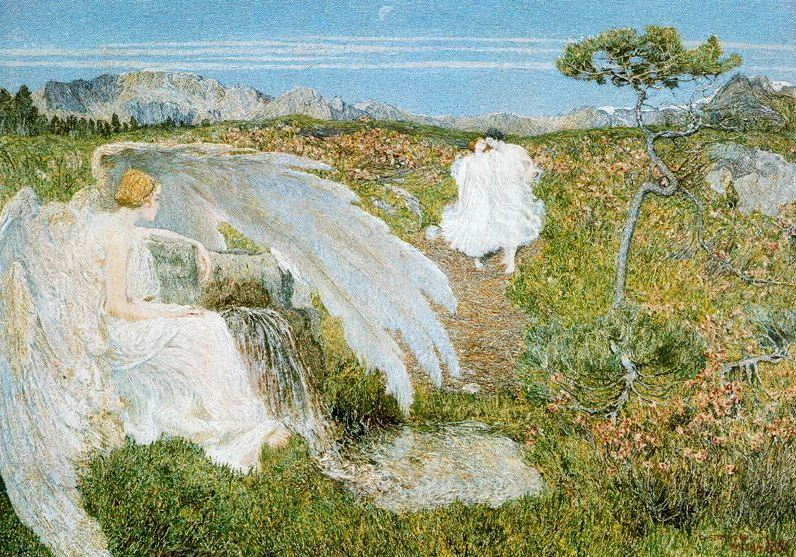
Love at the Fountain of Life, 1896.

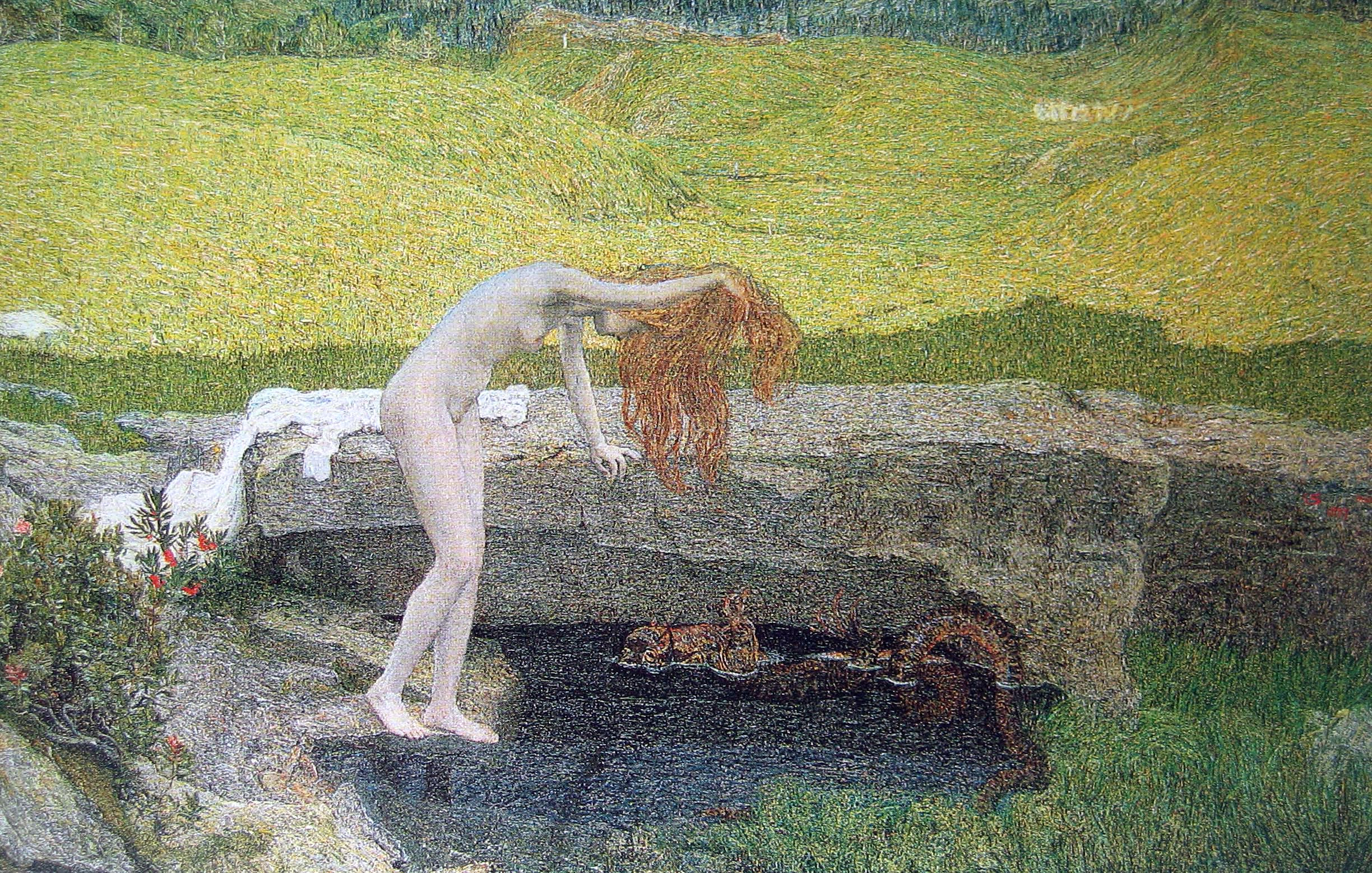
Vanitas, 1897

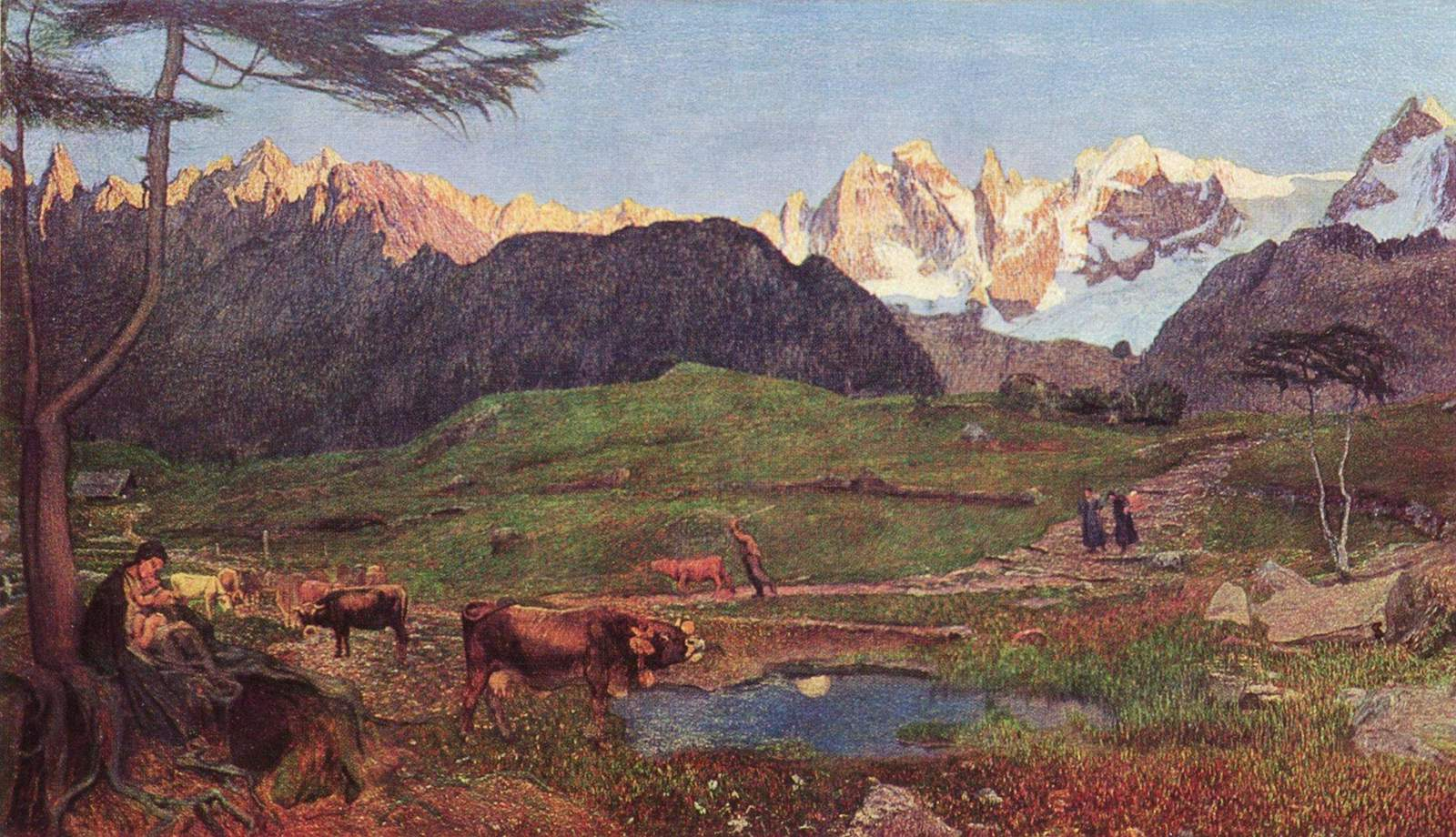
Alpine Triptych: Life, 1898–99

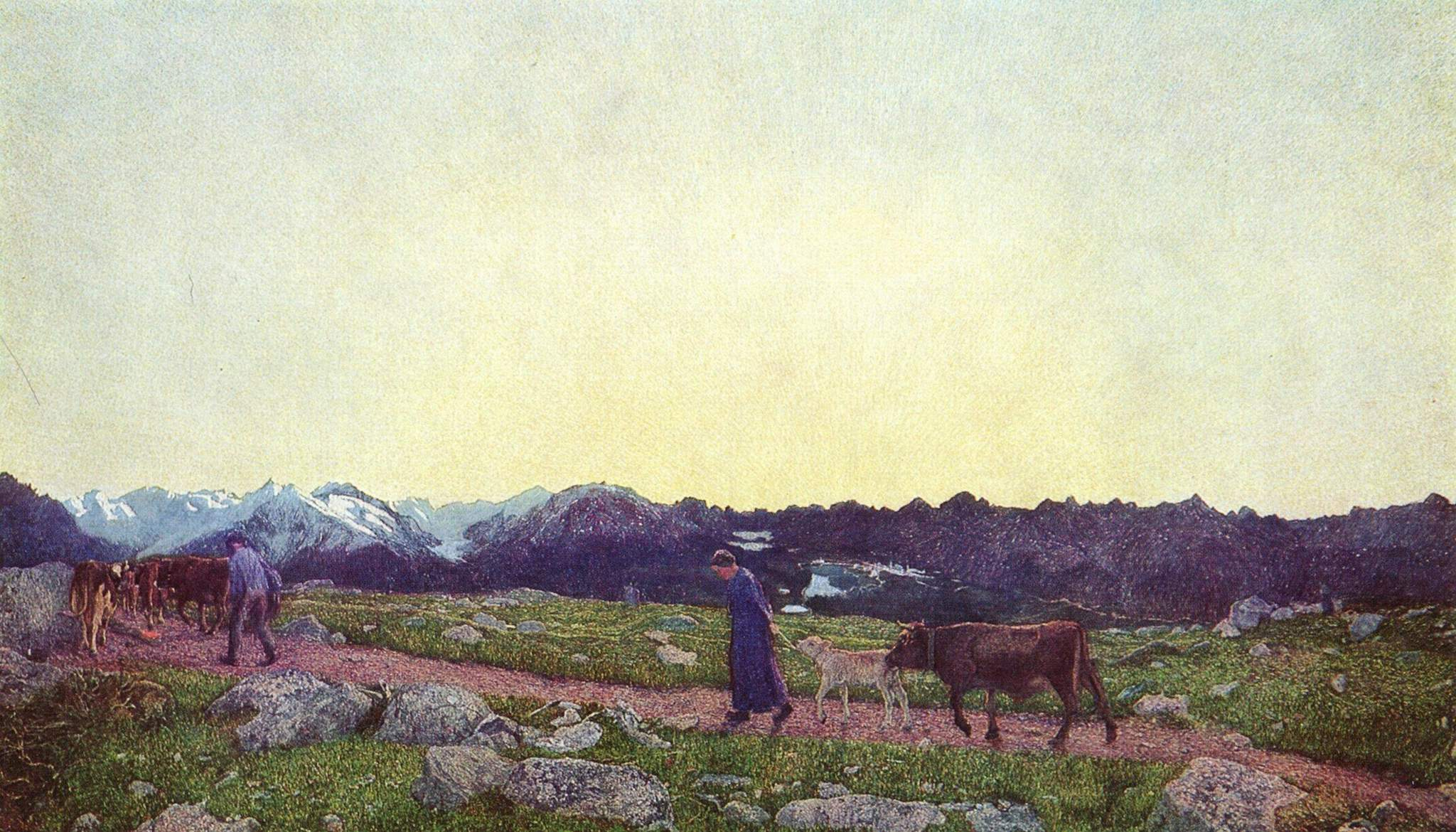
Alpine Triptych: Nature, 1898–99

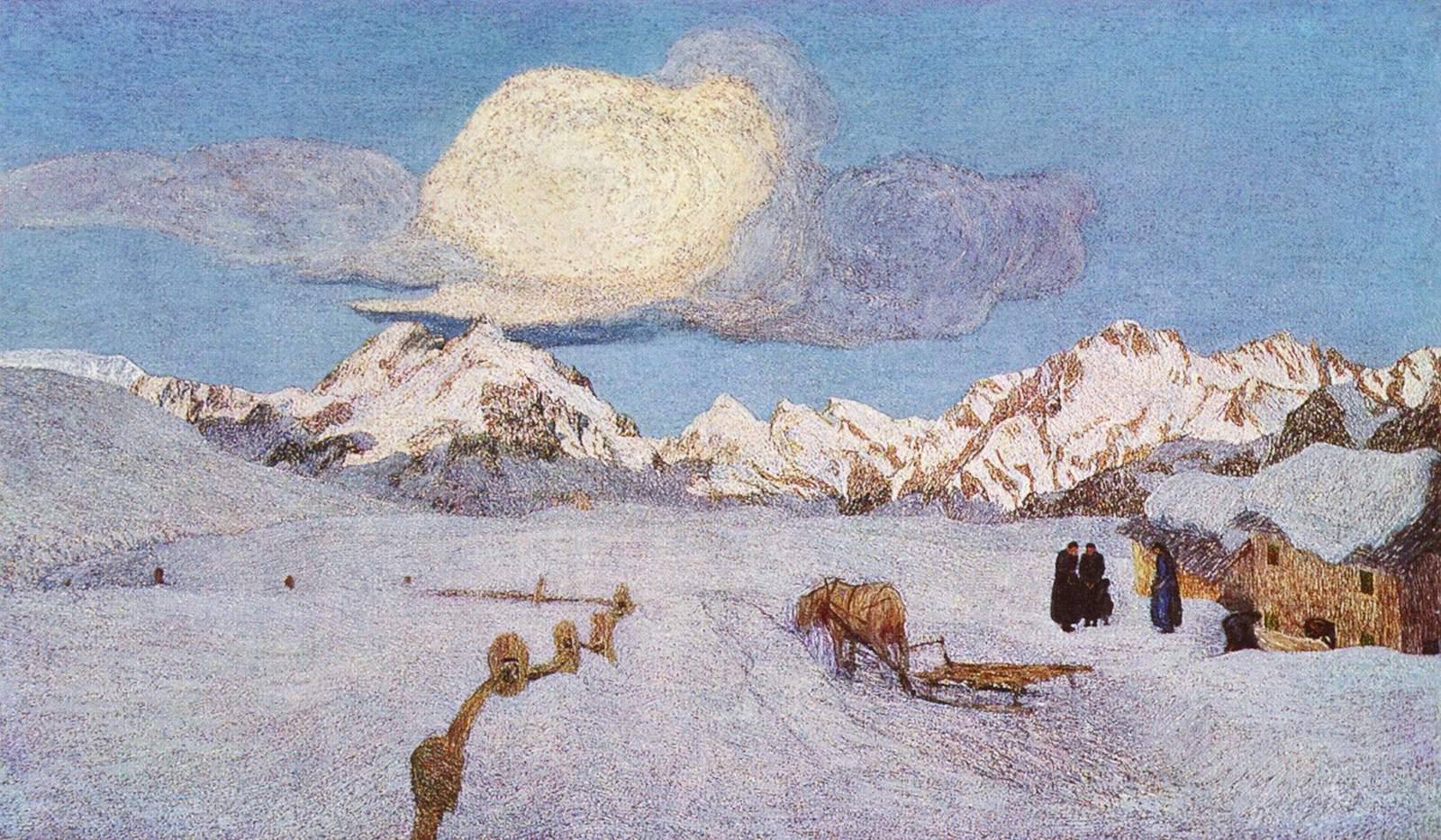
Alpine Triptych: Death, 1898–99

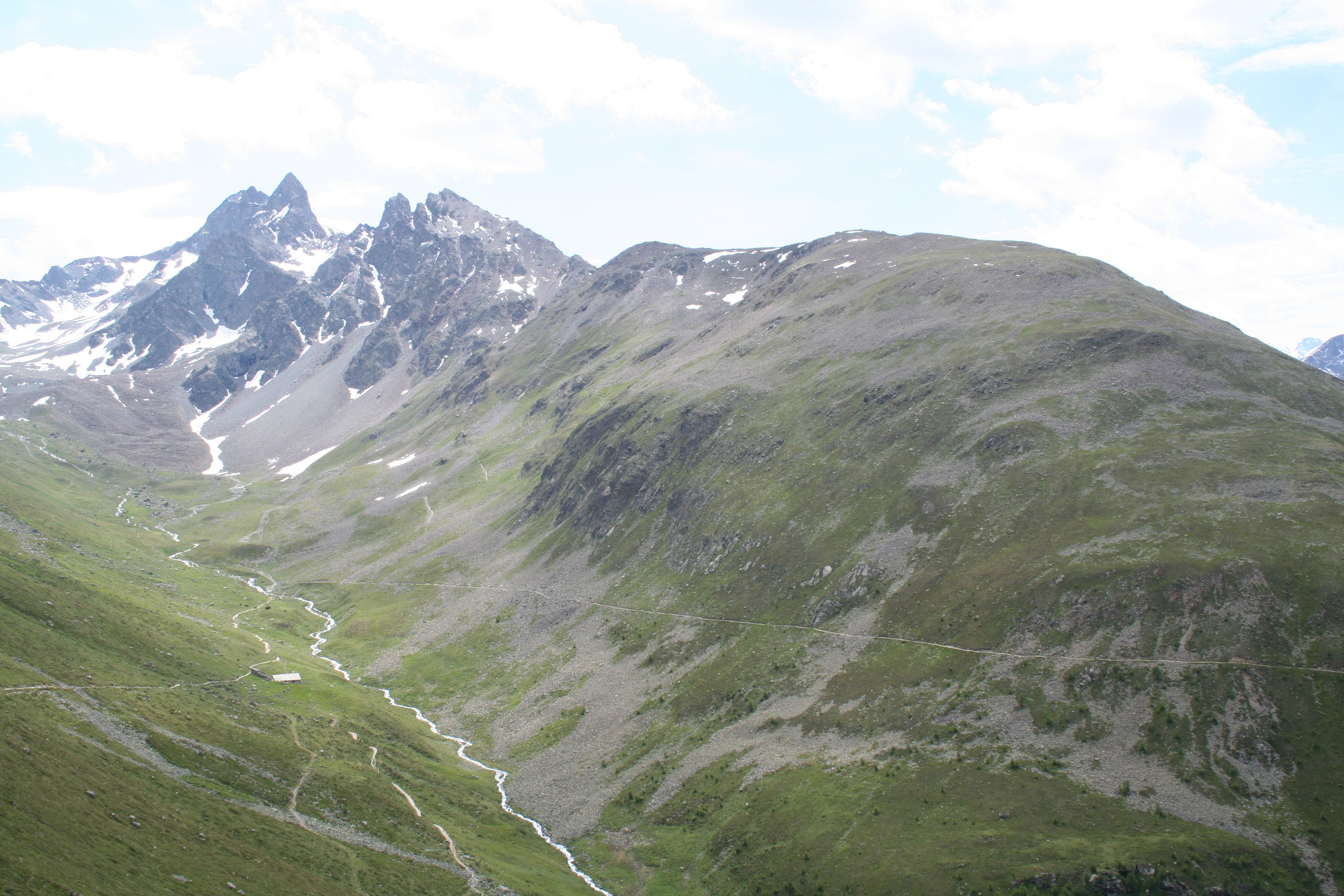
Segantinihütte (Death place of Giovanni Segantini) on top of the grassy summit

== Graubünden area ==
A signposted multiday trekking route passes areas that were common to the painter for his En plein air painting.

== Sources ==
- Armitage, John (2022-01-02). "Luxury, Voluptuousity, Levinas: on Jan Steen and Giovanni Segantini". Luxury. 9 (1): 59–80. doi:10.1080/20511817.2022.2117665. ISSN 2051-1817
- Bachmann, Dieter, Guido Magnaguagno, Sam Keller, Ulf Küster. Segantini Otsfildern: Hatje Cantz Verlag, 2011. ISBN 9783775727655
- Belli, G. and Annie-Paule Quinsac. Segantini. La vita, la natura, la morte. Disegni e dipint. Milan: Skira, 1999.
- Chisholm, Hugh, ed. (1911). "Segantini, Giovanni" . Encyclopædia Britannica. Vol. 24 (11th ed.). Cambridge University Press. pp. 581–582.
- Fondation Beyeler. Segantini: Mountain Worlds. Riehen: Fondation Beyeler, 2011. ISBN 978-3-7757-2765-5
- Fraquelli, Simonetta and others. Radical Light: Italy's Divisionist Painters, 1891-1910. London: National Gallery, 2008. ISBN 978-1-85709-409-1
- Gibson, Michael. Symbolism.Köln: Taschen, 1995. ISBN 3-8228-9324-2
- Greene, Vivian. Divisionism : Neo-Impressionism, Arcadia & Anarchy. NY: Guggenheim Museum, 2007. ISBN 978-0-89207-357-3
- ‘‘Dizionario degli Artisti Italiani Viventi: pittori, scultori, e Architetti.’’, by Angelo de Gubernatis. Tipe dei Successori Le Monnier, 1889, pages 465-468.
- Heslewood, Juliet. Lover: Portraits by 40 great artists. London: Frances Lincoln, 2011. ISBN 978-0-7112-3108-5
- Leykauf-Segantini, Gioconda. Giovanni Segantini 1858-1899: Aus Schriften und Briefen / Da scritti e lettere. Hof/Majola: Innquell Verlag, 2000. ISBN 3-00-004997-5
- Montreal Museum of Fine Arts. Lost Paradise: Symbolist Europe. Montreal: Montreal Museum of Fine Arts, 1995. ISBN 2-89192-194-1
- Quinsac, Annie-Paule. Giovanni Segantini 1858-1899. Zürich: Kunsthaus, 1990.
- Quinsac, Annie-Paule. Segantini: Catalogo Generale. Milan: Electa, 1982. ISBN 978-88-435-0731-3
- Quinsac, Annie-Paule and Robert Rosenblum. Giovanni Segantini: Luce & Simbolo / Light & Symbol 1884-1899. Milan, Skira, 2001.
- Rapetti, Rodolphe. Symbolism. Paris: Flammaron, 2005. ISBN 2-08-030492-5
- Ritter, William. Giovanni Segantini. Vienna: Verlag der Gesellschaft für vervielfältigende Kunst, 1897.
- Stutzer, Beat and others. Giovanni Segantini. Otsfildern: Hatje Cantz Verlag, 1999. ISBN 978-3-7757-0564-6
- Stutzer, Beat. Das Segantini Museum. Zürich: Scheidegger & Spiess, 2008. ISBN 978-3-85881-234-6
- Villari, Luigi. Giovanni Segantini. BiblioLife, 2009 (reprint of 1901 edition). ISBN 978-1-115-53134-4
