= Ancona Cathedral =

Roman Catholic cathedral in Ancona, Italy

Ancona Cathedral (Metropolitan Cathedral-Basilica of Saint Cyriacus) Basilica Cattedrale Metropolitana di San Ciriaco
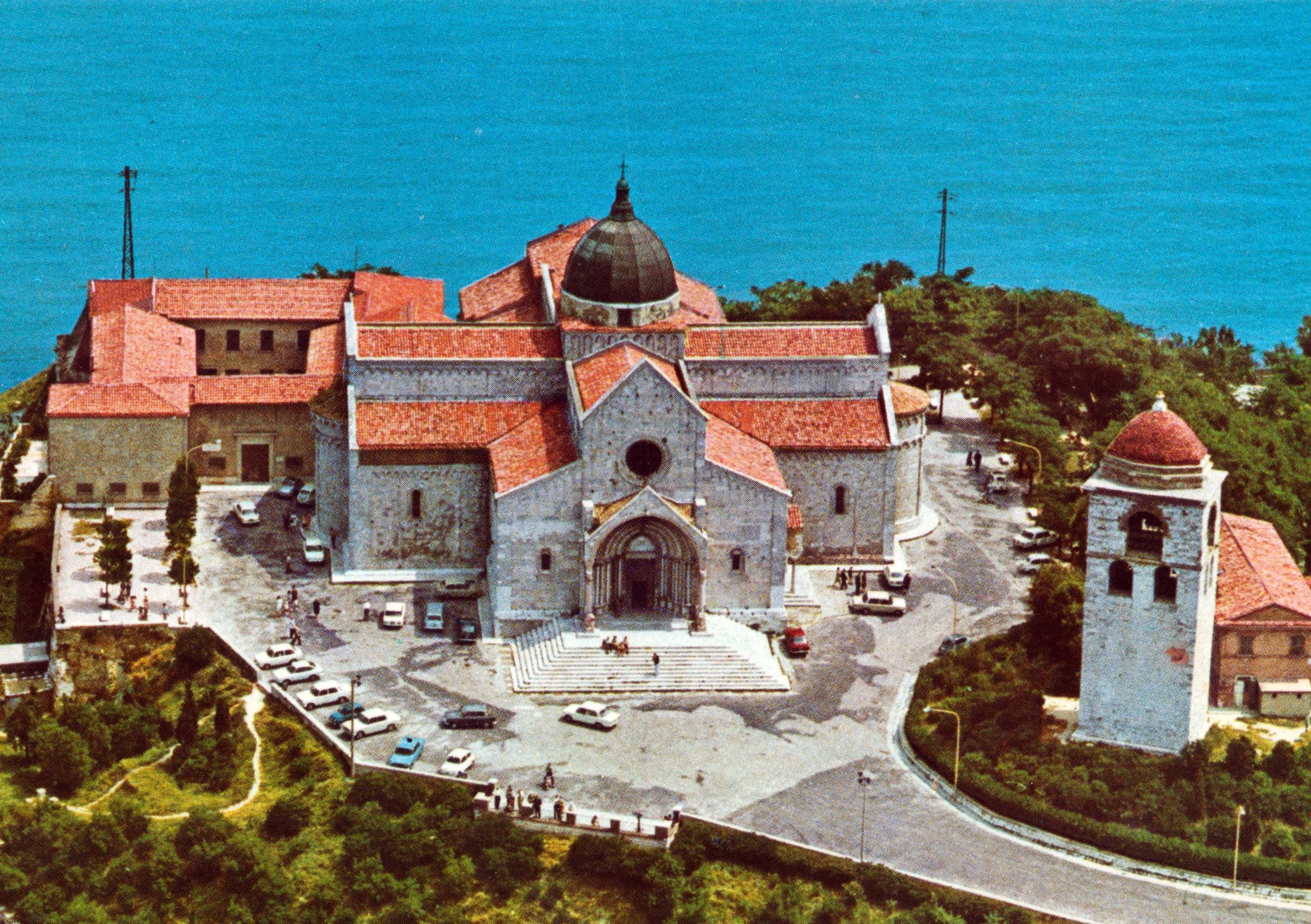

Religion
- Affiliation: Roman Catholic
- Province: Archdiocese of Ancona-Osimo
- Ecclesiastical or organisational status: Cathedral

Location
- Location: Ancona, Italy
- Interactive map of Ancona Cathedral (Metropolitan Cathedral-Basilica of Saint Cyriacus); Basilica Cattedrale Metropolitana di San Ciriaco
- Coordinates: 43°37′31″N 13°30′37″E

Architecture
- Type: Church
- Style: Romanesque - Byzantine
- Groundbreaking: 996
- Completed: 1017

Ancona Cathedral (Italian: Duomo di Ancona, Basilica Cattedrale Metropolitana di San Ciriaco) is a Roman Catholic cathedral in Ancona, central Italy, dedicated to Saint Cyriacus. It is the seat of the Archbishop of Ancona. The building is an example of mixed Romanesque-Byzantine and Gothic elements, and stands on the site of the former acropolis of the Greek city, the Guasco hill which overlooks Ancona and its gulf.

== History ==
Excavations carried on in 1932 indicated that a Greek temple was on the site as early as the 4rd century BC. A Christian basilica was built on top of it in the 6th century.

Between the 10th and 11th centuries the church was enlarged and became a cathedral; it had an entrance facing south-east (where the current Chapel of the Crucifix is). Further enlargement works occurred between the late 12th and the early 13th centuries, to obtain a Greek cross, a typically Byzantine plan, and a new entrance, towards the south-west, resulting in the church now facing the port and the ancient neighborhoods of the city. The old church became the transept of the new one.

In 1739, Luigi Vanvitelli designed a monumental pulpit in the left transept to display the seventeenth-century painting of the Virgin, the object of intense popular devotion.

In 1883 the basilica underwent a very impressive restoration by Giuseppe Sacconi, author of the project of the Altar of the Fatherland, in Rome. He restored it to its original austere medieval appearance, eliminating the decorations and overlapping plasters, which over the centuries had altered the original appearance of the church. However, he respected Vanvitelli's works for their artistic value.

During World War I and again in World War II bombings the church was damaged, and restored each time. The year 2000 marked the millennium of the cathedral's dedication with exhibitions, conferences, and publications.

== Description ==
=== Exterior ===
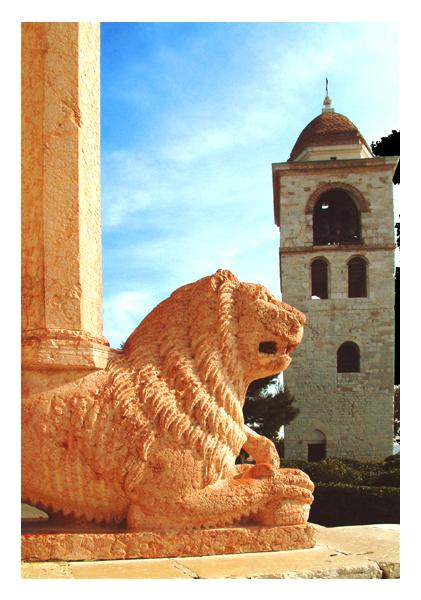
One of the red marble lions in the portal

The edifice is built in white stone from Mount Conero, with apses protruding from the transept's ends and an elevated body, with a dome at the crossing, in correspondence to the nave. All the external surfaces feature a decoration of Lombard bands. The bell tower is in an isolated position. It is mentioned from 1314 and was built above a pre-existing late 13th-century tower.

The façade, divided into three section, is preceded by a wide staircase; above it is a 13th-century Romanesque portal formed by a round arch supported by four columns. The anterior ones stand on lions in Veronese red marble, while the rear ones, added later by Luigi Vanvitelli, are on a simple pedestal. The lion on the right fights a basilisk, while the one on the right holds a ram in its paws.

Under the arches are four reliefs depicting the symbols of the Evangelists. The portal is attributed to Giorgio da Como (c. 1228), and is in Romanesque-Gothic style, built in Conero white stone from Mount Conero and Veronese red marble. It is decorated by a series of columns holding ogival arches with reliefs of saints' busts, animal figures and vegetable motifs. Above the portal is a large oculus with a Romanesque frame between two single mullioned windows.

The dome is one of the most ancient in Italy. It has an ogival shape with a dodecagonal drum, standing on a square base with small decorative arches. It was built over the crossing in the 13th century, and is attributed to Margaritone d'Arezzo (1270). Together with the church of Sant'Antonio at Padua and St. Mark's Basilica in Venice, it was one of the few contemporary examples of domes built in churches, instead than in separate baptisteries. The copper cover was added in the 16th century.

=== Interior ===
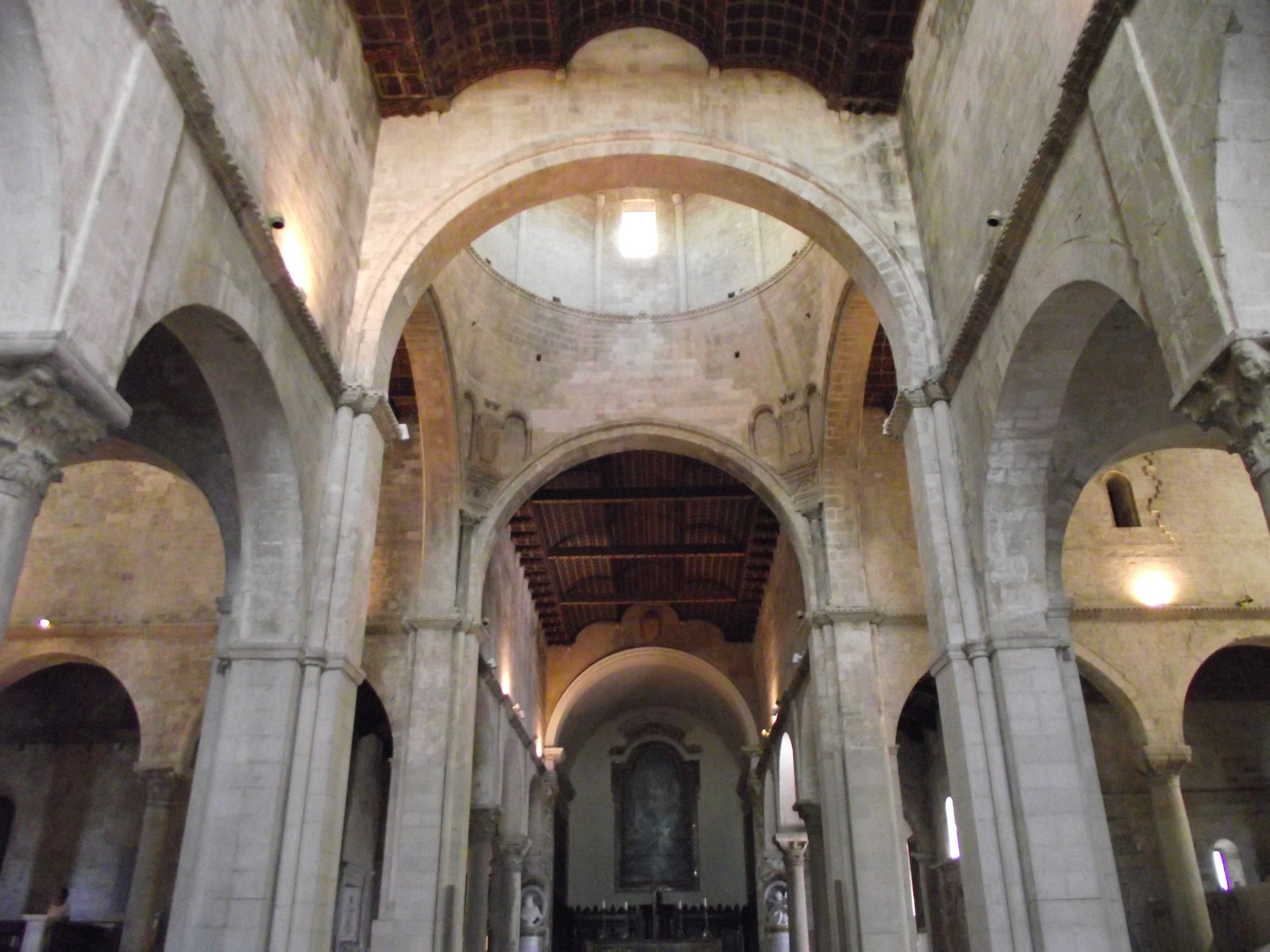
Interior view

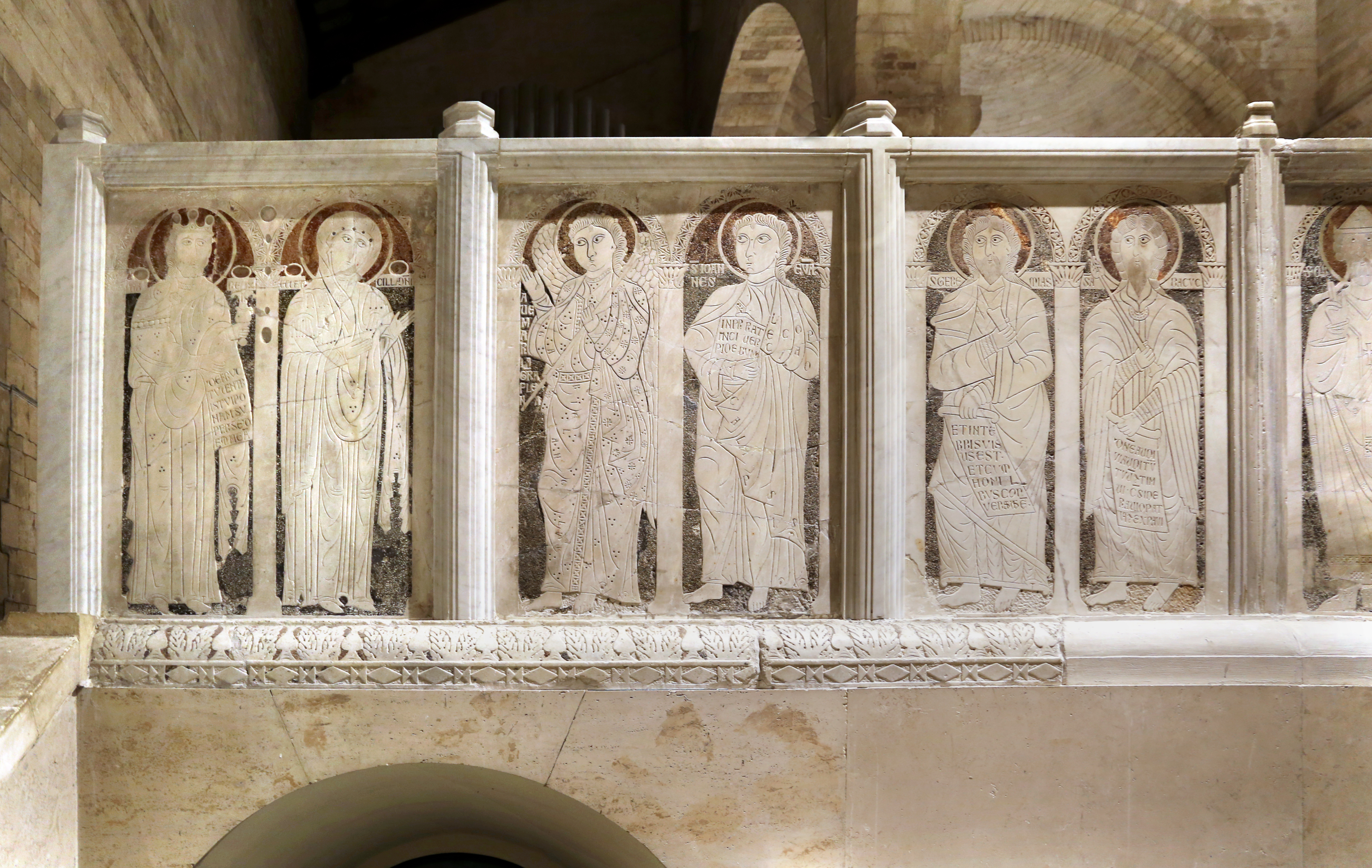
Byzantine sculptures in the Chapel of the Crucifix: King David, Virgin of the Annunciation, Archangel Gabriel, St. John the Evangelist, Jeremiah, Habakkuk, St. Cyriacus.

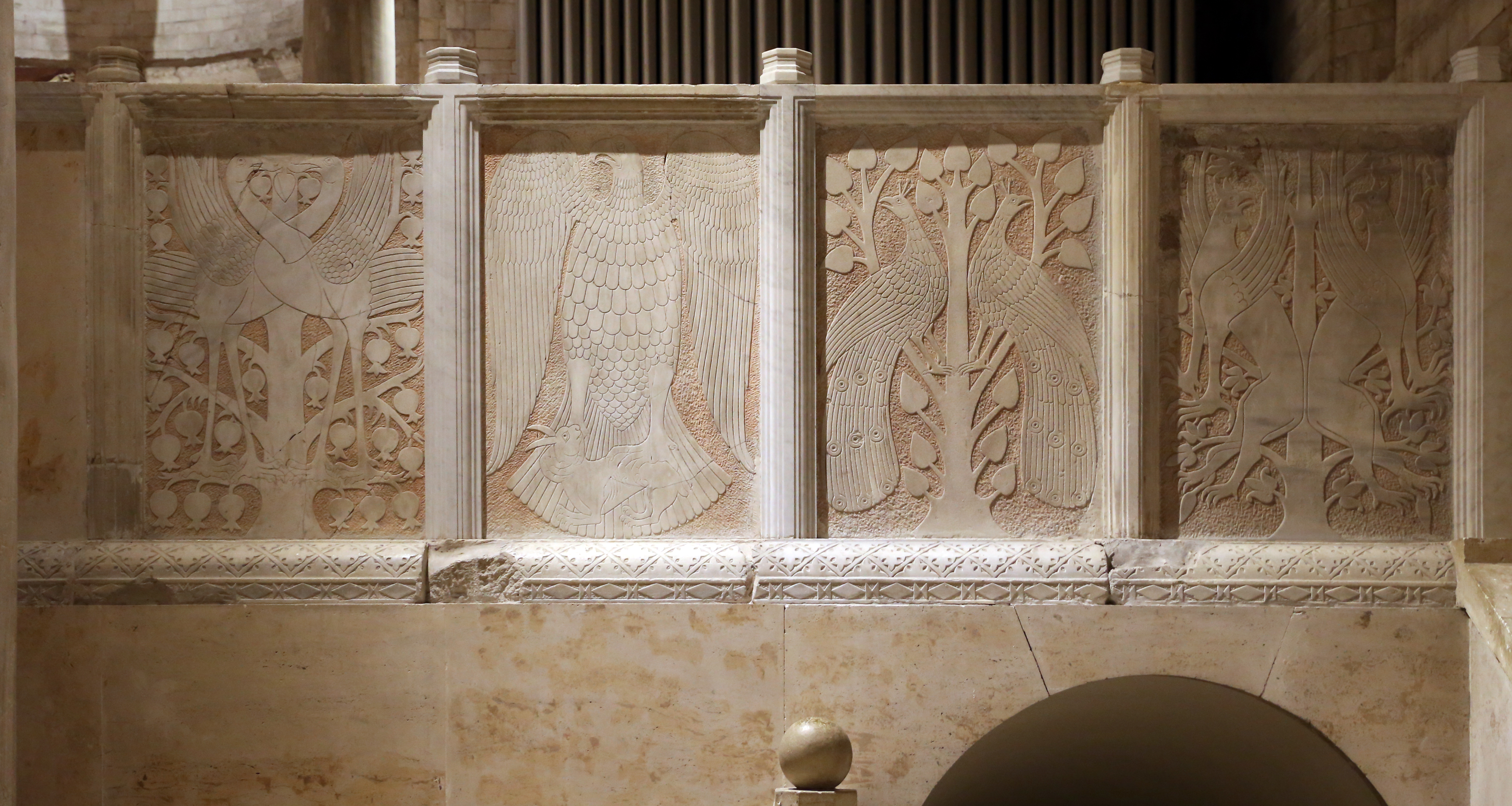
Byzantine sculptures in the Chapel of the Crucifix: phoenixes, eagles and rabbits, peacocks, griffins.

The interior is on the Greek cross plan. All the arms are divided into a nave and two aisles, with re-used antique Roman columns with Byzantine capitals. At the crossing is the internal part of the dome, which has pendentives with Byzantine-style figures of praying angels. The dome is supported by cruciform cluster piers.

The side arms of the transept end in elevated apses, while the central arm of the presbytery lost the original apse during the construction of the church choir of the 18th century. All the naves have hull-shaped, painted wooden vaults dating from the 15th century. At the beginning of the northern nave is the monument to a Fermo warrior from 1530.

The south transept is home to the Chapel of the Crucifix. Its screens (transennae) are formed by tiles with sgraffito decoration of 1189, of Byzantine art. They depict, on the left, king David and the Blessed Virgin annunciate, the Archangel Gabriel and Saint John the Evangelist, Jeremiah and Habakkuk; Saint Cyriacus. On the right, the transennae depict figures of animals: two phoenixes on a pomegranate tree, an eagle with a rabbit, two peacocksand on a tree with leaves and two gryphons on a lily tree. In the Crypt of Tears below, visitors can observe the archaeological area of the Greek temple.

The presbytery's arms house, in the northern aisles, the Renaissance sepulchre of Blessed Girolamo Ginelli (d. 1506), made in 1509 by Giovanni Dalmata.

The northern transept houses the Madonna Chapel, with a lavishly decorated niche designed by Luigi Vanvitelli in 1739, which is the site of a venerated 17th century image of the Madonna. Under the chapel is a crypt with the remains of Saint Cyriacus (in a marble case), Saints Liberius and Marcellinus (in Sicilian jasper) and the ashes of Saint Palatia. The urns with bronze festoons were designed and executed between 1757 and 1760 by Gioacchino Varlè.

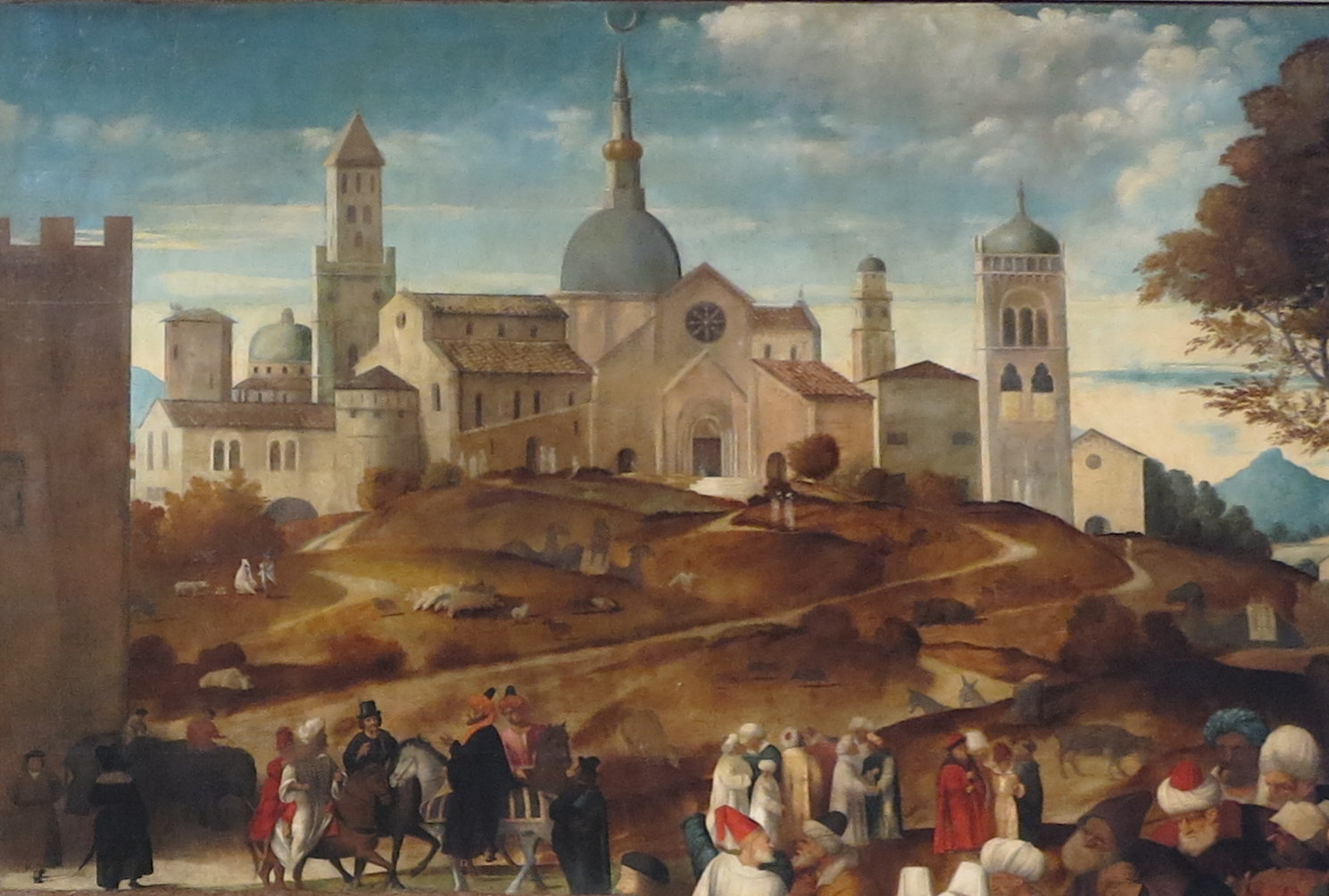
Martyrdom of Saint Mark (1526) Detail with the Cathedral of Ancona (Giovanni Bellini, Lorenzo Lotto and Vittore Belliniano)

=== Photos ===
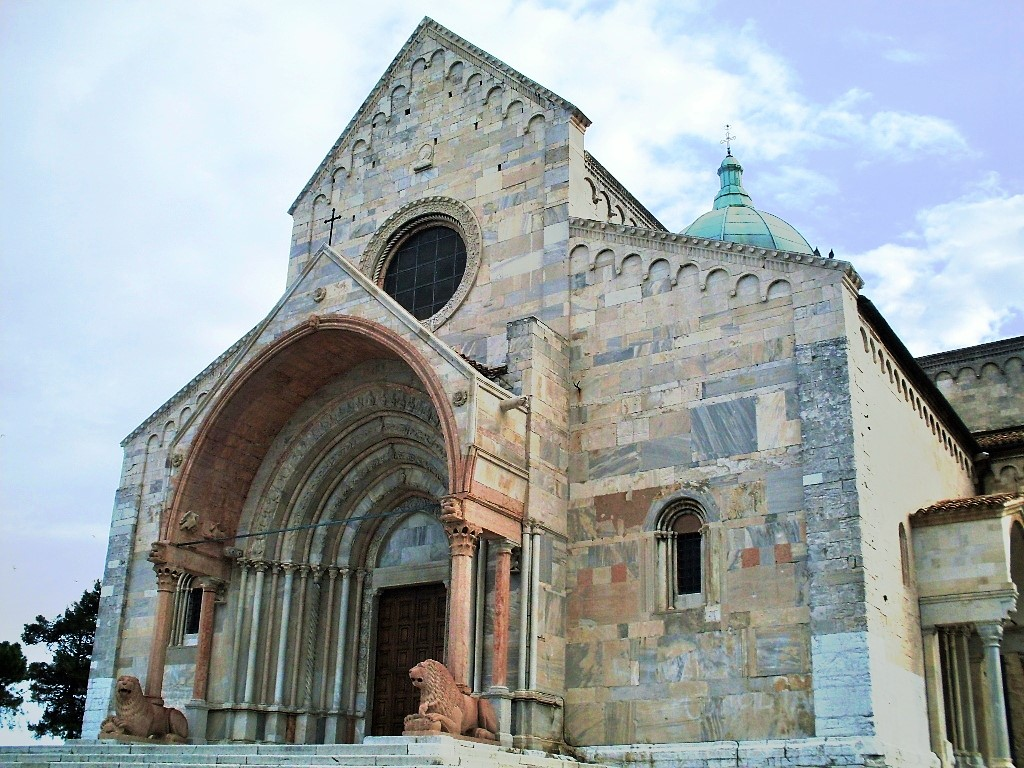
Main entrance

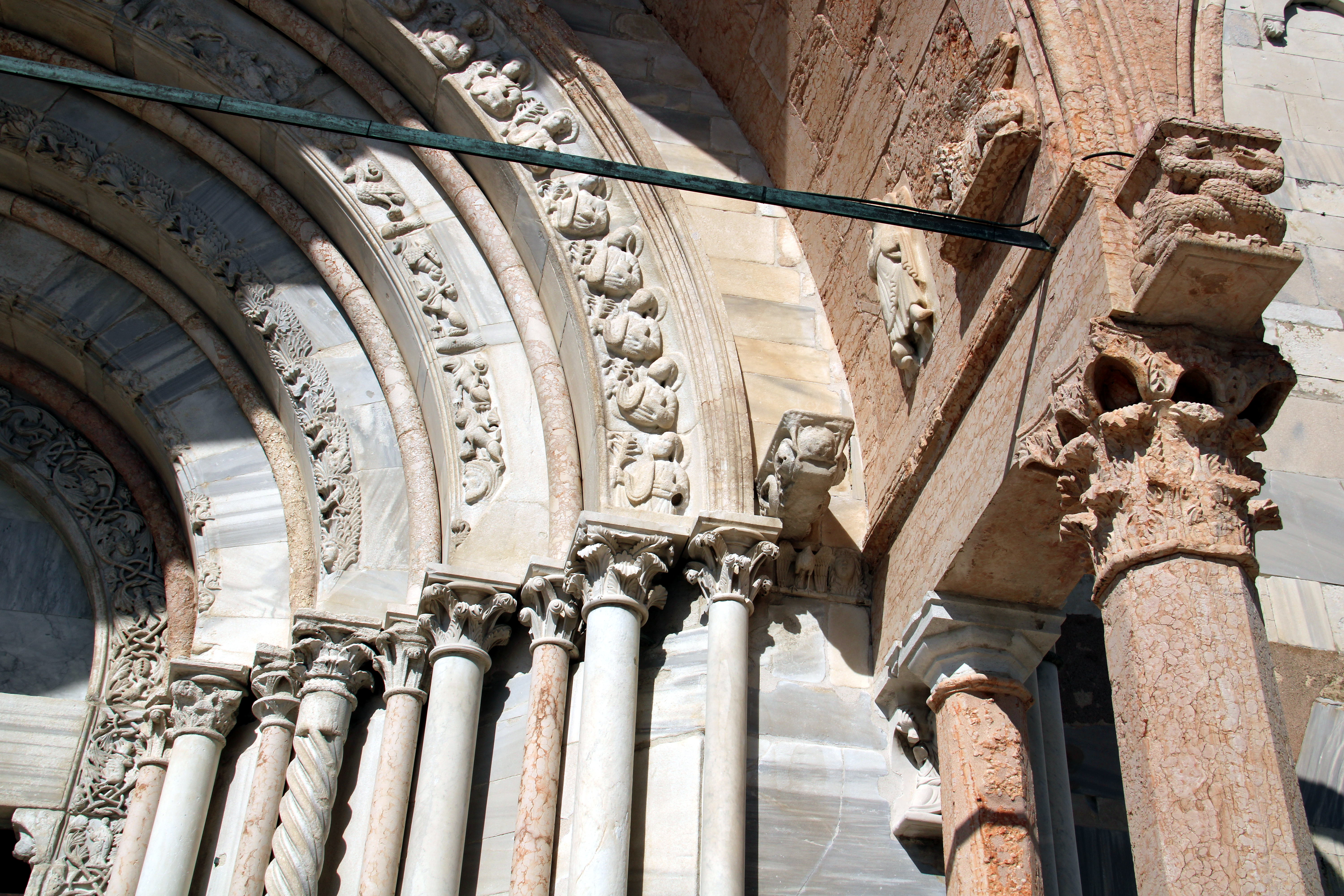
Main entrance

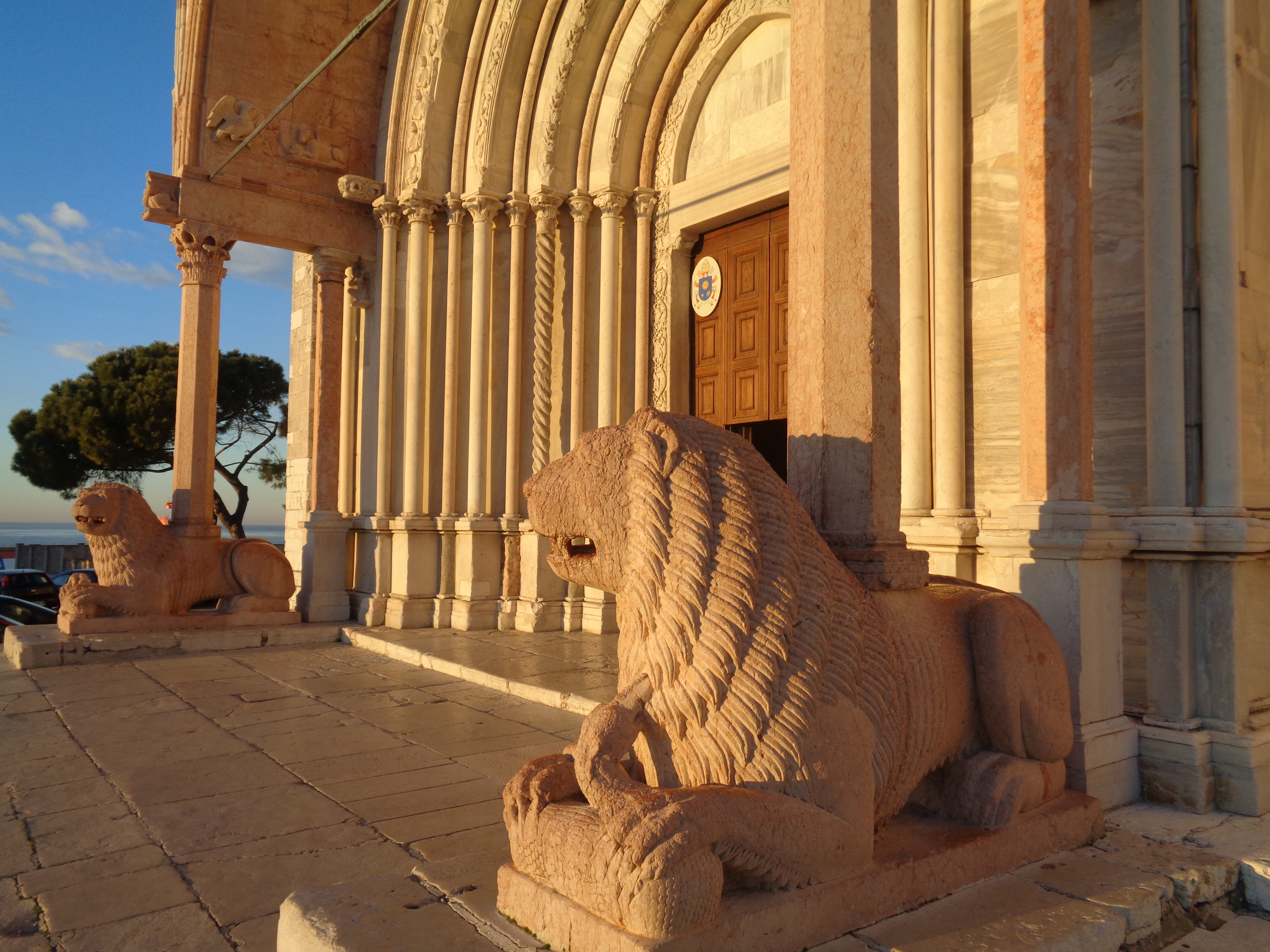
Both lions at the entrance

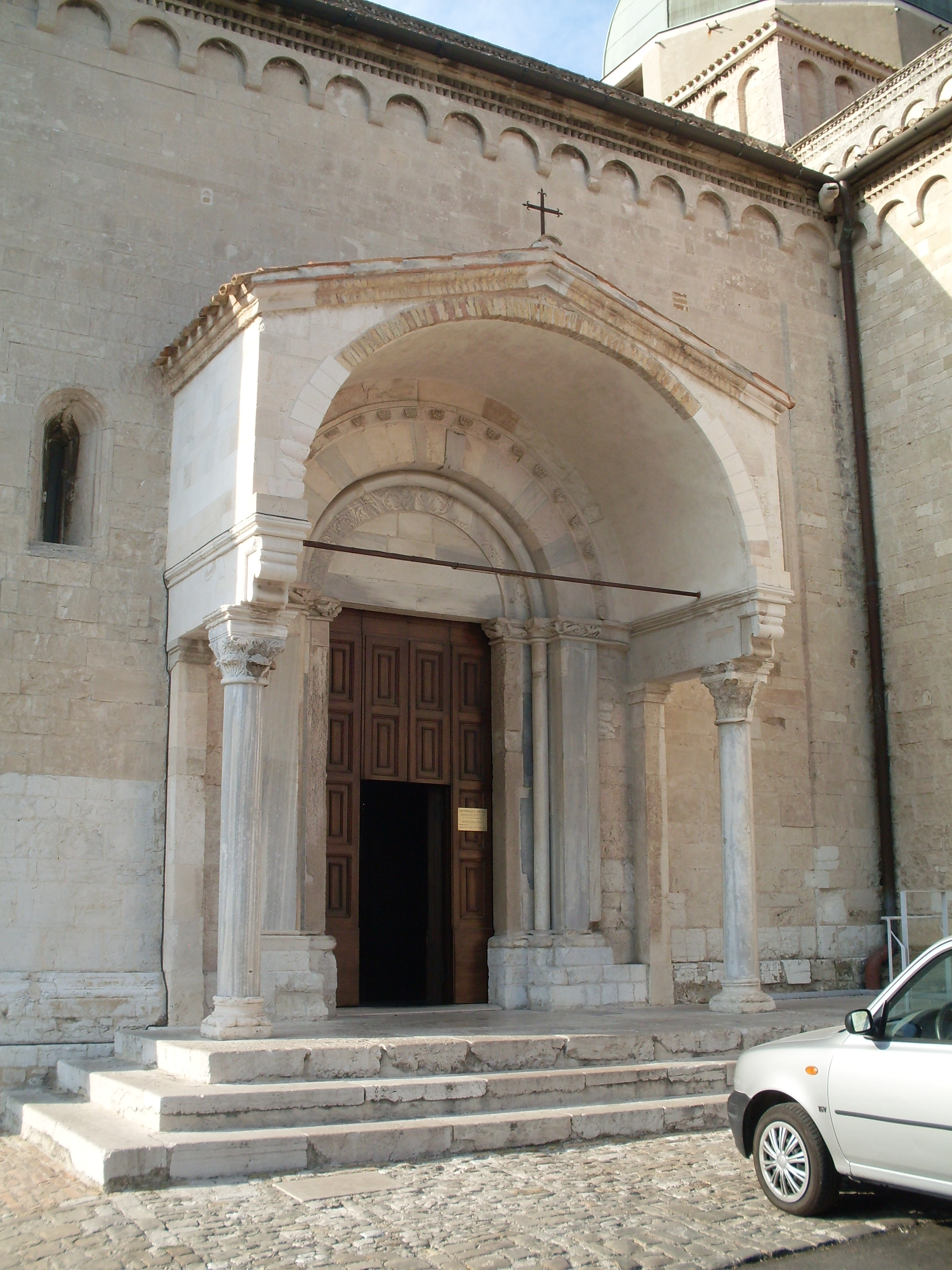
Side entrance

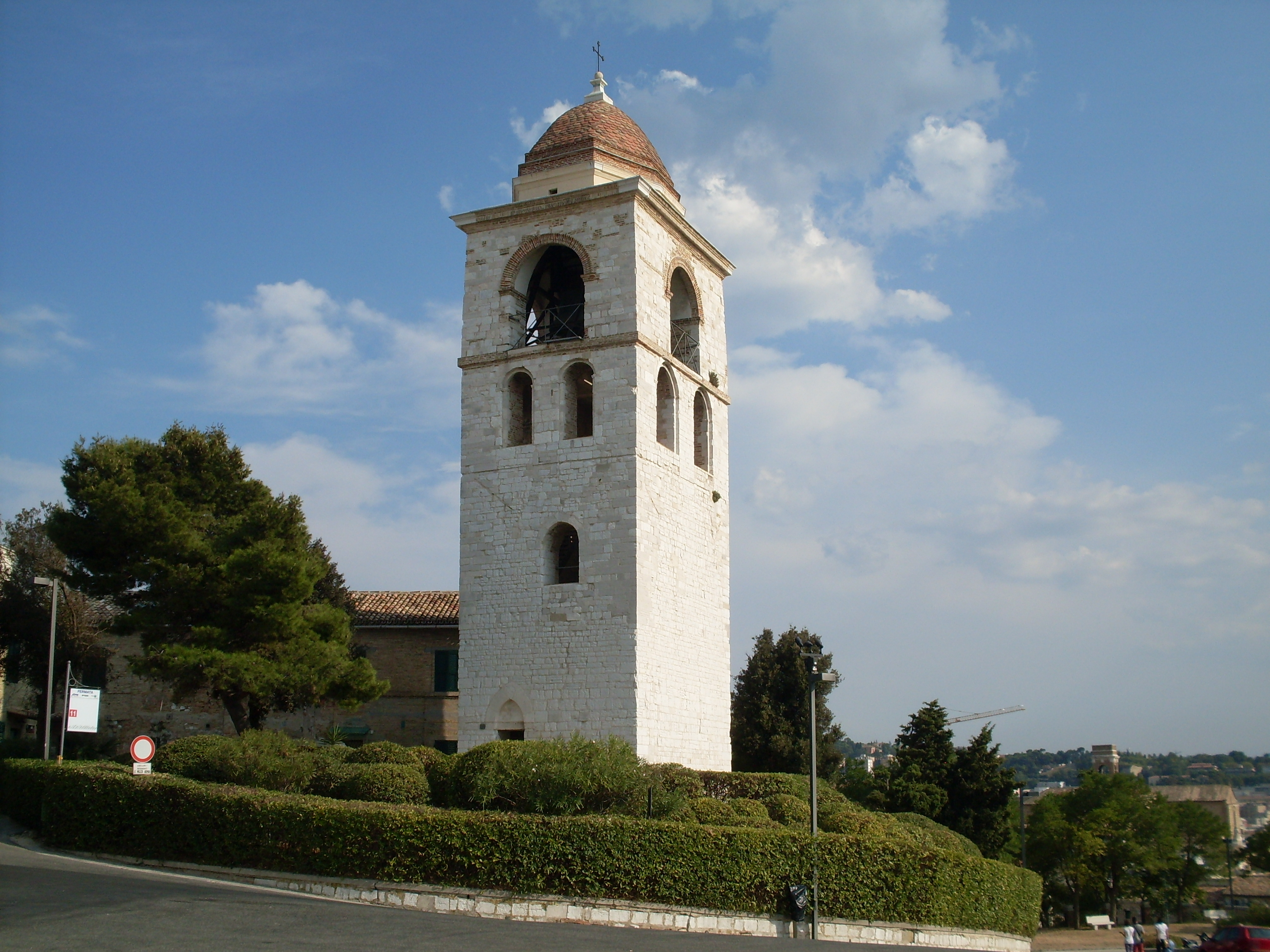
Campanile

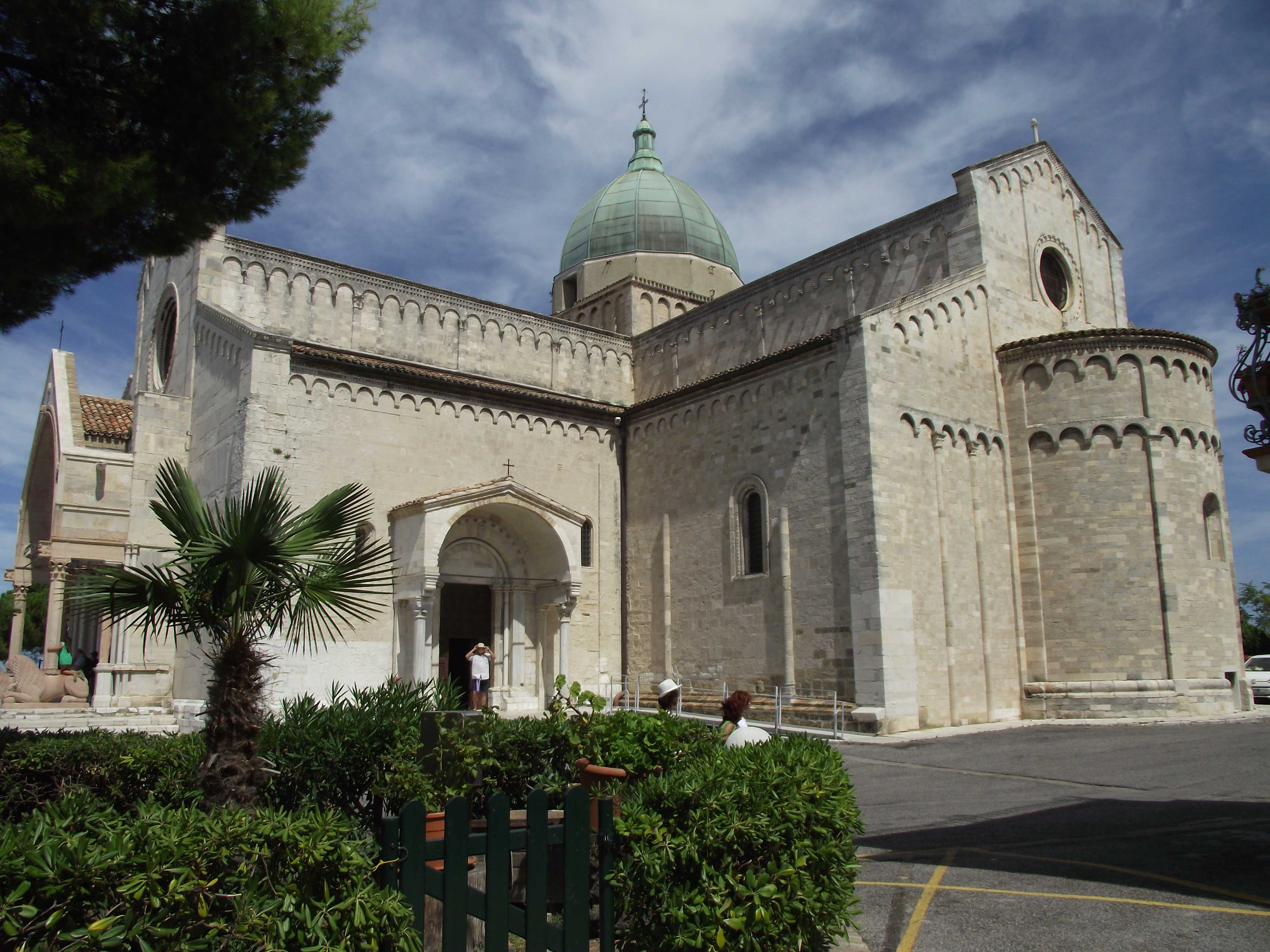
East end and dome

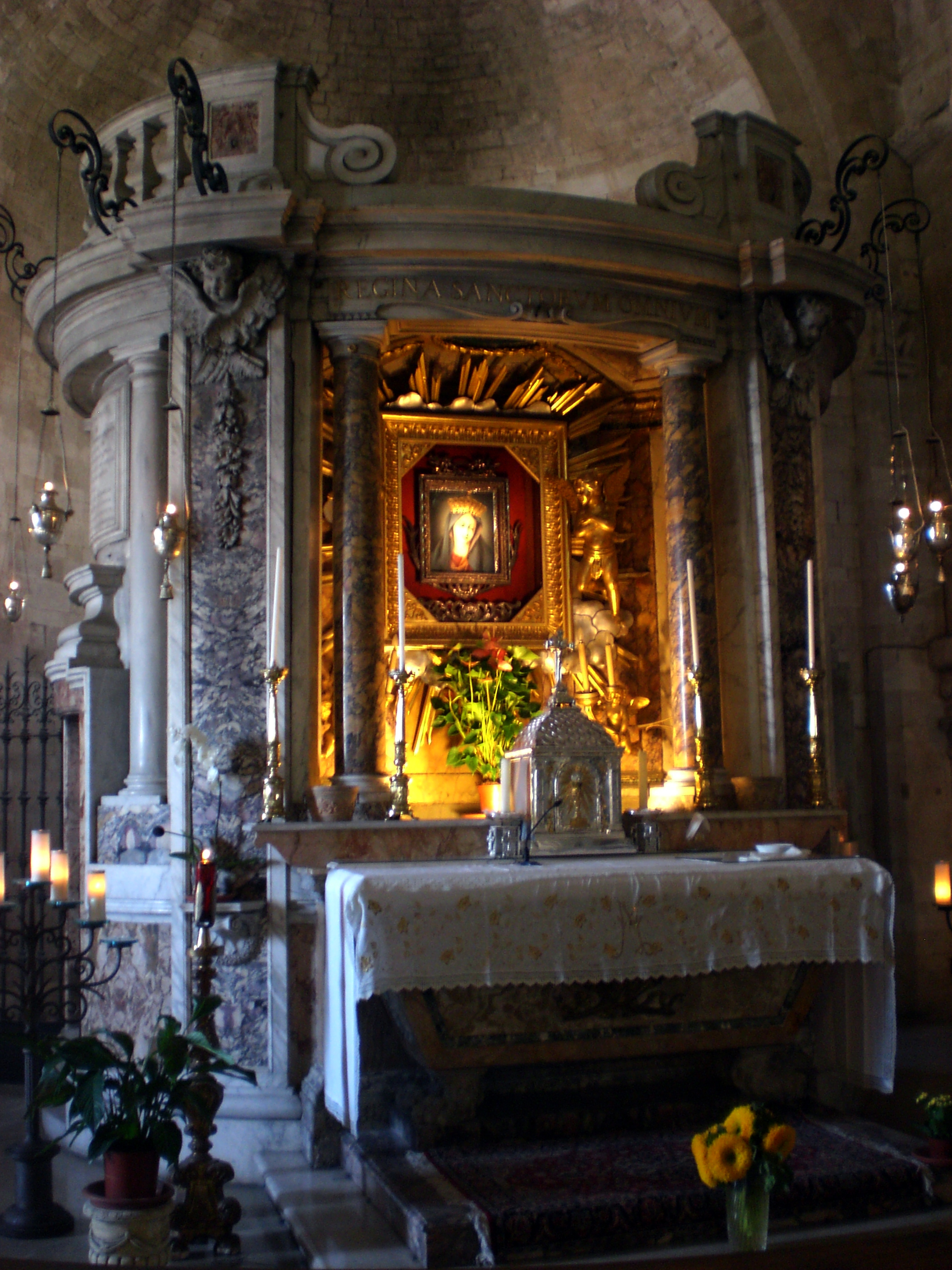
The pulpit by Luigi Vanvitelli with the painting of the Madonna Regina Sanctorum Omnium

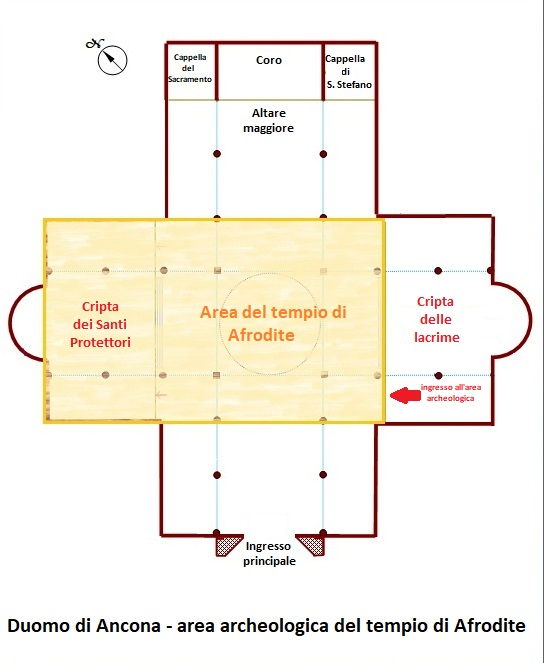
Map of the cathedral and the temple of Aphrodite

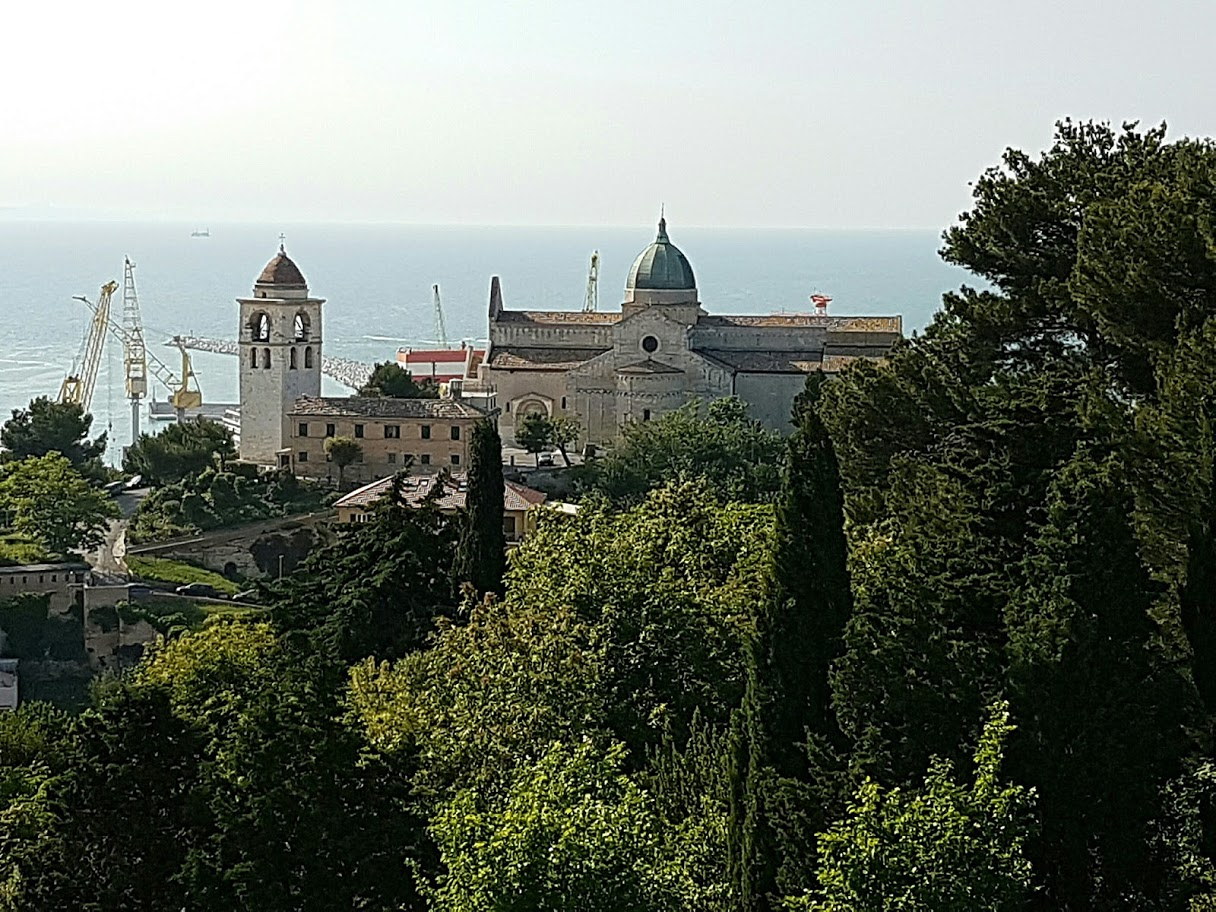
The Cathedral seen from Cardeto Park

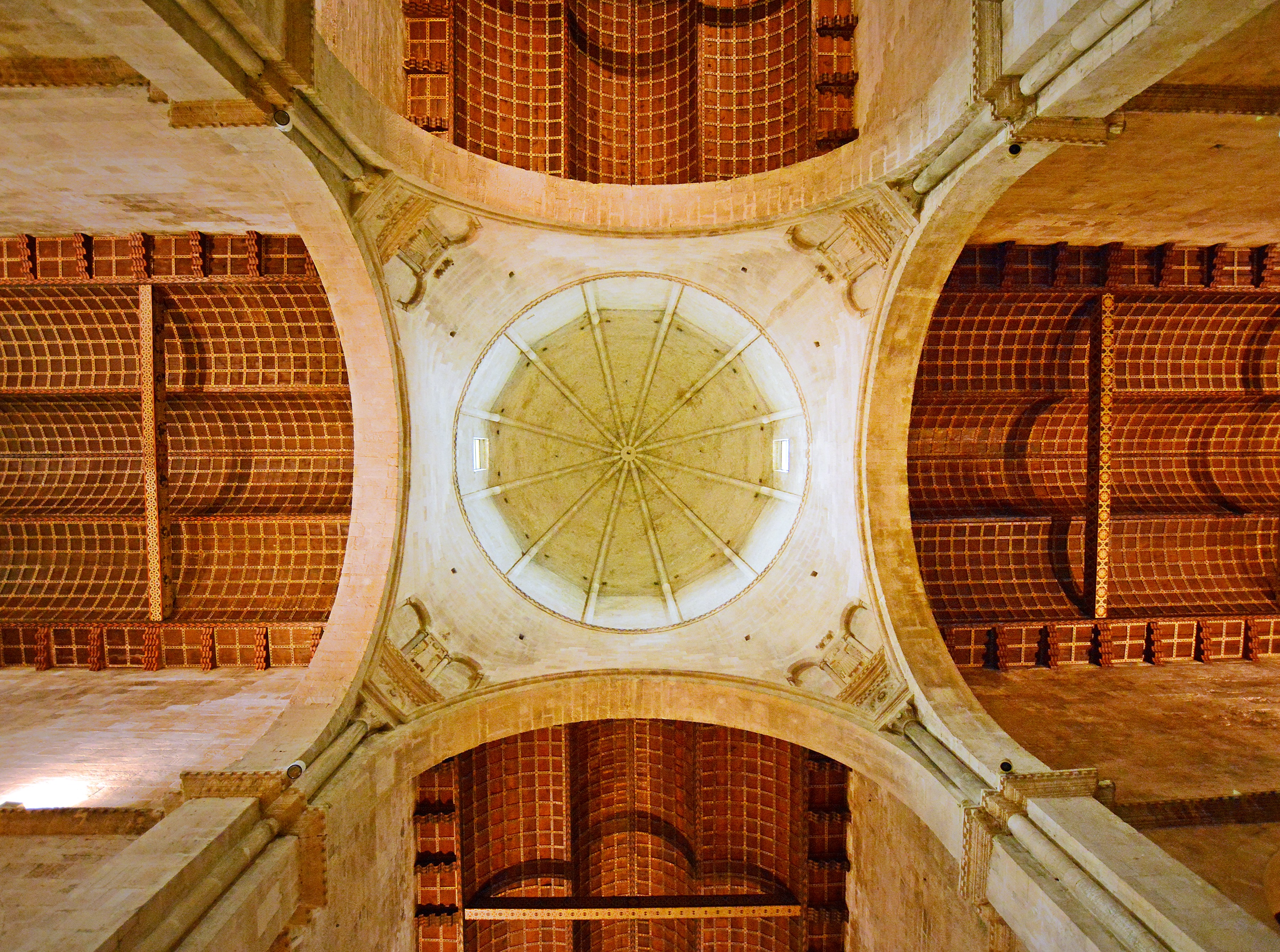
Interior of the dome and "ship's hull" ceilings

== Renaissance paintings representing the church ==
Vittore Carpaccio represented the Ancona Cathedral in his 1502 painting, St. George and the Dragon.; Giovanni Bellini represented the cathedral in Martyrdom of Saint Mark (1526, in collaboration with Lorenzo Lotto and Vittore Belliniano) and in Crucifixion (1530); Pinturicchio in Pius II arrives in Ancona (1502–1507). In the Vatican Gallery of Maps, Antonio Danti painted Ancona, its port and its cathedral seen from the sea (1580–1583).

== See also ==
- Roman Catholic Archdiocese of Ancona-Osimo
- High medieval domes
