= Bombing of Ancona in World War II =

Bombing of Ancona
- Part of World War II
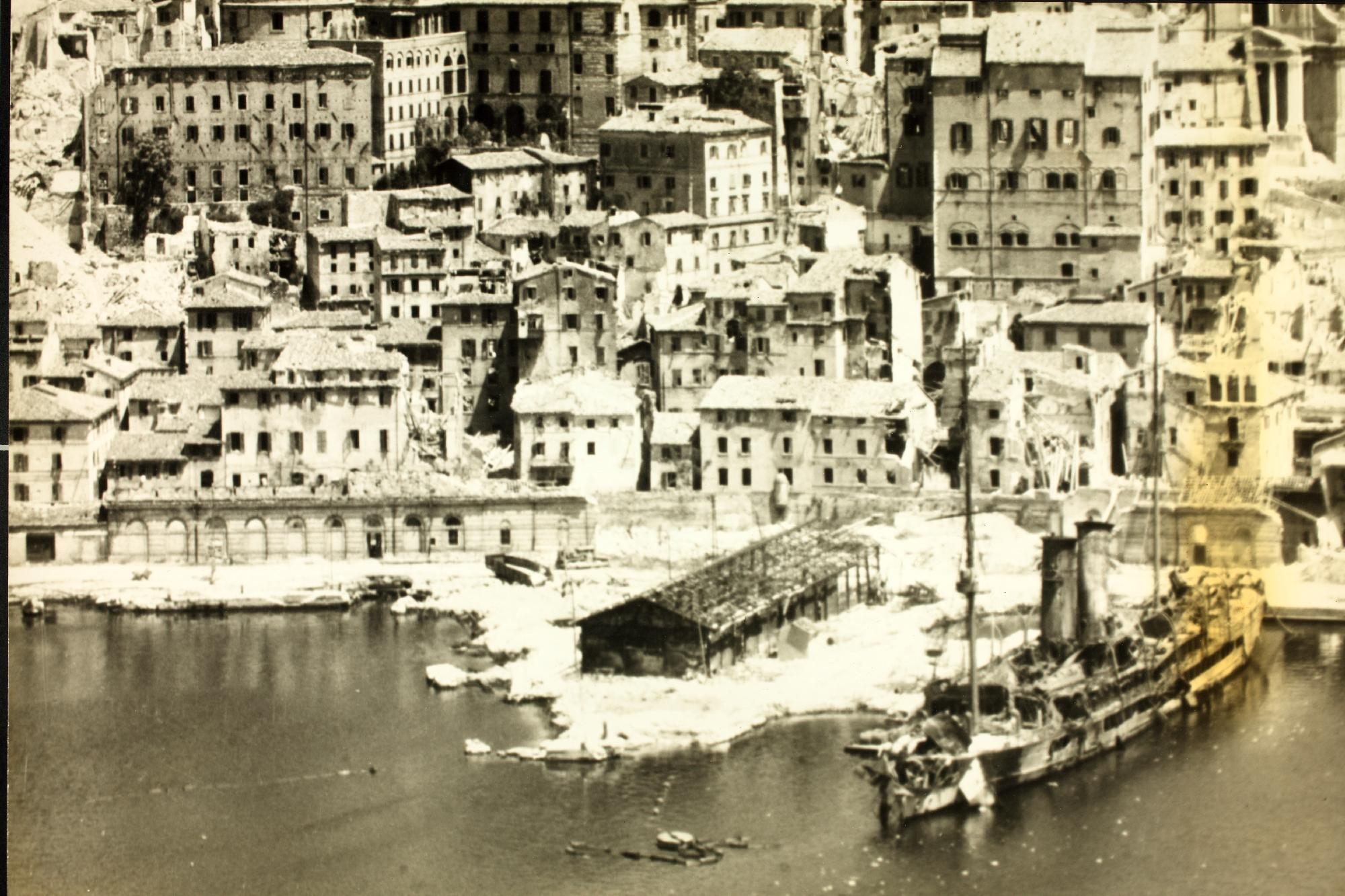
- Ancona in 1944
| Date | October 1943 – July 1944 |
| Location | Ancona, Italy |

Belligerents
| United States | Kingdom of Italy; Italian Social Republic |

The bombing of Ancona was a series of attacks by the United States Air Force on the city of Ancona in the Marche, Italy during World War II. The raids caused heavy civilian casualties and destroyed or damaged nearly 70 % of the city.

== History ==
From June 1940 to September 1943, when Italy was part of the Axis, Ancona was never bombed, being outside the range of both British bombers based in the United Kingdom and American bombers based in North Africa. On 15 September 1943, after the Armistice of Cassibile, German troops occupied Ancona during Operation Achse; at the same time, the Allied advance into southern Italy resulted in the city being now within the range of the Allied air forces.

The first air raid on Ancona took place on 16 October 1943, a month after its occupation; 36 bombers of the Twelfth Air Force targeted its marshalling yard, but many bombs also fell over the rest of the city, causing 200 civilian casualties.

The second raid took place on 1 November 1943, and was by far the deadliest raid suffered by Ancona; seventy-eight North American B-25 Mitchell bombers of the 12th Air Force, in two waves (at 12:16 and 12:55), dropped their bombs on the marshalling yard and the shipyard, but a large part of the bombs ended up hitting the city, killing between 875 (official toll) and 1,500 civilians. 724 people were killed when an air raid shelter was hit by four bombs and partially collapsed. The Cathedral, among other buildings, suffered serious damage, as did the Loggia dei Mercanti. The incomplete Capitani Romani-class cruiser Ottaviano Augusto and the royal yacht Savoia, both in German hands, were sunk in the harbour.

After this raid, most of the population abandoned the city. More air raids took place on 2, 7 and 27 November and 8 December 1943; the raids on 7 November and 8 December caused 22 and 42 victims, respectively. A further thirteen air raids, usually targeting the marshalling yard, took place in 1944; these raids further destroyed the city but caused few casualties, as only 4,000 of the pre-war population of 80,000 were still living in Ancona, the rest having fled to neighbouring towns and villages. Including minor attacks, Ancona suffered over 130 air raids.

On 18 July 1944 Ancona was liberated by the Allies, bringing the raids to an end. By this time, 2,783 buildings had been destroyed and 6,381 badly damaged; 67 % of pre-war Ancona lay in ruins, and less than 30 % of all buildings were left undamaged. The old city centre, stretched around the port (which was the objective of several raids), was almost completely annihilated. Civilian deaths from the air raids, depending on the source, were between 1,182 and 2,782; over 30,000 people were left homeless. It took nearly fifteen years to restore the situation to normality.
