= Loggia dei Mercanti =

Palace in Ancona, Marche region of Italy

Coordinates: 43°37′11″N 13°30′35″E

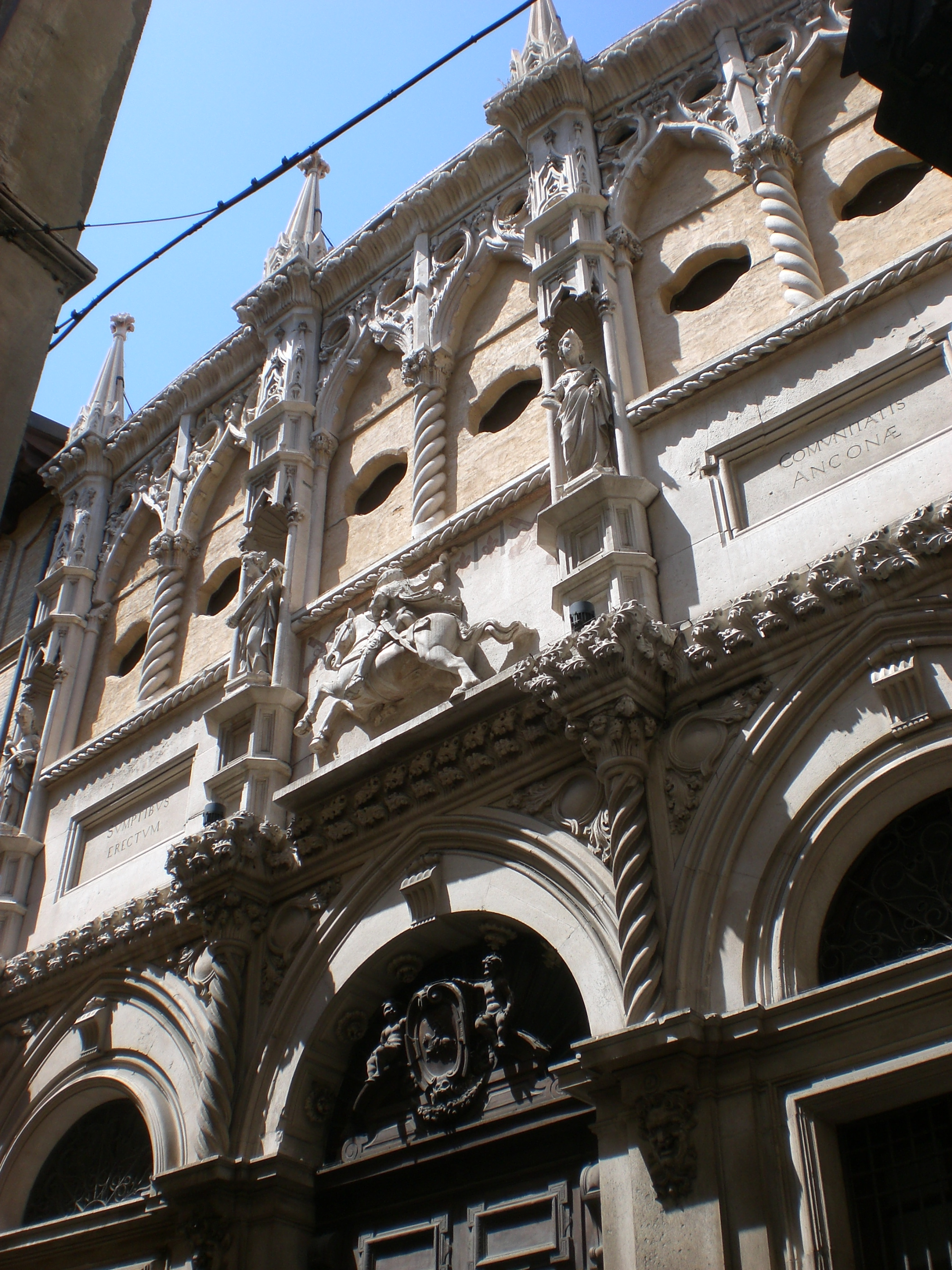
Loggia dei Mercanti.

The Loggia dei Mercanti ("Merchants' Lodge") is a historical palace in Ancona, central Italy.

The construction of the palace commenced in 1442 under the direction of architect Giovanni Pace, also known as Sodo, during a period of economic prosperity for Ancona. Situated near the port, which served as the trade hub of the mercantile republic during medieval times, the palace was intended to serve as a gathering place for traders. The building was restored in 1558–1561 after a fire, under the direction of Pellegrino Tibaldi, who also frescoed the central hall.

The current façade was designed by the Dalmatian architect Giorgio da Sebenico, who worked to it in 1451 to 1459. It is divided into four vertical sections, topped by a pinnacle. Each one has a statue, representing (from left), Hope, Fortitude, Justice and Charity. The two side sections have two stained glass, ogival windows. In the upper sectors are blind double mullioned windows and, in the centre, is an equestrian statue of the Roman emperor Trajan.

The Loggia was damaged by the Allied bombings during World War II, and was restored in the late 20th century.

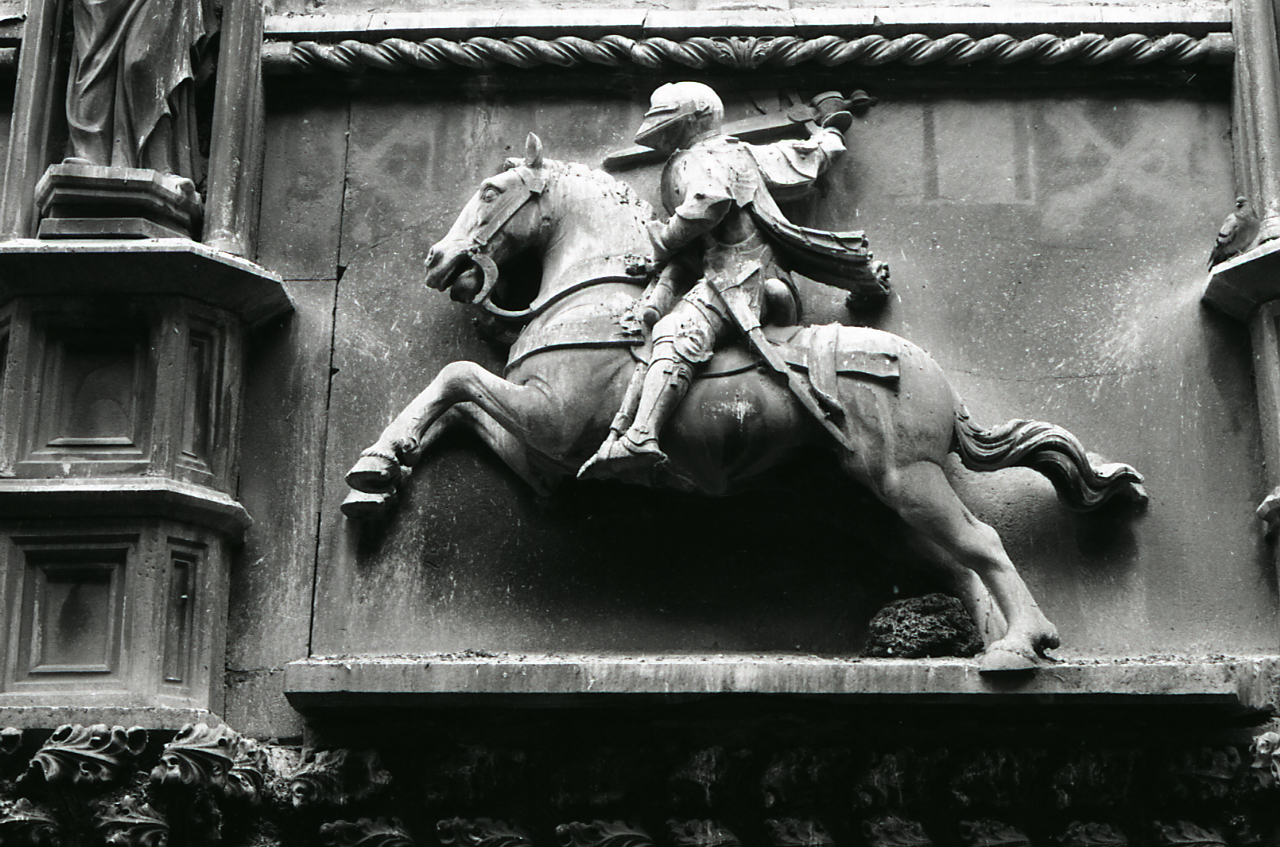
The statue of the civic coat of arms placed above the entrance, in a 1960s photo by Paolo Monti taken from the building in front of the Loggia.

== Sources ==
- Mariano, Fabio (2003). La Loggia dei Mercanti in Ancona e l'opera di Giorgio di Matteo da Sebenico. Ancona: Il Lavoro Editoriale. ISBN 88-7663-346-4.
