= Giorgio da Sebenico =

Venetian sculptor and architect (c. 1410–1473)

- Juraj Dalmatinac
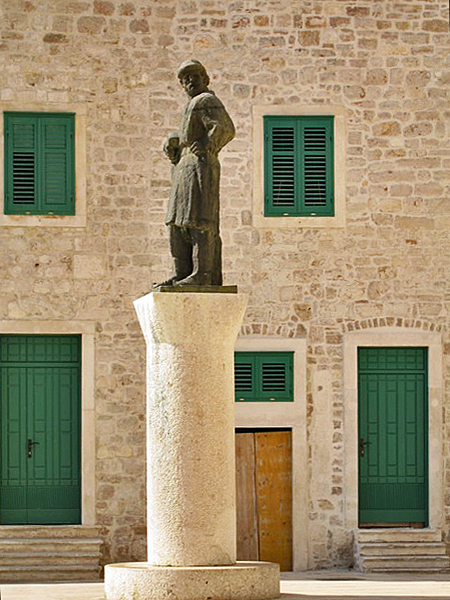
- A modern sculpture of the artist created by Ivan Meštrović, placed in front of the Šibenik Cathedral
- Born: circa 1410; Zadar, Republic of Venice (now Croatia)
- Died: 10 October 1473; Šibenik, Republic of Venice (now Croatia)
- Known for: stone carving

Giorgio da Sebenico (lit. 'George of Sebenico') or Giorgio Orsini or Juraj Dalmatinac (lit. 'George the Dalmatian'; c. 1410 – 10 October 1473) was a Venetian sculptor and architect from Dalmatia, who worked mainly in Šibenik, and in the city of Ancona, then a maritime republic.

== Life ==
Giorgio da Sebenico was born to the Roman noble Orsini family in the Dalmatian city of Zara (now Zadar, Croatia), which was part of the Republic of Venice (see Venetian Dalmatia).

He emigrated to Venice during his youth, where he was probably trained as a sculptor in the workshop of Giovanni and Bartolomeo Bon, or at least worked with them as an independent associate. He would not have been awarded the great responsibility of the 1441 Šibenik contract without having experience of major works, and various attributions of surviving sculptures in Venice to him, as part of the Bon workshop, have been made, including the decorations on the Porta della Carta of the Doge's Palace. Anne Markham Schultz dismisses all previous suggestions as stylistically incompatible, but instead proposes the relief of Saint Mark enthroned among members of the Confraternity of Saint Mark in the lunette above the main entrance to the Scuola di San Marco, which she dates to 1437-1438 and finds close in style to Giorgio's later works at Šibenik and elsewhere. As his style here has few similarities to other works by the Bons, she considers it most likely that he worked with them when already a master, who had trained elsewhere. She believes his personal style offers few clues as to where this might have been.

In 1441, when still resident in Venice, Giorgio was summoned to Šibenik in order to take charge of the construction of the Šibenik Cathedral of St James. He moved by the end of August, and in 1443 was awarded the title of master under the condition set in the contract with the procurators of the Cathedral to take up residence there for at least six years. On 1 September 1446, he agreed to extend his contract as chief architect for another ten years. Giorgio was granted permission to remain in Venice for two months every two years on condition that he did no work there except on his own house. He worked on the Cathedral from 1441 until 1473, although discontinuously because the work was interrupted several times for lack of funds and probably by a fire.

In Venice, he married Elisabetta Da Monte (daughter of Gregorio da Monte, a Venetian carpenter), who brought him as her dowry some houses in Venice. After 1450, he worked in both Ancona and Sebenico, with a period in Dubrovnik between June 1464 and November 1465, mostly working on the fortifications. He travelled to Rome in 1470–71. He is believed to have died in Sebenico on 10 October 1473.

It is believed that his descendants inhabited Sebenico until the end of the 17th century.

== Work ==
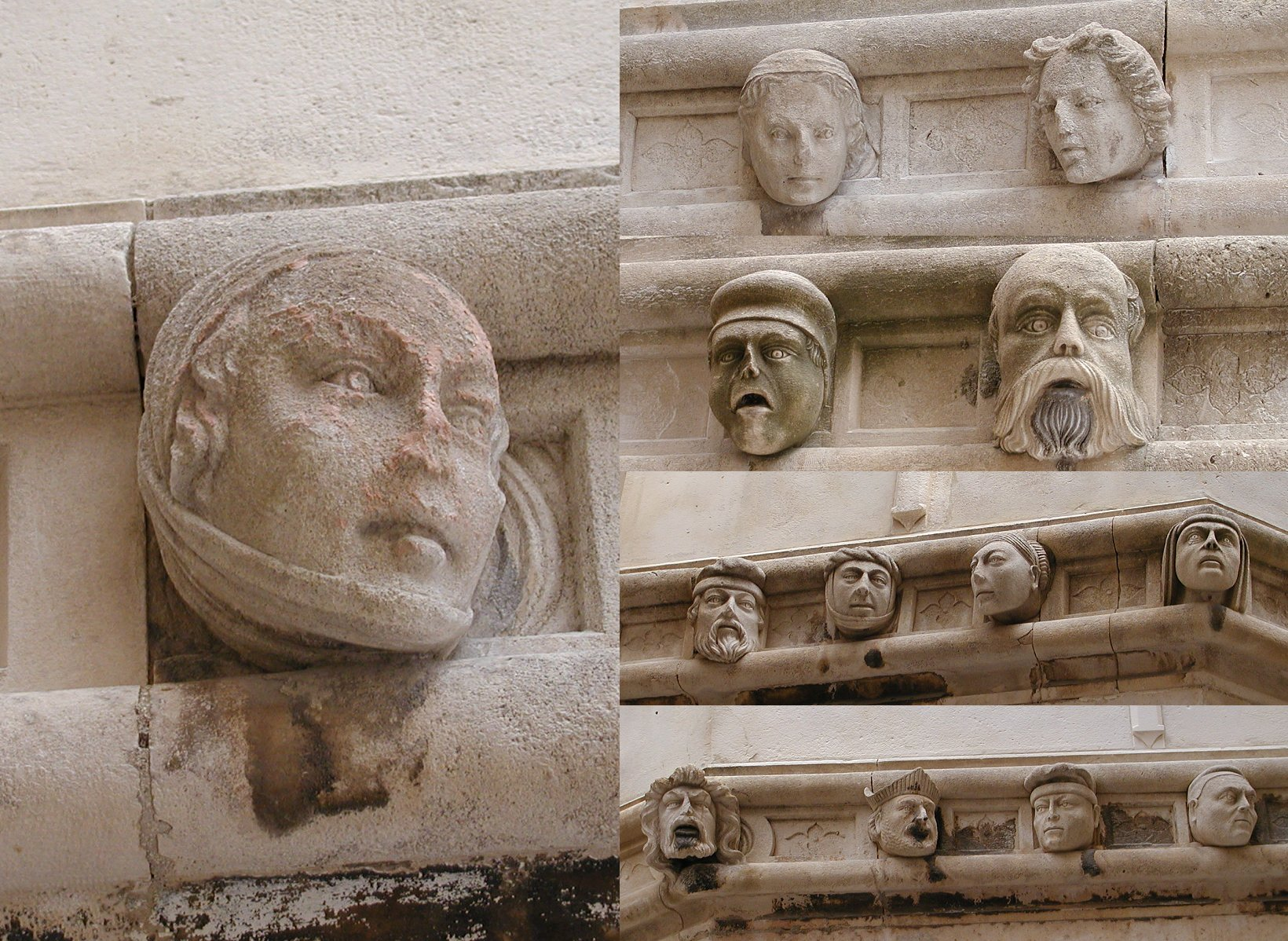
Facade of the Šibenik Cathedral of St James - the principal work of Giorgio da Sebenico

His work represents the golden age of Dalmatian medieval art. He was one of main artists of the Adriatic Renaissance, a tendency widespread during the late 15th century in Venice, Dalmatia and in some locations of the Italian Adriatic Coast, such as Ancona. According to Stanko Kokole, "Although his style was firmly based on the Venetian Late Gothic tradition, Giorgio was fascinated by the Florentine Renaissance, the influence of which is apparent in his figure sculptures." Influences and borrowings from many Florentine sculptors including Donatello, Ghiberti, Luca della Robbia, Niccolò Pizzolo, Antonio del Pollaiuolo, and Jacopo della Quercia can be detected in various works.

His most beautiful achievement remains the Šibenik Cathedral of St James, for which he was a chief architect from 1441 till 1473. The entire building was built solely of limestone from Istria, with no wood or bricks used in the structure. The building presents, all along the perimeter, a hedge composed of 72 stone-carved heads. On top of this hedge, and precisely on the North side, Giorgio added two angels; at the base of this work, the artist engraved his signature. The task before him was to build the choir, of which foundations had not been laid, to raise and roof the nave which was only completed to the top of the aisle vaults, and to cover the crossing by a lantern or cupola. Unfortunately, a lack of funding and a fire delayed the achievement of the construction. From 1 July 1477, the work on the Šibenik Cathedral of St James was continued by an architect from Tuscany, Niccolò di Giovanni Fiorentino.

In Split, he built several palaces. In 1448, he carved a stone altar in the Cathedral of Saint Domnius, with a remarkable representation of the flagellation of Christ. In Dubrovnik, he helped repair the Duke's Palace and helped build the Minčeta fortress in 1464 and 1465. He also distinguished himself as an urbanist. Around 1450, he made an urban plan for Pag and contributed to the project and construction of Pelješac walls. He was at the same time sculptor, architect and urban planner, showing in this his belonging to the cultural climate and orientation of the Renaissance.

In Italy, he worked in Ancona where he built the Loggia dei Mercanti, the portal of San Francesco alle Scale and the portal of Sant'Agostino. During his career Renaissance style gradually replaced the Gothic, in line with the European tendency during the 15th century for Gothic to become more elaborate and sophisticated, giving birth to the late Gothic style known in Venice as Gotico Fiorito and Flamboyant in France.

Among his disciples, the most known are Andrea Alessi and Radmillo Allegretti, whose works are in Cattaro and Zara.

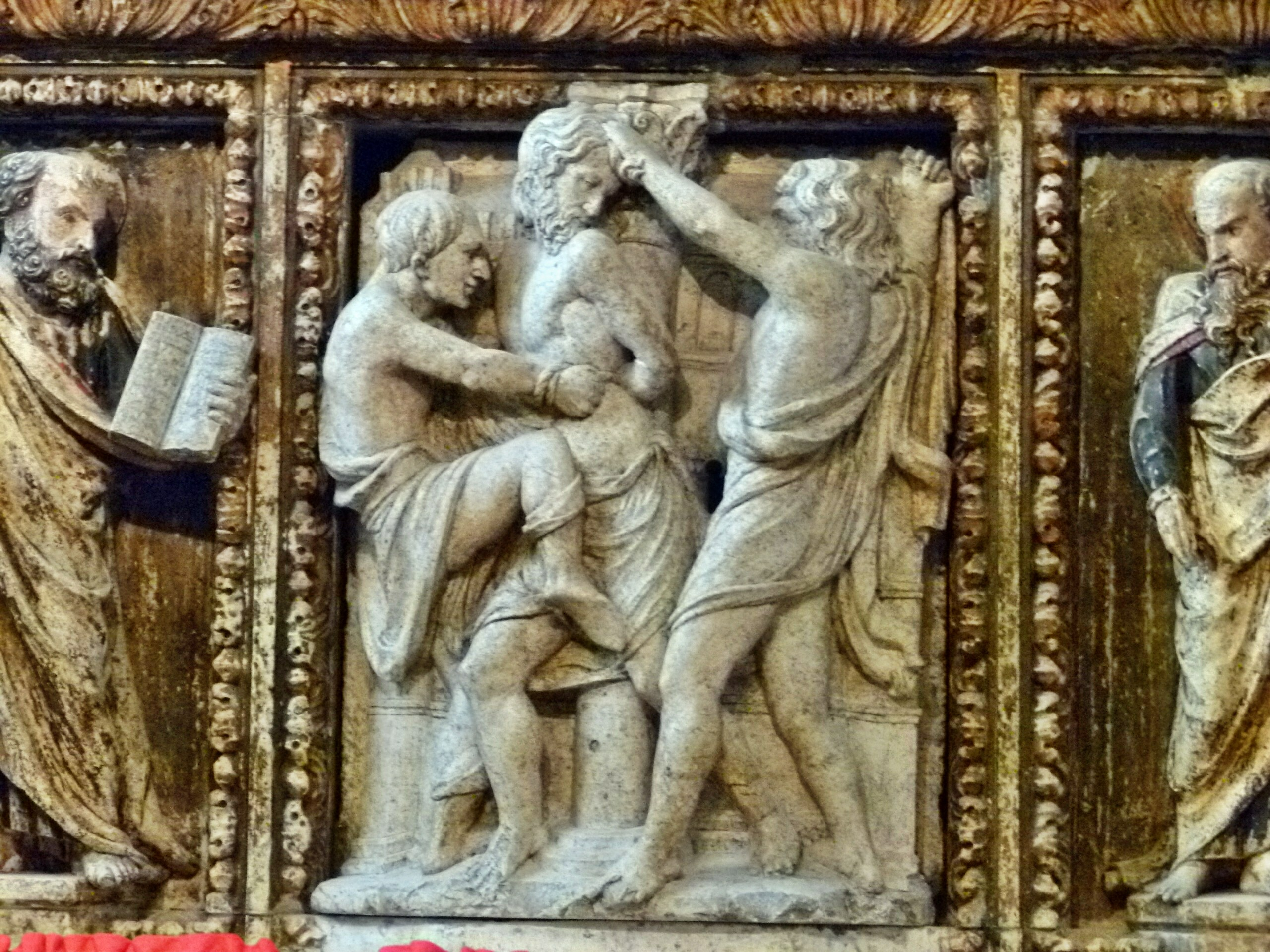
Altar detail in the Cathedral of Saint Domnius, Split

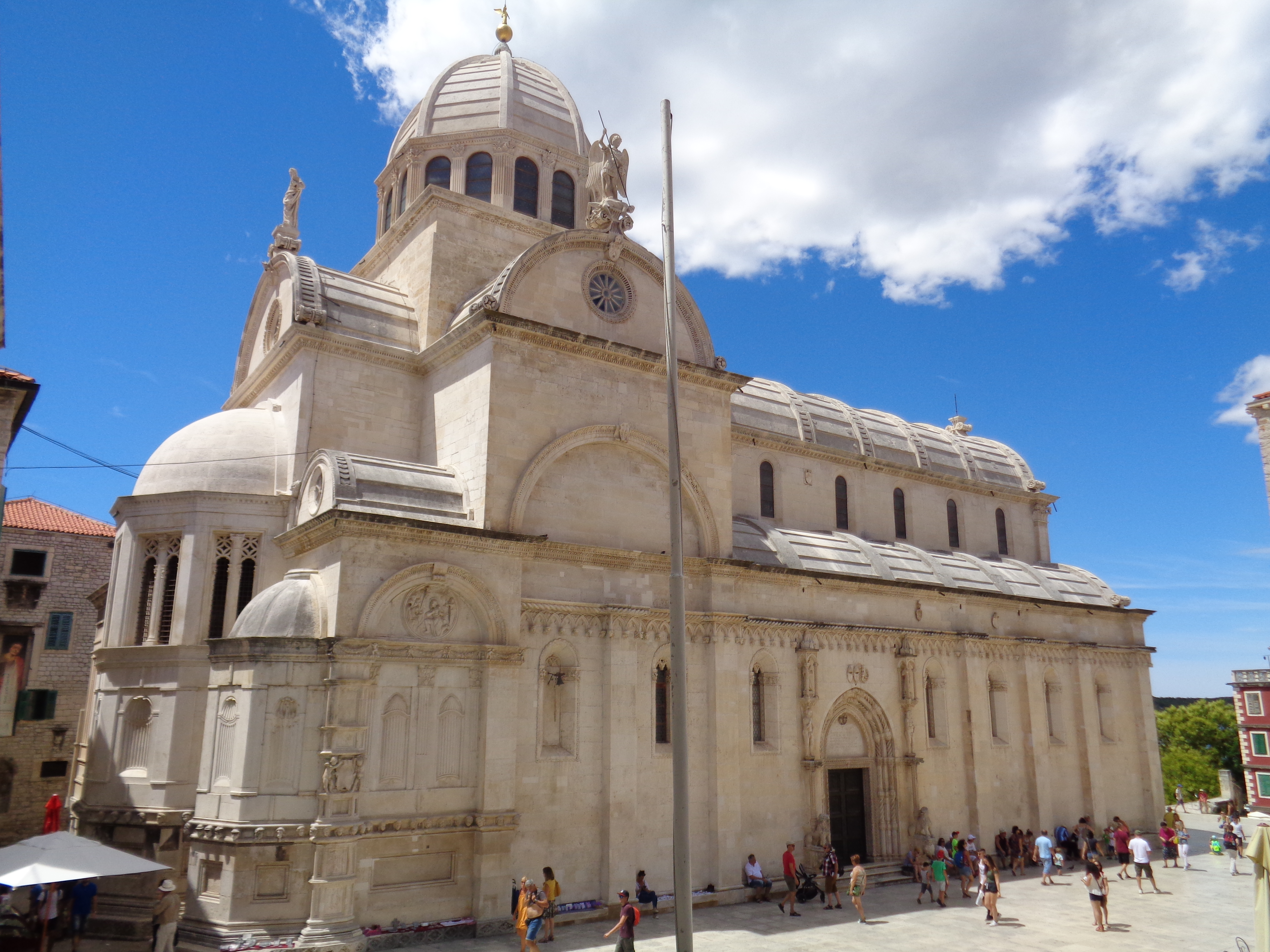
Šibenik Cathedral of St James

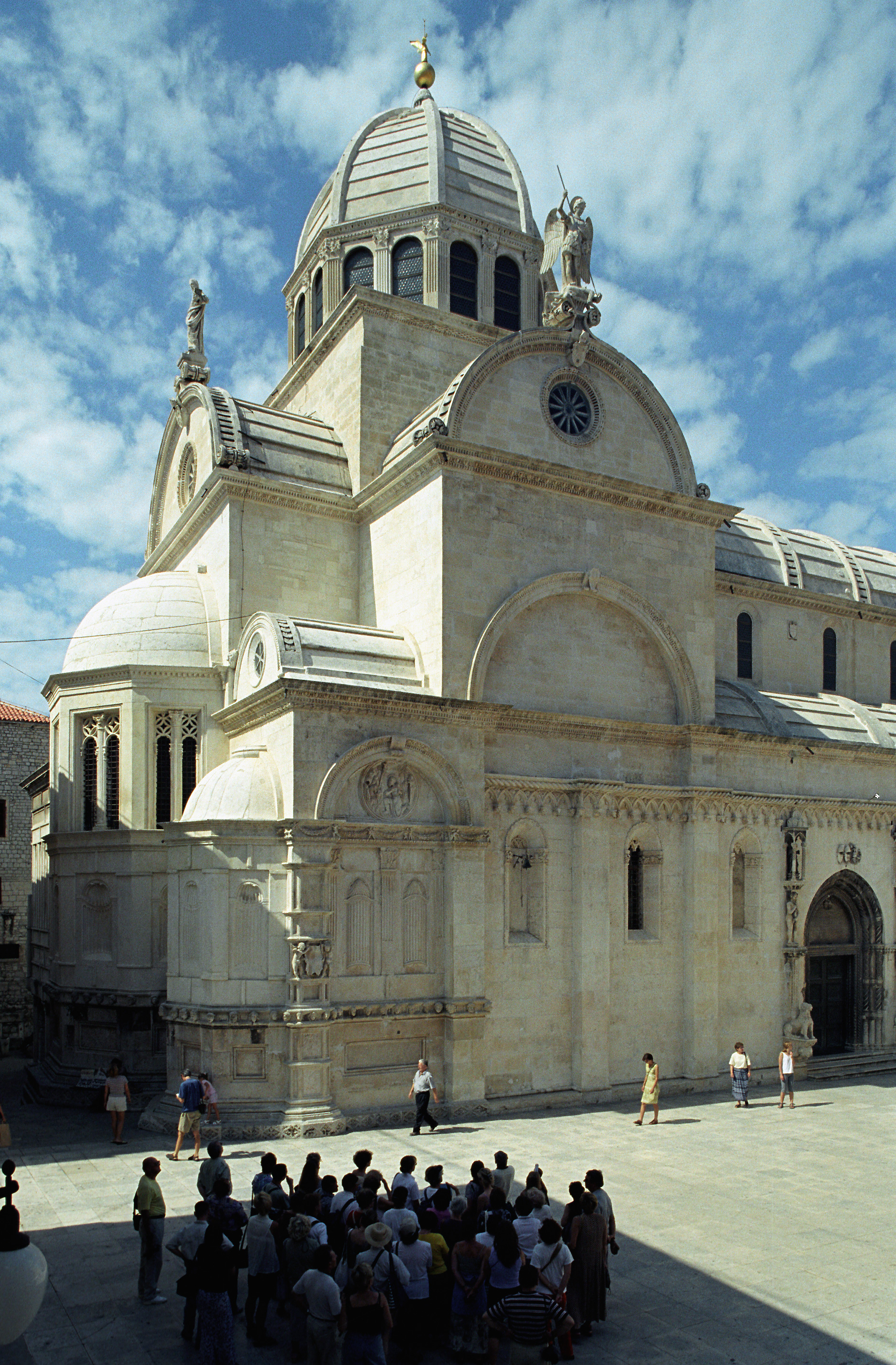
Šibenik Cathedral of St James

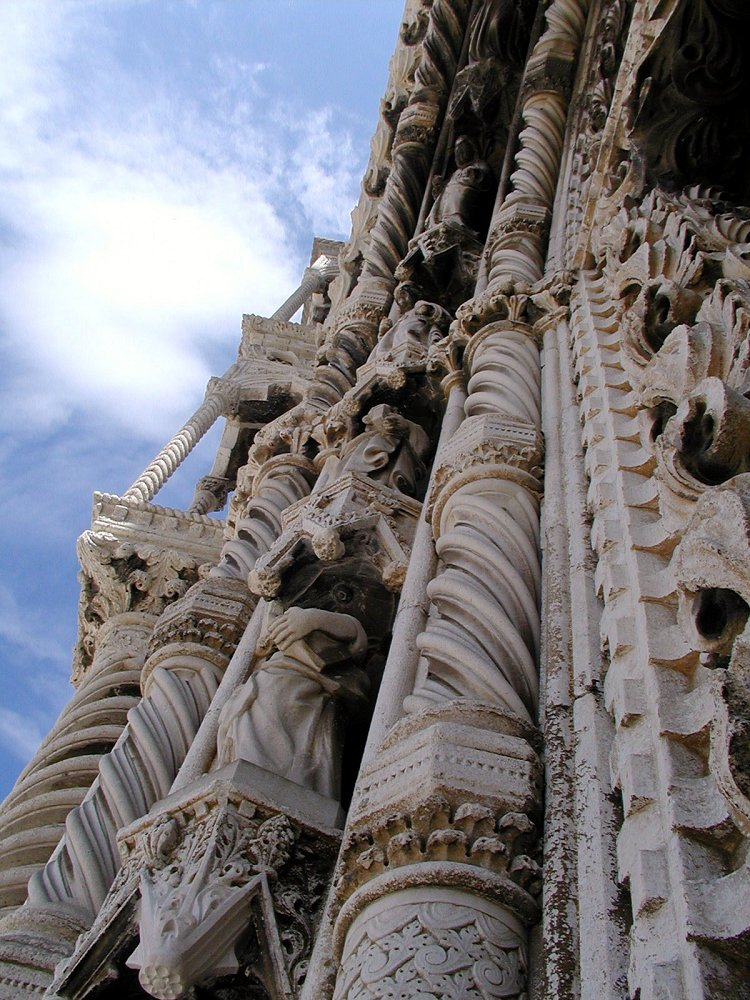
Šibenik Cathedral of St James

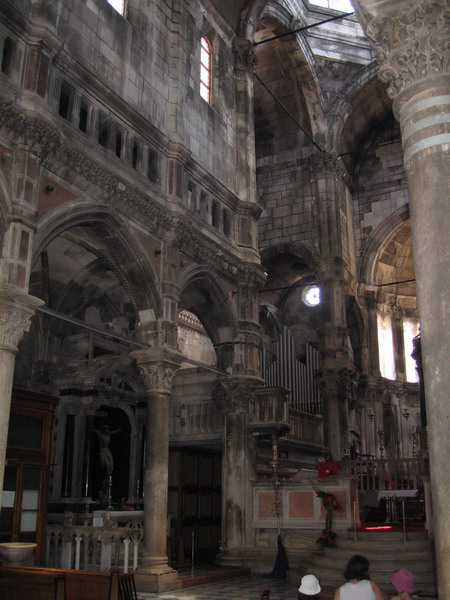
Cathedral of Šibenik (interior)

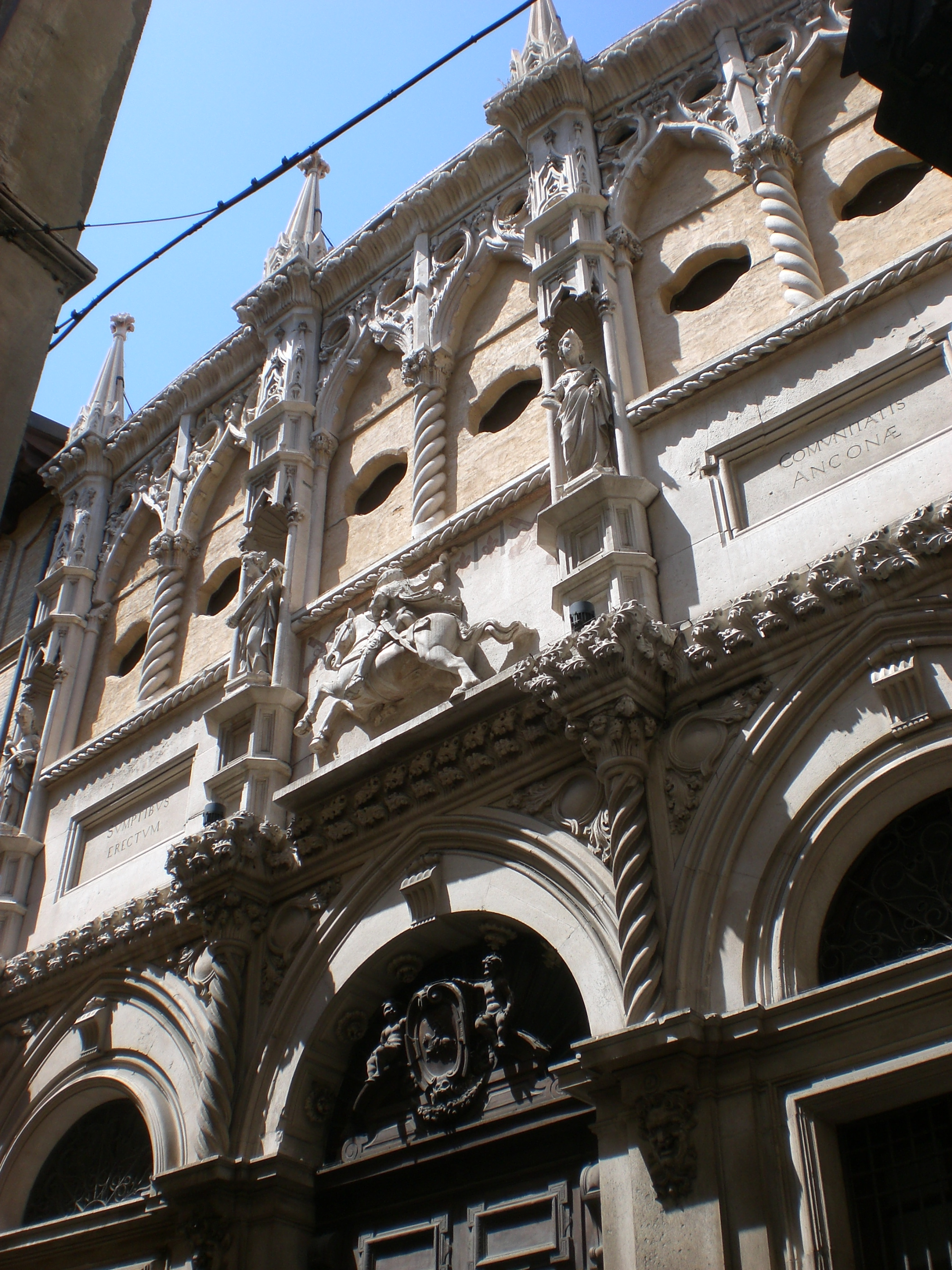
Loggia dei Mercanti, Ancona

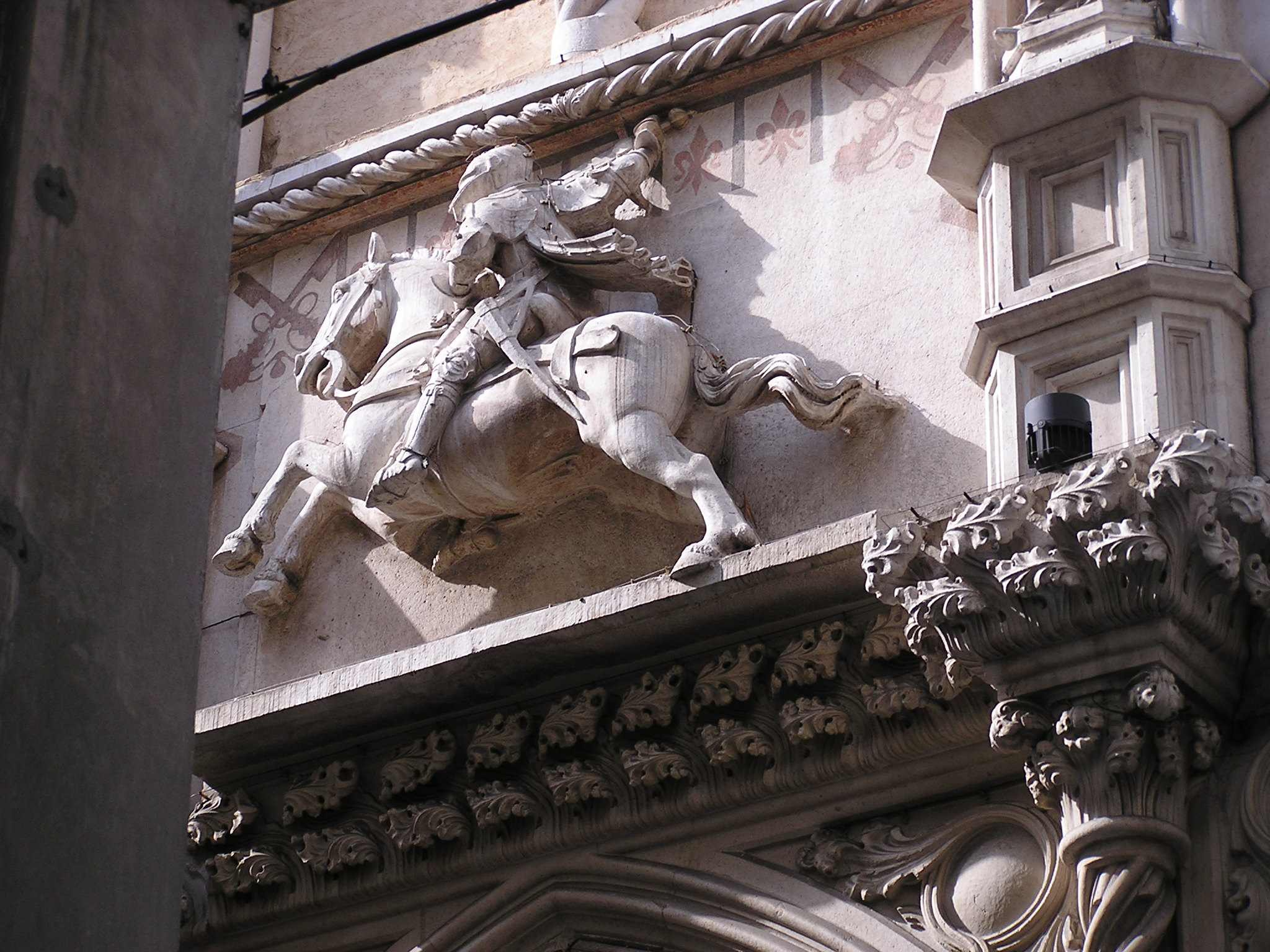
Coat of arms of Ancona, Loggia dei Mercanti, Ancona

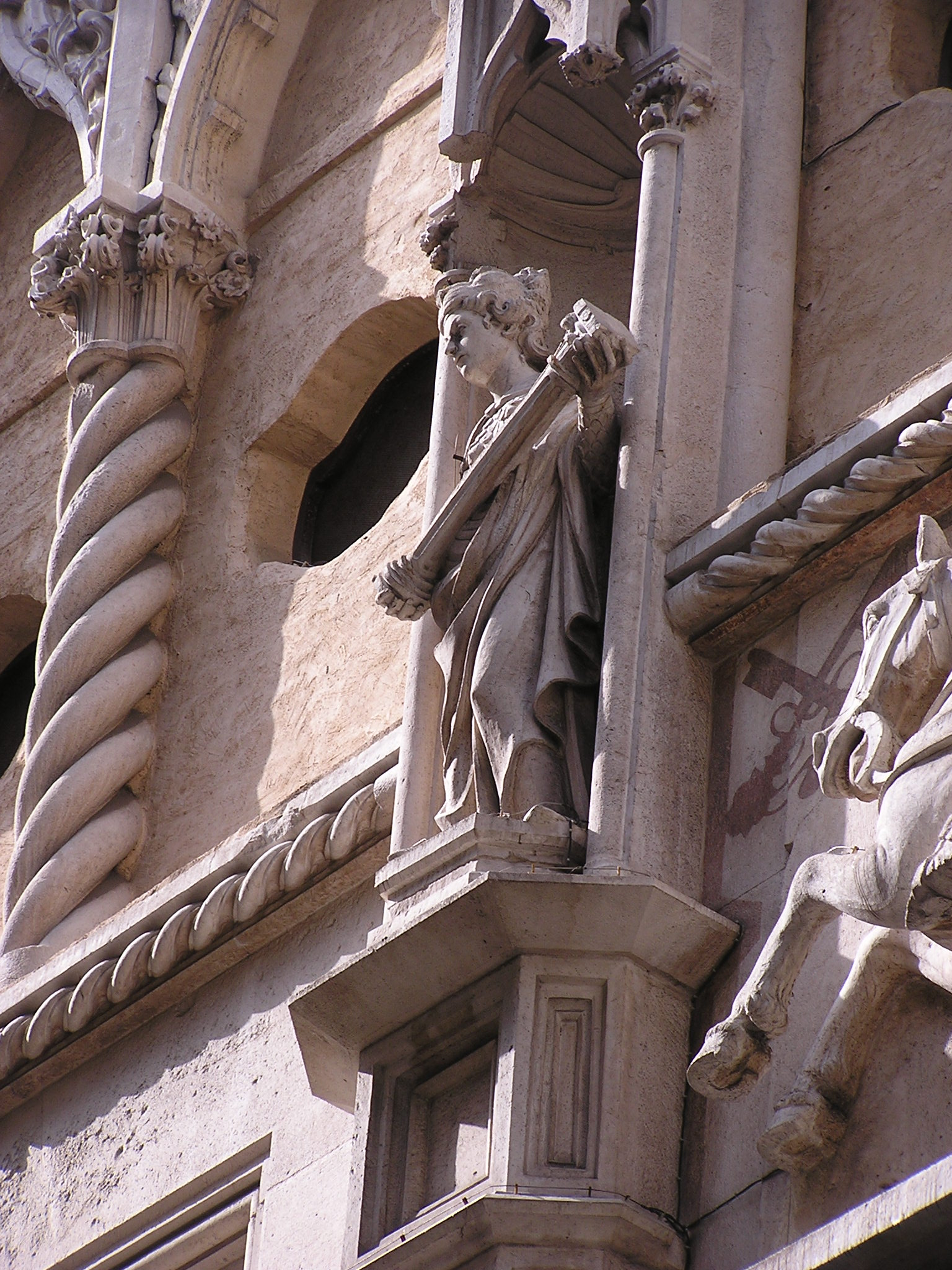
Loggia dei Mercanti, Ancona

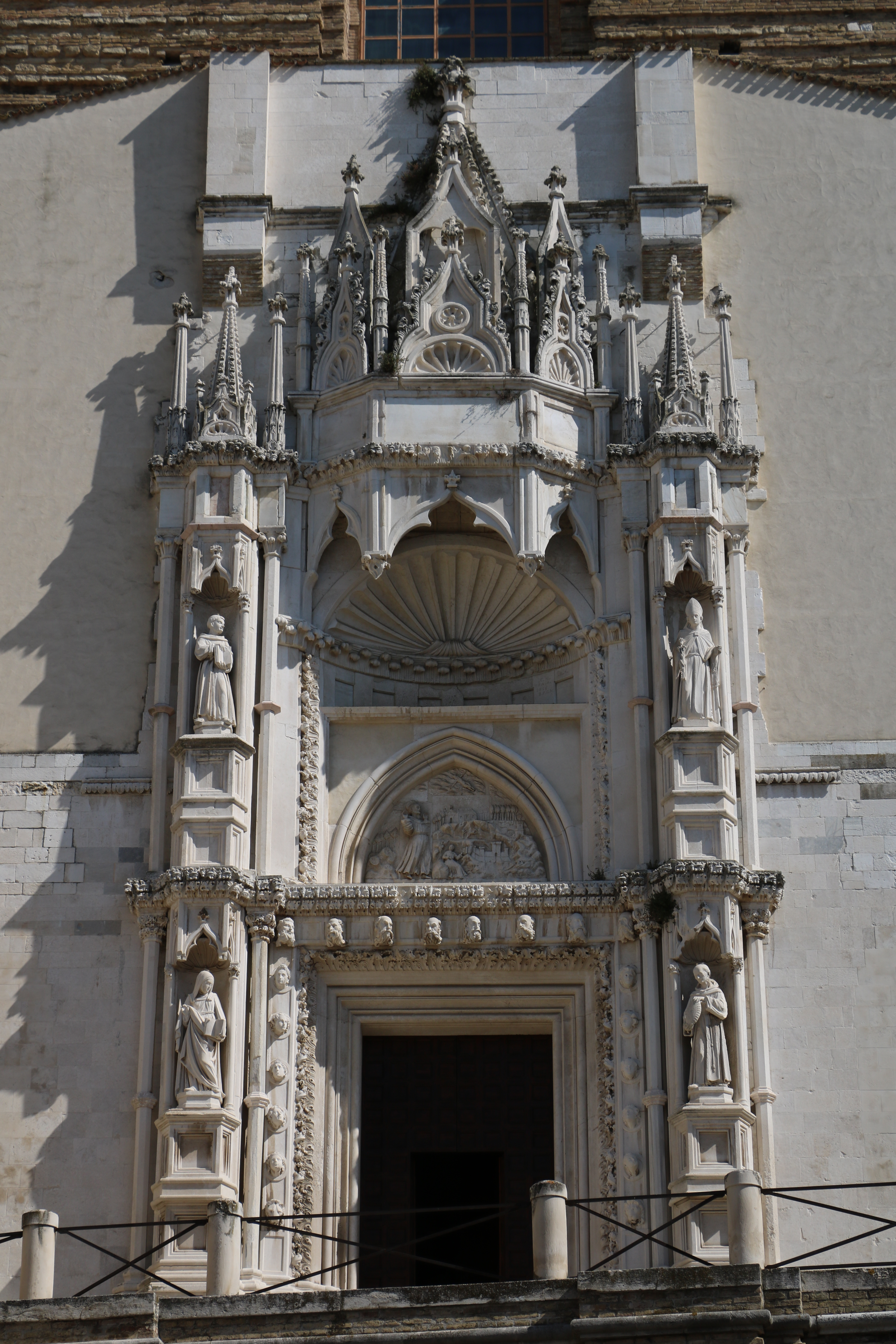
Church of San Francesco alle Scale, Ancona

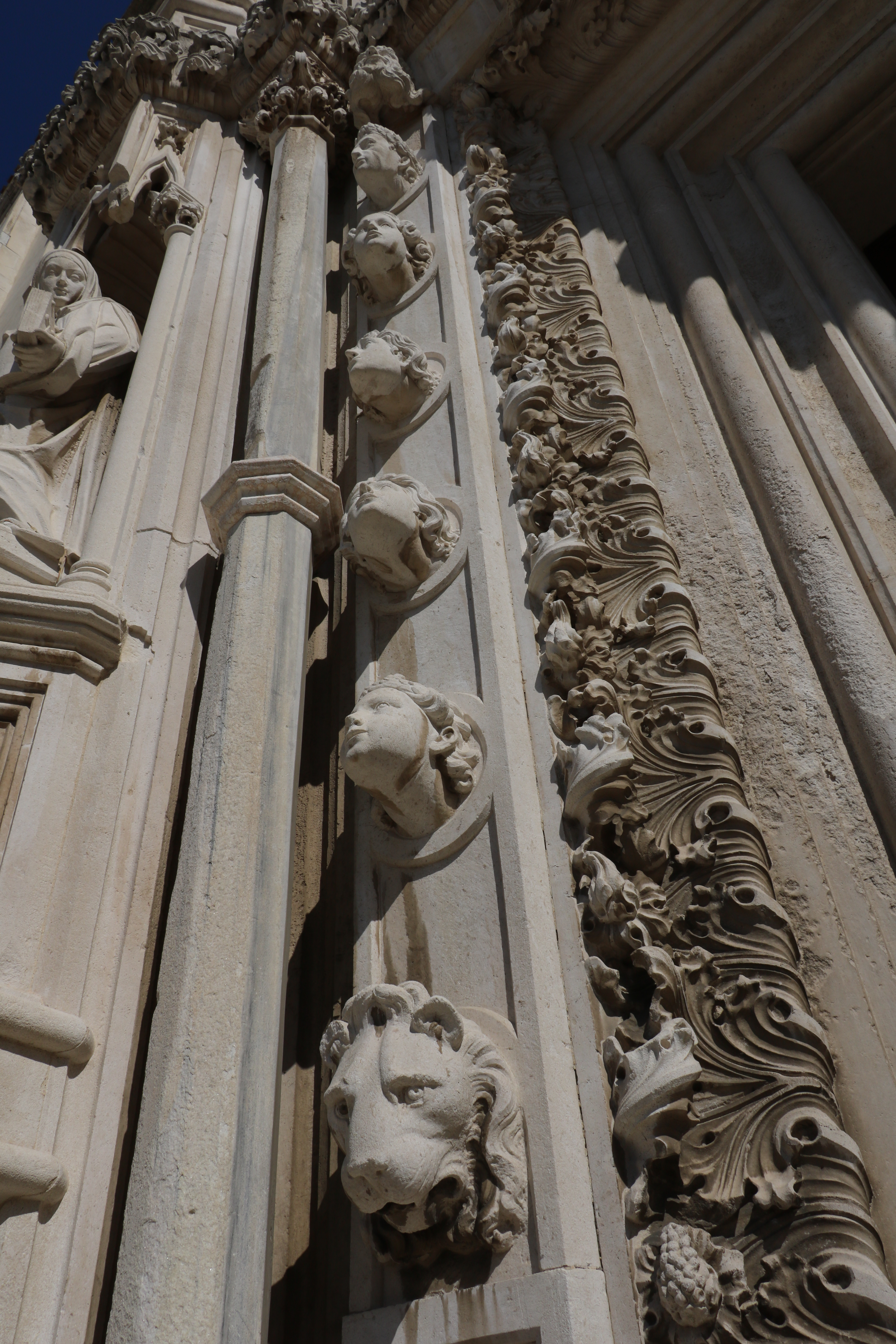
Church of San Francesco alle Scale, Ancona

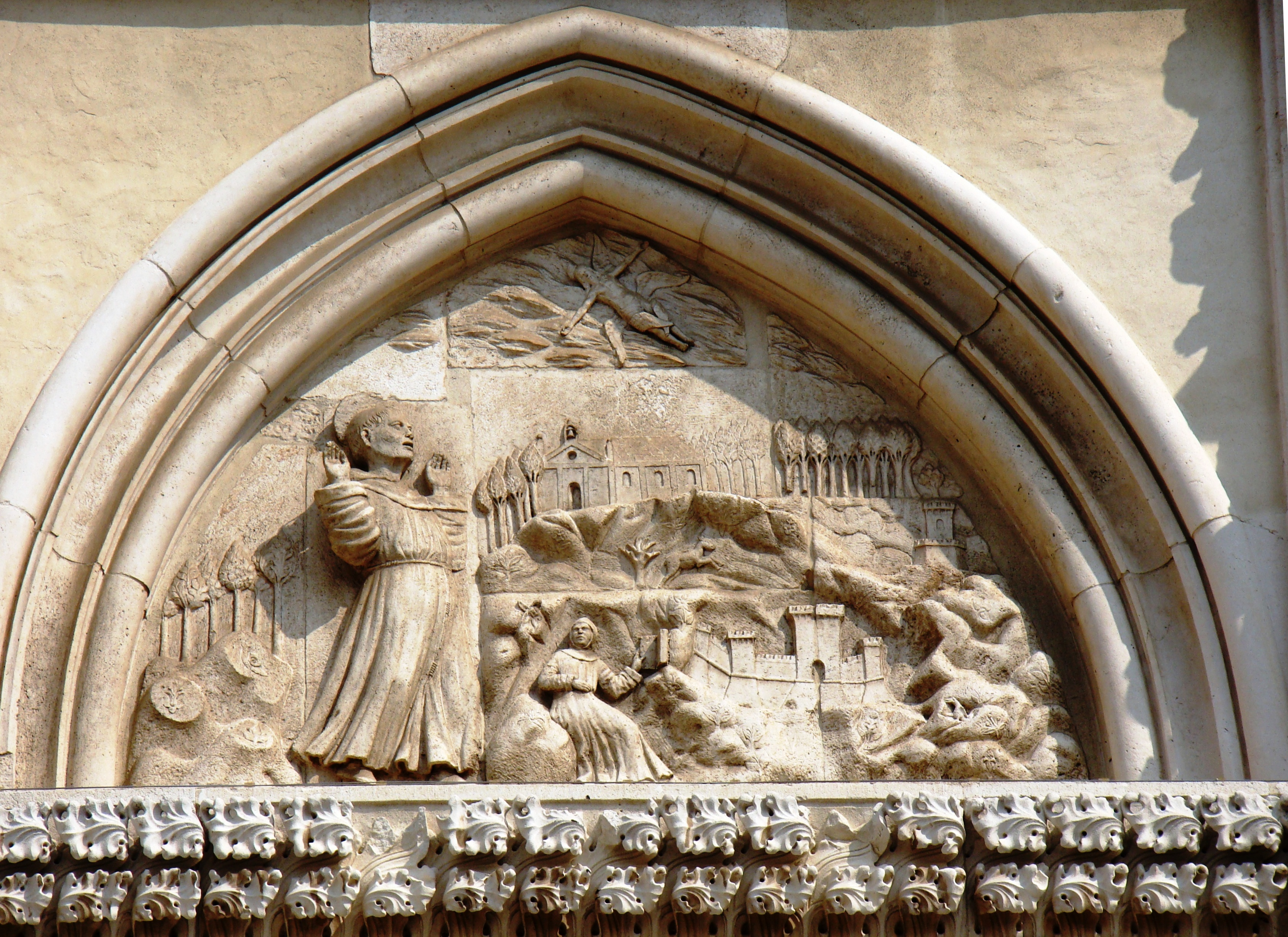
Church of San Francesco alle Scale, Ancona

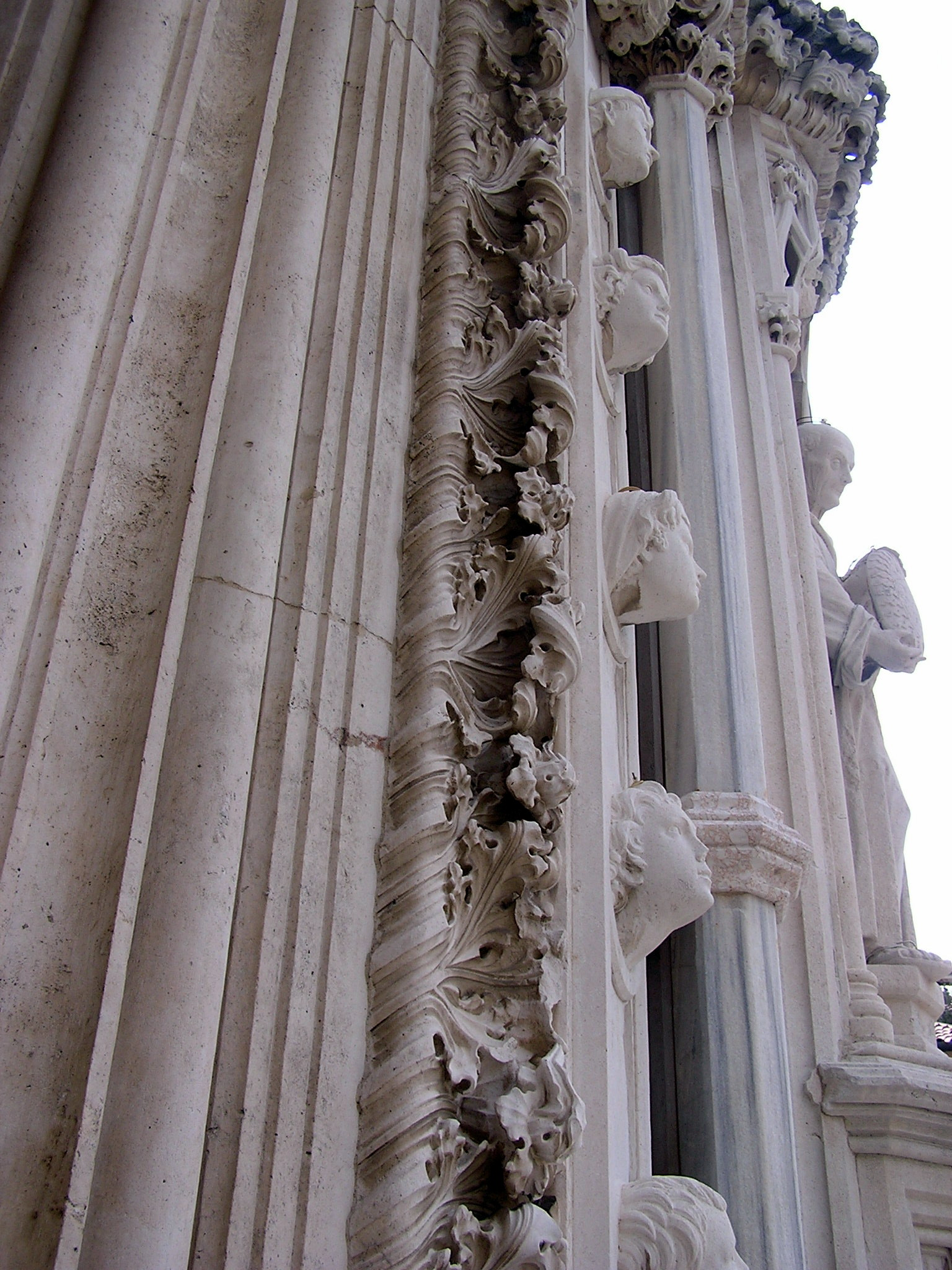
Church of San Francesco alle Scale, Ancona

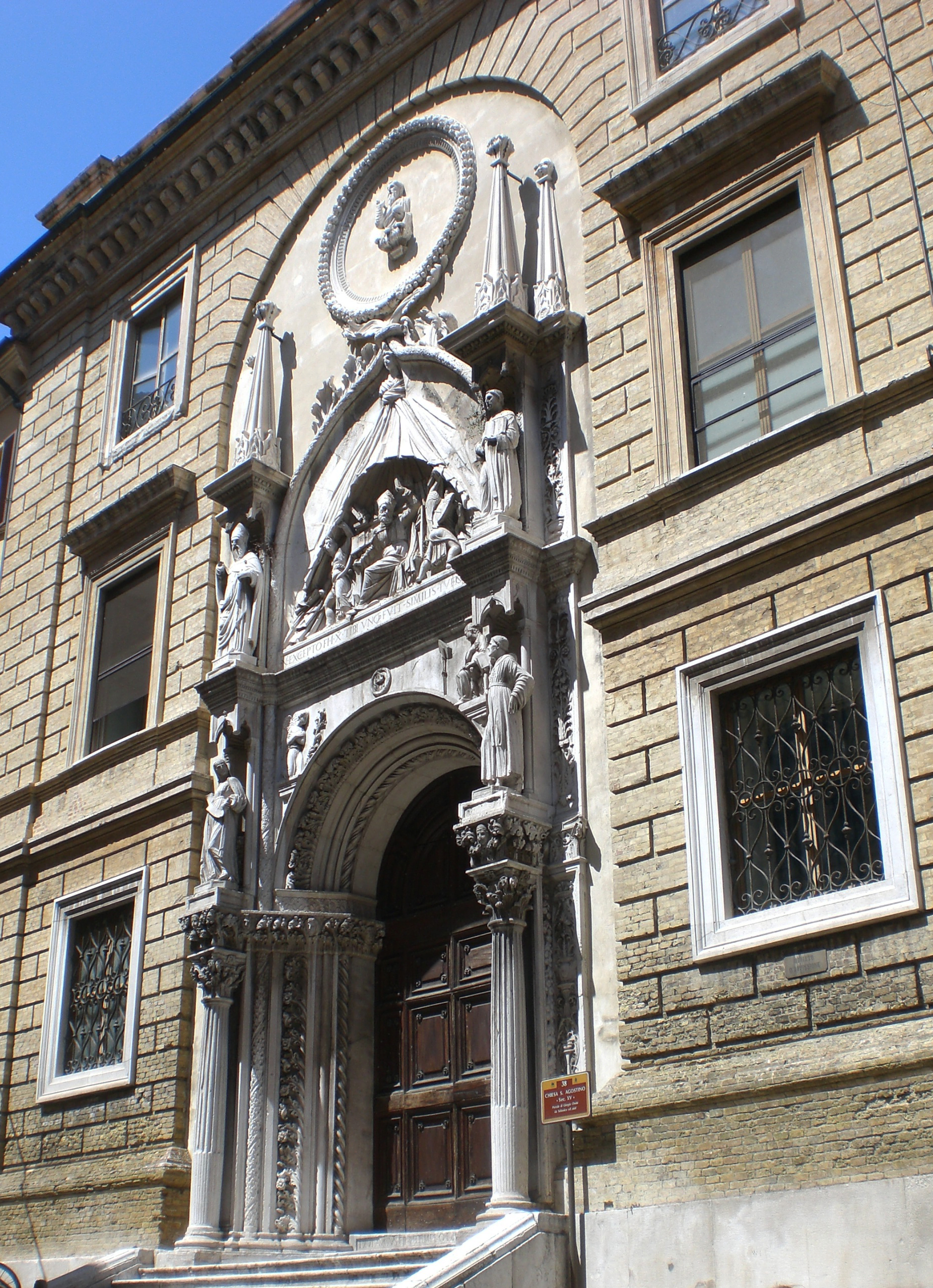
Church of Sant'Agostino, Ancona

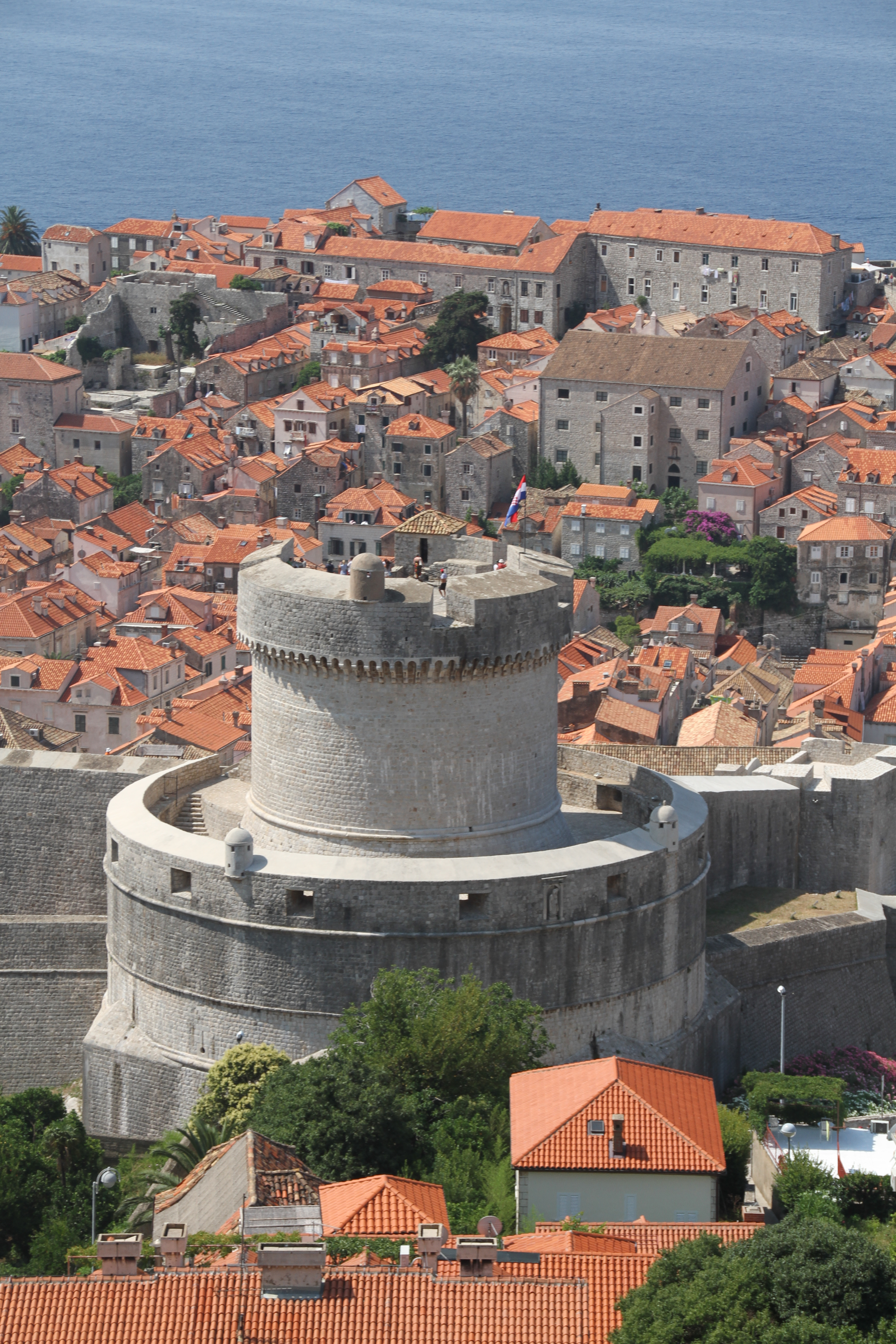
Minčeta Tower, Dubrovnik

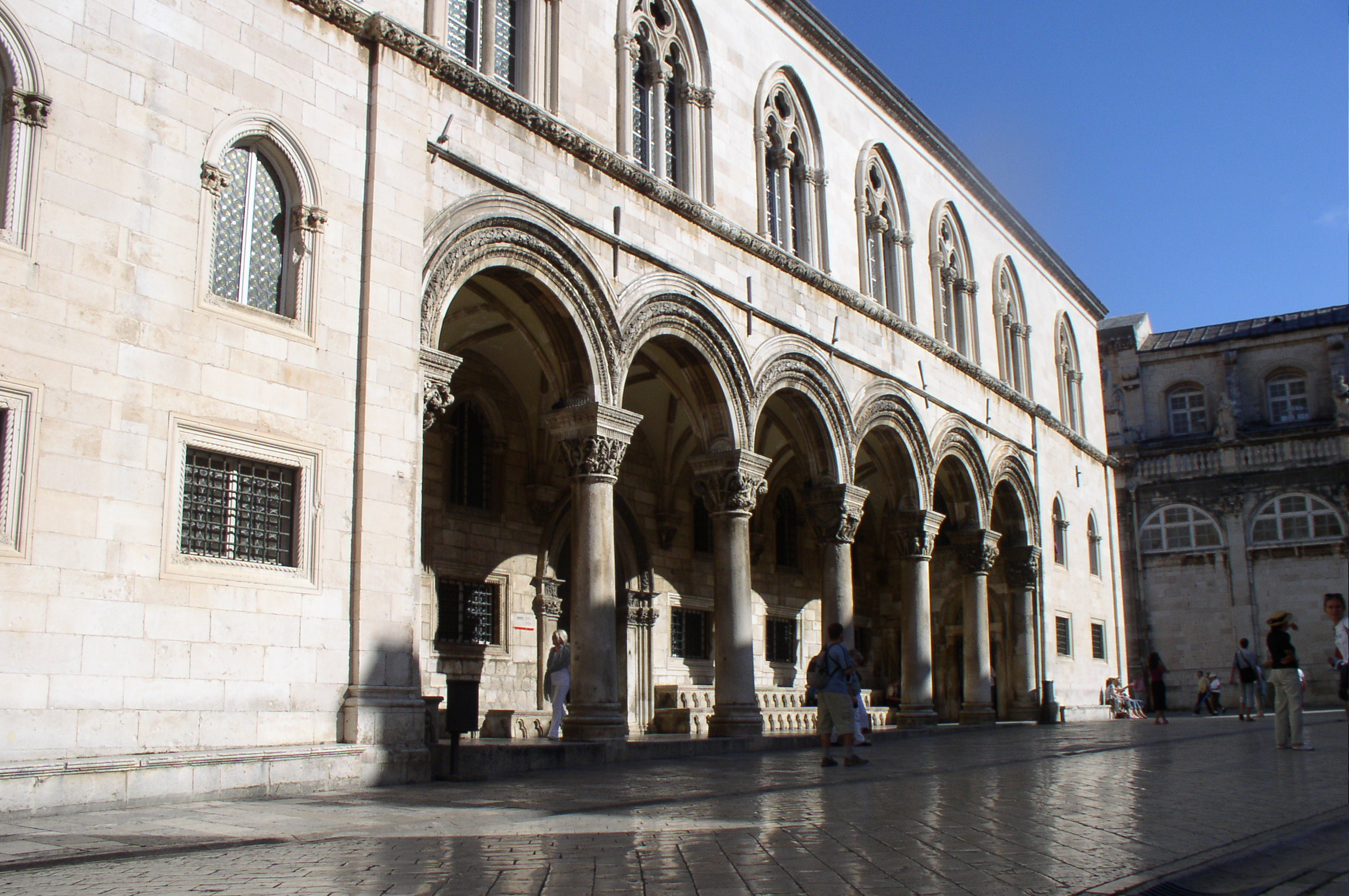
Rector's Palace, Dubrovnik

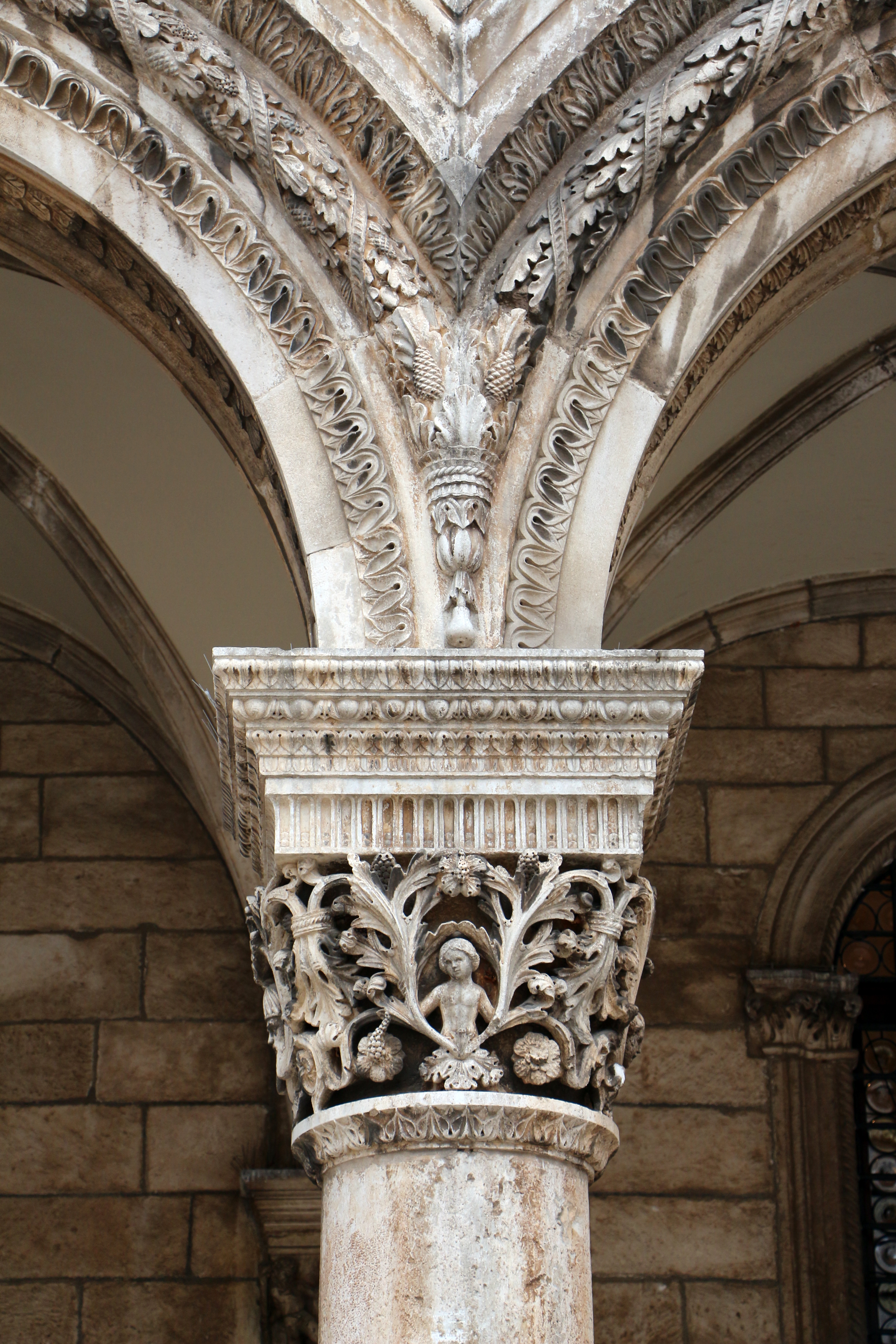
Rector's Palace, Dubrovnik

== Name ==
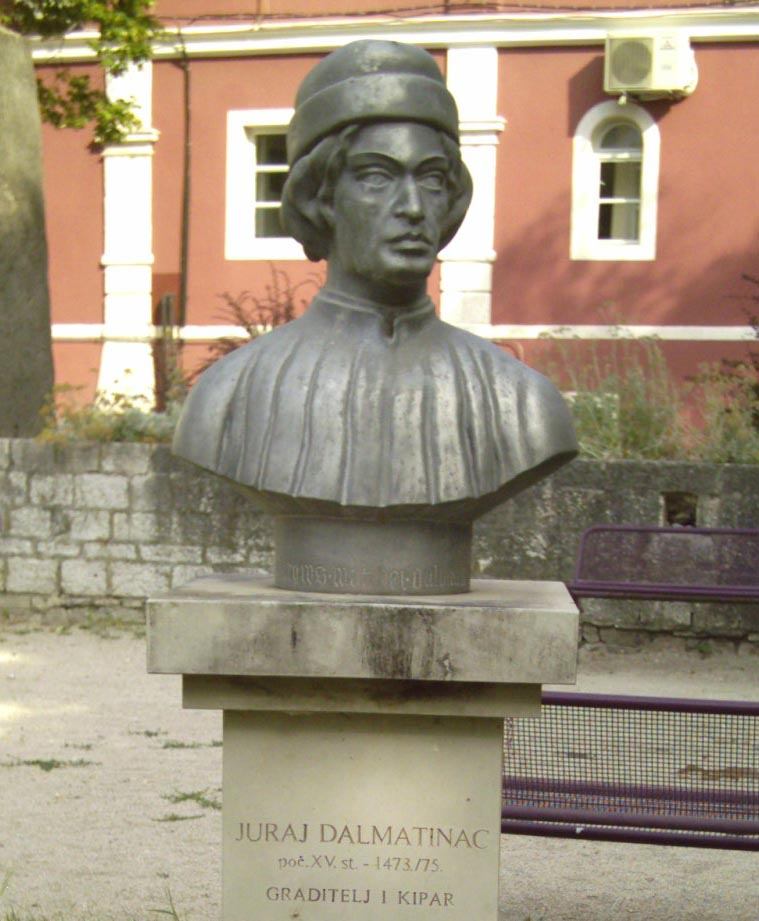
Juraj Dalmatinac (George the Dalmatian) monument in Zadar

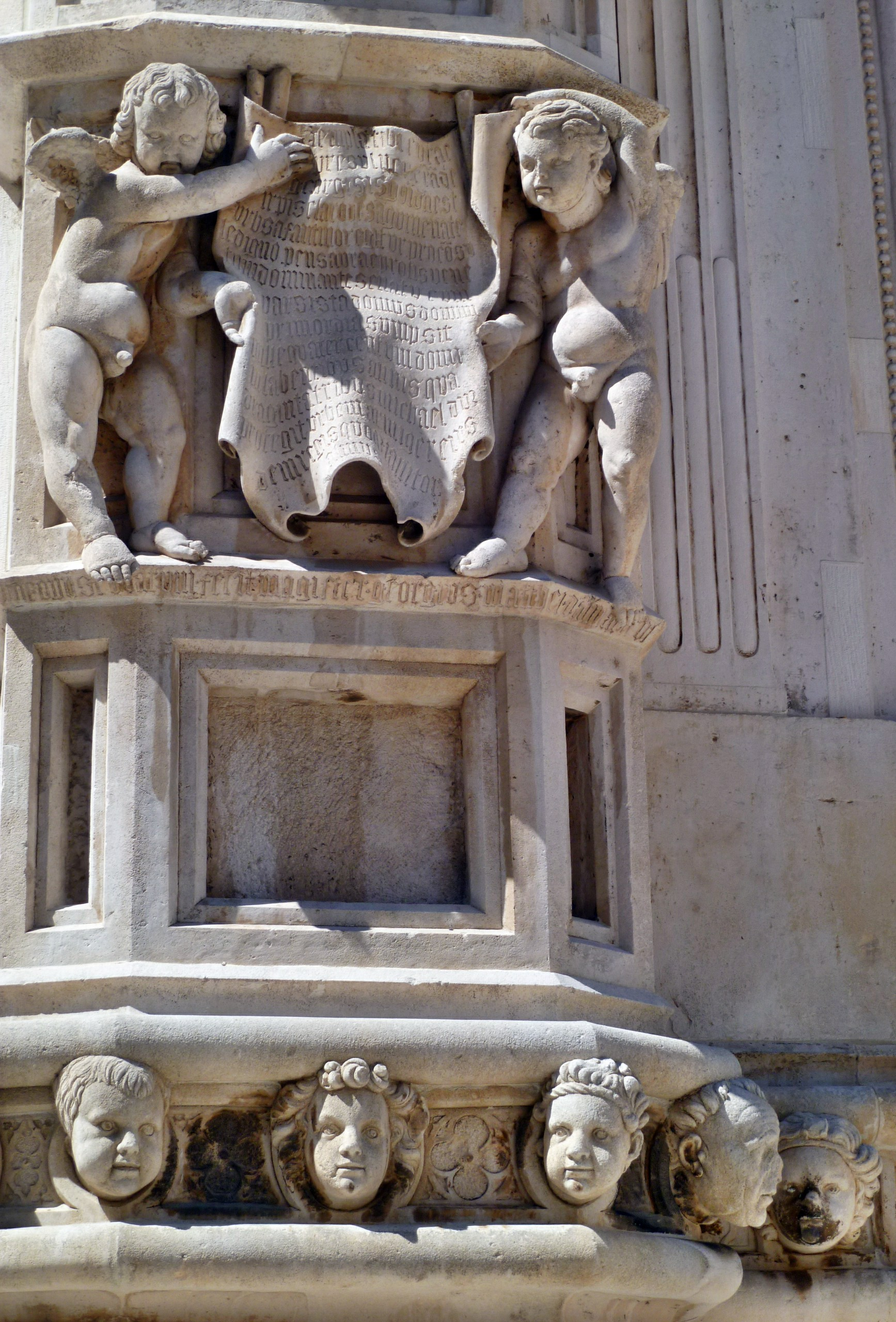
Two Renaissance putti by Giorgio da Sebenico with the consecration inscription of the construction of the Cathedral of St. Jacob in Šibenik, Croatia

At the feet of the two Renaissance putti by the north apse of Šibenik Cathedral of St James, the artist signed in Latin: "hoc opus cuvarum fecit magister Georgius Mathaei Dalmaticus", and on a contract from 1441 he signed: "Georgius lapicida quondam Mathei de Jadra Civis Sibenicenis" (trans. "Georgius sculptor son of Matheus from Zadar citizen of Šibenik"). Those are only known signatures of the artist.

References to the artist are most common under the name Giorgio da Sebenico, and as Giorgio Orsini, particularly in Italian sources or in older English sources. There are also references to him as "Giorgio Dalmatico" or as "George the Dalmatian". He is rarely listed among Croatian sculptors in English-language sources. In Croatia, he is known under the Croatian name of Juraj Matejev Dalmatinac. The family name of Orsini was never used by the artist and it was adopted by his son, after the death of his father.

== Sources ==
- Kokole, Stanko. "Giorgio da Sebenico", Grove Art Online, Oxford Art Online, Oxford University Press, accessed 23 Oct. 2013, subscription required
- Schulz, Anne Markham. "Giorgio da Sebenico and the Workshop of Giovanni Bon", online PDF from Brown University, Providence, accessed 23 October 2013
