= San Francesco alle Scale =

Church building in Ancona, Italy

Coordinates: 43°37′17″N 13°30′43″E

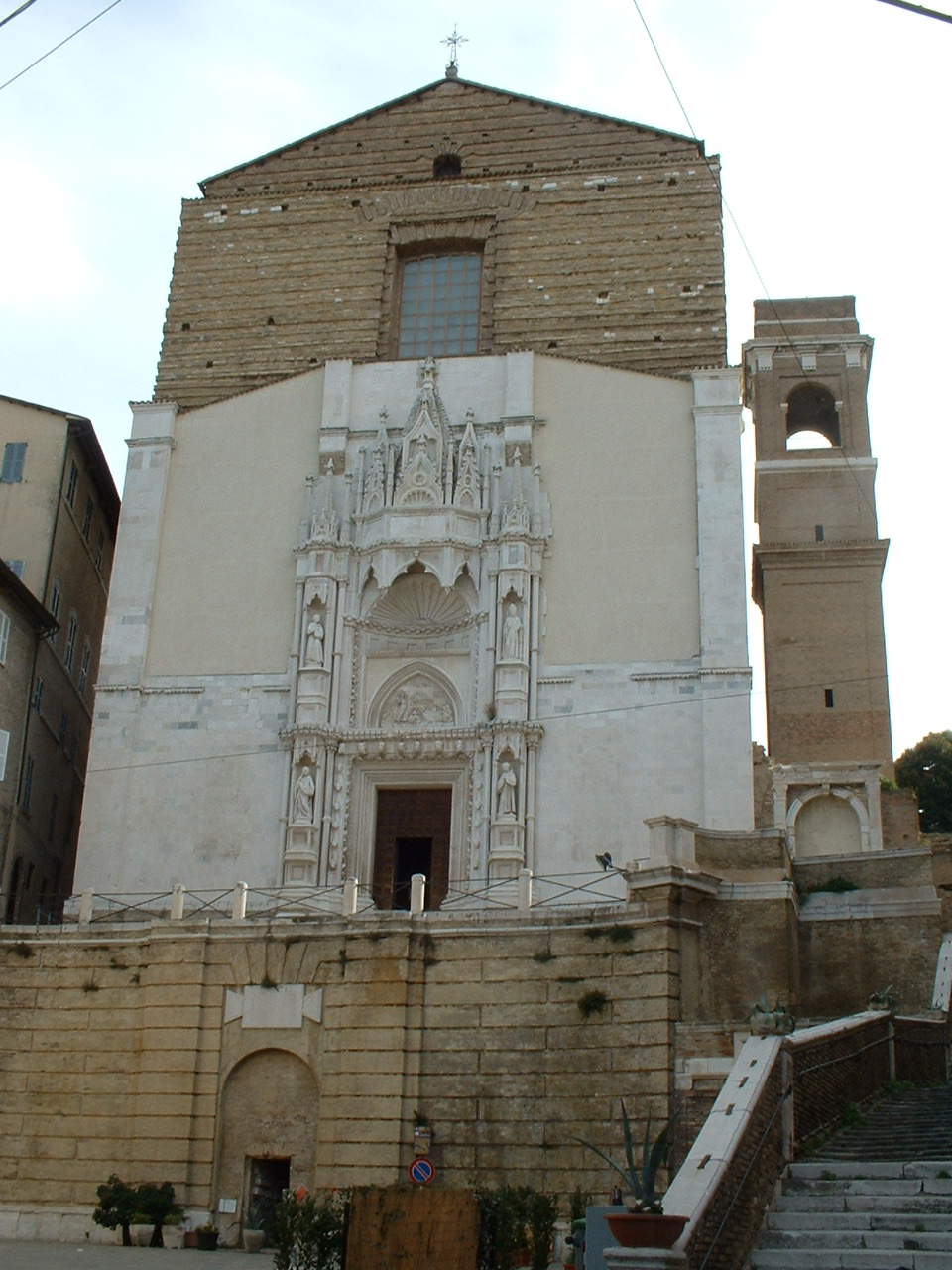
San Francesco alle Scale

San Francesco alle Scale is a church in Ancona, central Italy.

== History ==
Sited at the top of a staircase leading to the eponymous square, the church was founded in 1323 by the Franciscans, and was originally dedicated to Santa Maria Maggiore. It obtained the current denomination in the mid-15th century.

In 1454, the Dalmatian master Giorgio da Sebenico executed the portal, inspired to the late Gothic one of the Porta della Carta in the Ducal Palace of Venice. In the 18th century the church was raised and enlarged by design of architect Francesco Maria Ciaraffoni, who also built the two annexed monastery and the two cloisters.

After the Napoleonic occupation the complex was used as a hospital and, from the 1920s, as a Civic Museum. The church was restored and reopened in 1953. The 18th-century bell tower, which had been destroyed by an Allied bombardment in 1944, was rebuilt at the same time.

== Description ==
The main feature of the façade is the portal, designed by Giorgio da Sebenico with an ornate frame featuring twenty heads and, at the sides, two tall pilasters housing four niches with statues of saints. Above the portal is a Gothic lunette with a bas-relief of St. Francis receiving the Stigmata and, above it, a shell supporting a hexagonal baldachin. The portal leads to a staircase which was rebuilt in the 1920s.

The interior has a single nave and is in 18th-century style. It houses a Baptism of Christ by Pellegrino Tibaldi, a chalk "Glory" by Gioacchino Varlè, the Angels Carrying the Holy House of Loreto by Andrea Lillio and the large Assumption altarpiece by Lorenzo Lotto.
