= 1583 in music =

== Events ==
- Cornet virtuoso Luigi Zenobi relocates to Ferrara, becoming the most highly paid musician at the Este court.

== Publications ==
- Lodovico Agostini – Il nuovo Echo for five voices, book 3, Op. 10 (Ferrara: Vittorio Baldini)
- Elias Ammerbach – Orgel oder Instrument Tabulaturbuch... (Nuremberg: Gerlach), a collection of organ intabulations of various composers
- Giammateo Asola
  - Introitus missarum omnium solemnitatum totius anni, & alleluia, ac musica super canto plano (Brescia: Tomaso Bozzola)
  - In passionibus quatuor evangelistarum Christi locutio for three voices (Venice: Angelo Gardano)
  - Duplex completorium romanum in unum communibus, alterum vero paribus vocibus decantandem (Venice: Giacomo Vincenti & Ricciardo Amadino)
  - Primum pars musices continens hebdomadae sanctae... (Venice: Angelo Gardano)
- Girolamo Belli – First book of madrigals for six voices (Ferrara: Vittorio Baldini)
- Joachim a Burck – Vom Heiligen Ehstande (In Holy Matrimony) for four voices or instruments (Leipzig: Jacob Apel), forty settings of hymns by Ludwig Helmbold
- Maddalena Casulana – First book of madrigals for five voices (Venice: Angelo Gardano)
- Camillo Cortellini – First book of madrigals for five voices (Ferrara: Vittorio Baldini)
- Paschal de l'Estocart – Cent cinquante pseaumes de David (150 Psalms of David) for four, five, six, seven, and eight voices (Lyon: Barthelemi Vincent)
- Costanzo Festa – Litaniae Deiparae Virginis Mariae (Munich: Adam Berg), published posthumously
- Andrea Gabrieli – Psalmi Davidici, qui poenitentiales nuncupantur (Penitential Psalms) for six voices (Venice: Angelo Gardano)
- William Hunnis – Seven sobs of a sorrowfull soule for sinne (London: Henry Denham), a setting of the penitential psalms and other sacred songs
- Nicolas de La Grotte – First book of airs and chansons for three, four, five, and six voices (Paris: Léon Cavellat)
- Orlande de Lassus – Neue teutsche Lieder, geistlich und weltlich (New German Songs, sacred and secular) for four voices (Munich: Adam Berg)
- Cristofano Malvezzi – First book of madrigals for five voices (Venice: heirs of Girolamo Scotto)
- Rinaldo del Mel – Madrigals for four, five, and six voices (Venice: Angelo Gardano)
- Claudio Merulo – First book of motets for six voices (Venice: Angelo Gardano)
- Philippe de Monte – First book of madrigali spirituali for six voices (Venice: Angelo Gardano)
- Claudio Monteverdi – Madrigali spirituali a quattro voci posti in musica da Claudio Monteverde Cremonese, discepolo del Signor Marc'Antonio Ingegnieri (Cremona: Pietro Bozzola & Brescia: Vincenzo Sabbio), a book of madrigals with sacred texts
- Jakob Paix – Ein Schön Nutz und Gebräuchlich Orgel Tabulaturbuch..., a book of organ arrangements of dances and motets by various composers
- Giovanni Pierluigi da Palestrina – Fourth book of masses for five voices (Rome: Alessandro Gardano), setting texts from the Song of Songs
- Giovanni Battista Pinello di Ghirardi – Deutsche Magnificat auff die acht Tonos Musicales (German Magnificats in the eight musical tones) for four and five voices (Dresden: Matthäus Stöckel)

== Births ==
- September 13 – Girolamo Frescobaldi, Ferrarese keyboardist and composer (died 1643)
- December 25 – Orlando Gibbons, English composer (died 1625)
- probable
  - Paolo Agostino, organist and composer (died 1629)
  - Johann Daniel Mylius, chemist and composer for the lute (died 1642)
  - Nicolas Vallet, lutenist and composer (died c.1642)

== Deaths ==
- date unknown – Sebastian Westcott, organist of St Paul's Cathedral (born c.1524)
