= Meshullam of Volterra =

Italian Jewish businessman who traveled to the Holy Land (15th-16th century)

Meshullam ben Menahem of Volterra (Hebrew: משולם בן מנחם; d. 1508), also known as Meshullam da Volterra, was an Italian Jewish businessman who traveled to the Holy Land and surrounding Jewish communities. His works provide concise and important details about the nature and conditions of Ottoman Jewry.

== Early life ==
Meshullam of Volterra was born in the mid-15th century in Volterra, Italy. His father, Menahem ben Aaron, was a wealthy fancier who in 1460 was worth 100,000 ducats. In his early years Meshullam gained notable wealth by trading precious stones. According to Abraham Portaleone, Meshullam wrote a book on jewelry.

He later took over his father's successful loan-bank in Florence, where he became friendly with Lorenzo de Medici, to whom he once sent a gift of game. During this time, Meshullam began to develop an interest in Jewish literature and philosophy, which inspired him to visit the Holy Land.

== Travels ==
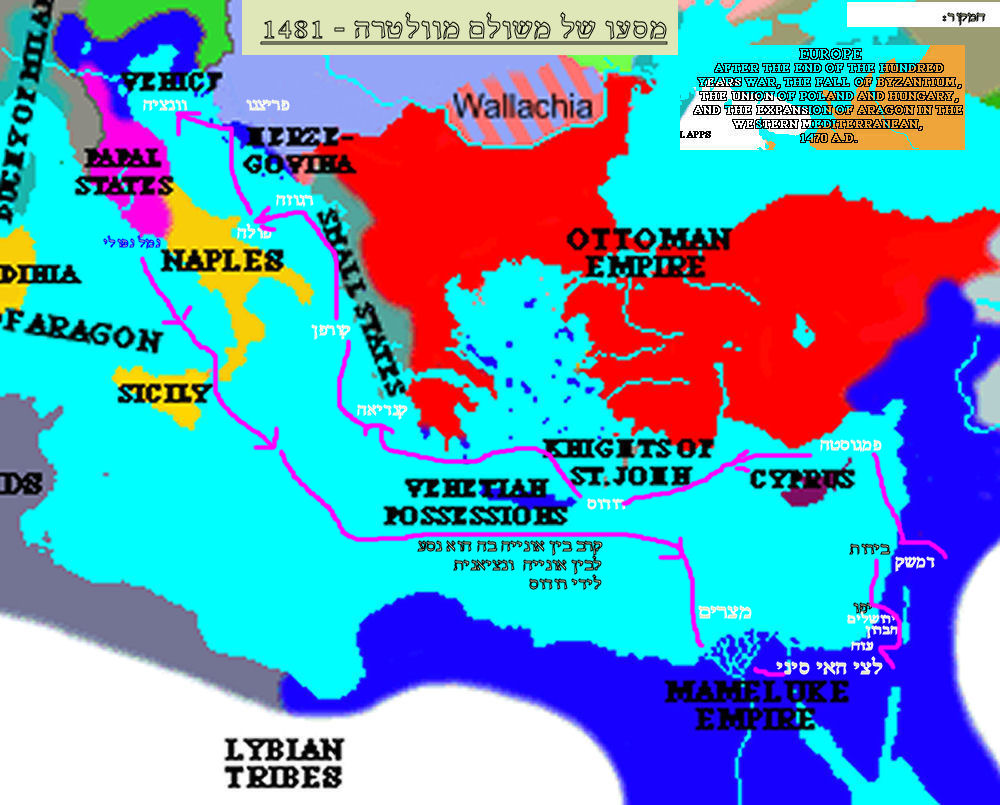
The travels of Meshullam of Volterra

On May 28, 1481, he set out from Naples on his journey to the East., going by way of Rhodes to Alexandria, where he apparently saw a beautiful manuscript of the Hebrew Bible, which the natives claimed had been written by Ezra. In Cairo, he bought gems and was greeted by Solomon ben Joseph. On July 29, he reached Jerusalem, where he reported that there were about 250 Jewish families. There, he reported that Jews went to pray near the site of the Temple on Tisha B'Av to mourn its destruction. He passed through Jaffa and Damascus to Crete, where he was shipwrecked, and lost his precious stones. His life was saved by a German Jewish physician, and Meshullam finally reached Venice in October.

Meshullam wrote an account in Hebrew of his journey called Massa Meshullam mi-Volterra be-Erez Yisrael (מסע משולם מוולטרה בארץ-ישראל), which contains a wealth of information about the cities he visited as well as their Jewish communities and traditions. He also gives much information of economic interest. While occasionally noting local legends, he is often skeptical about them. He also shows some familiarity with classical literature. His style is readable and attractive, with numerous Italian expressions, although containing some grammatical errors.

Meshullam died in 1507 or 1508 in Venice.
