= Altarpiece of the Halberd =

Painting by Lorenzo Lotto

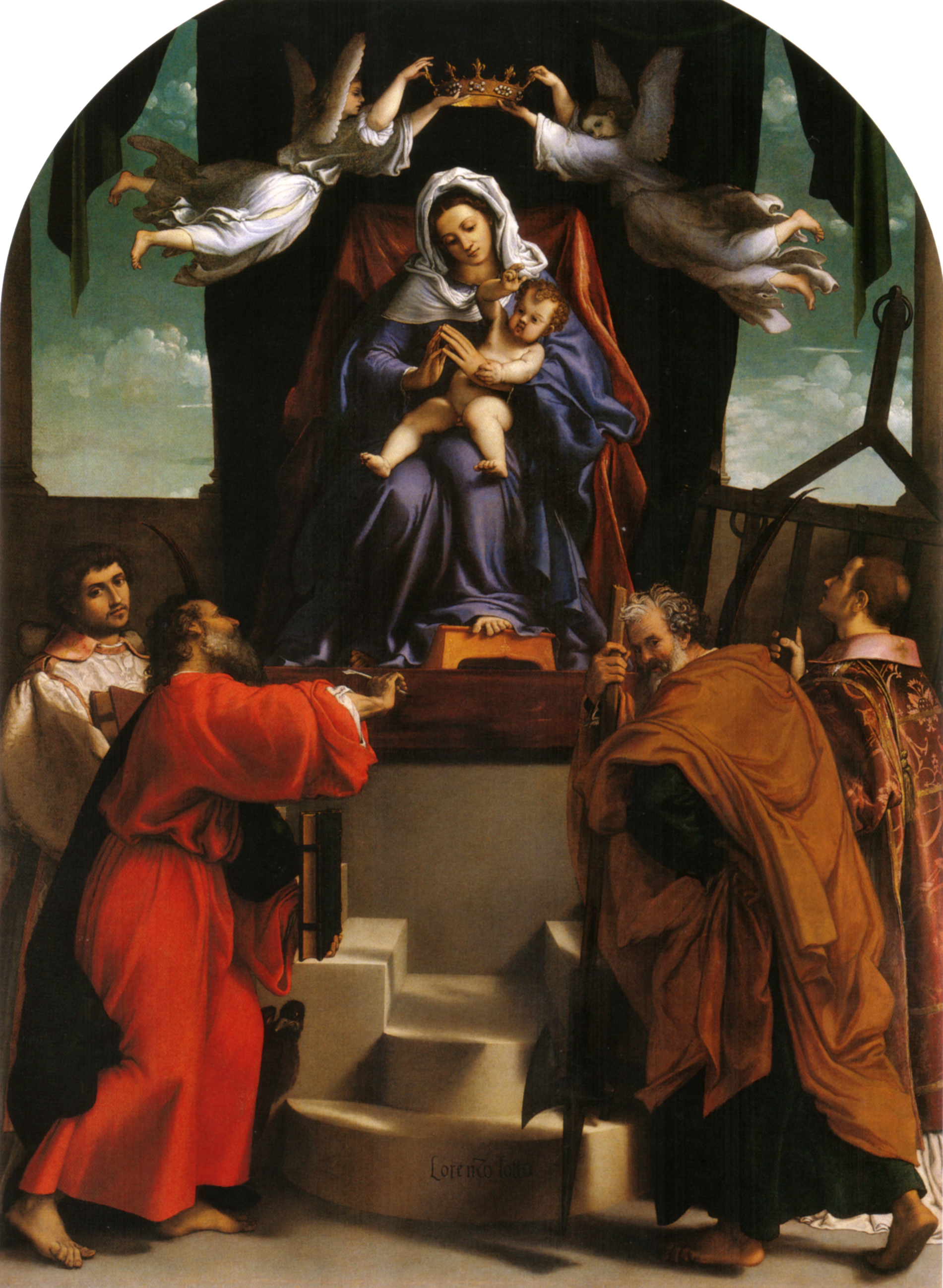
- Artist: Lorenzo Lotto
- Year: c. 1539
- Medium: Oil on canvas
- Dimensions: 294 cm × 216 cm (116 in × 85 in)
- Location: Pinacoteca civica Francesco Podesti; Ancona

The Altarpiece of the Halberd is an oil-on-canvas painting created ca.1539 by the Italian High Renaissance painter Lorenzo Lotto. It is housed in the Pinacoteca civica Francesco Podesti of Ancona, central Italy.

== History ==
The work was seen by the art biographer Giorgio Vasari in the church of Sant'Agostino in Ancona, where Lotto had fled in reply to the hostility received in Venice. It was later moved to the church of Santa Maria della Piazza and, after other locations, the current one.

The painting dates to a few years after the coup by which Ancona had been restored to the Papal States. The resistance had been brutally suppressed, many of the rebels having been beheaded by order of the papal legate. The upside-down halberd has been thus interpreted as a symbol of peace.

== Description ==
The monumental composition is taken directly from the tradition of Holy Conversations in the Venetian School, inaugurated by Antonello da Messina's San Cassiano Altarpiece. It shows the Madonna and Child on a high throne, with two angels holding the crown (a 15th-century Flemish painting element also in use in Italy). In the lower part are four saints: Stephen, John the Evangelist, Simon the Zealot and Lawrence. Simon is holding the halberd which gives its name to the altarpiece. At the sides of the throne, between columns and draperies, are two sections of sky with clouds.

As in other paintings by Lotto, the symmetry is broken by the variety of postures and gestures. The work is characterized by a certain archaic style, explainable by the relatively provincial commissioners and the late stage of his career.

== Sources ==
- Pirovano, Carlo (2002). Lotto. Milan: Electa.
