= Daniel Terni =

Italian rabbi

Daniel ben Moses David Terni (Hebrew: דניאל בן משה דוד טירני; 1760s–1814) was an Italian rabbi, poet, and Biblical commentator.

He was a native of Ancona, one of the three cities in the Papal States in which Jews were permitted to live. He was orphaned at a young age, and raised by his maternal grandfather Daniel Naḥamo, a student of Samson Morpurgo.

After teaching for some time in Lugo, he was called to the rabbinate of Florence.

== Works ==
- Se'udat Mitzvah. Venice. 1791. A collection of sermons for holy days and responsa.
- Simḥat Mitzvah. Florence. 1793. A two-part dramatic poem commemorating the inauguration of a new synagogue in Florence.
- Matenat Yad. Florence. 1795. A treatise on charity presented in sermon form.
- Ikere Dinim. Florence. 1803–1806. A compendium of the laws in the Shulḥan Arukh (Oraḥ Ḥayyim and Yoreh De'ah). Also known as Iḳḳere ha-Da"t.
- Derek Siaḥ. A collection of casuistic sermons.
- En Ketz. A bibliographical work similar to Shabbethai Bass' Sifte Yeshenim.
- Shem Olam. A commentary on the Pentateuch.
