= Stefano Maria Benvenuti Gostoli =

Italian politician

Member of the Chamber of Deputies of Italy
- Constituency: Marche 3

Personal details
- Born: January 17, 1976 (age 50) Ancona
- Party: Brothers of Italy

Stefano Maria Benvenuti Gostoli is a member of the Chamber of Deputies of Italy.
