= Santa Maria della Piazza, Ancona =

Church building in Ancona, Italy

Coordinates: 43°37′14″N 13°30′37″E

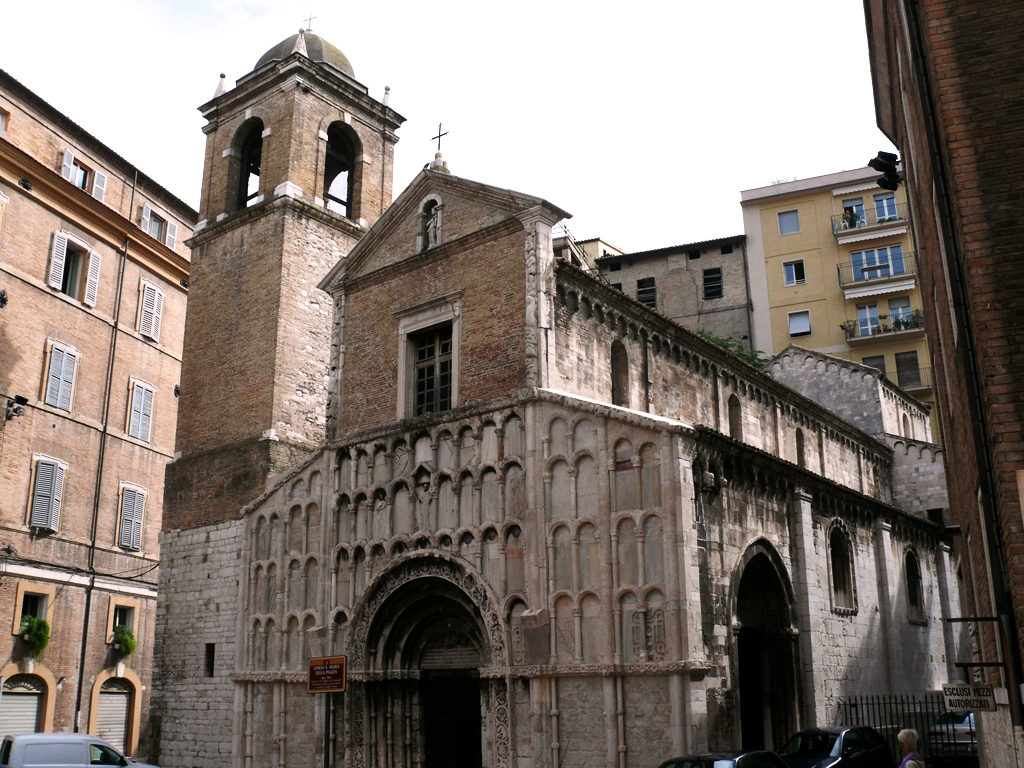
Santa Maria della Piazza

Santa Maria della Piazza is a church in Ancona, central Italy.

The church, a fine example of Romanesque architecture in the city, was erected between the 11th and the 12th centuries. Before its construction, the site was home to two small Palaeo-Christian churches, dating to the 6th and 7th centuries. Part of the current church's pavement is in glass to allow visibility to some of the remains of the latter.

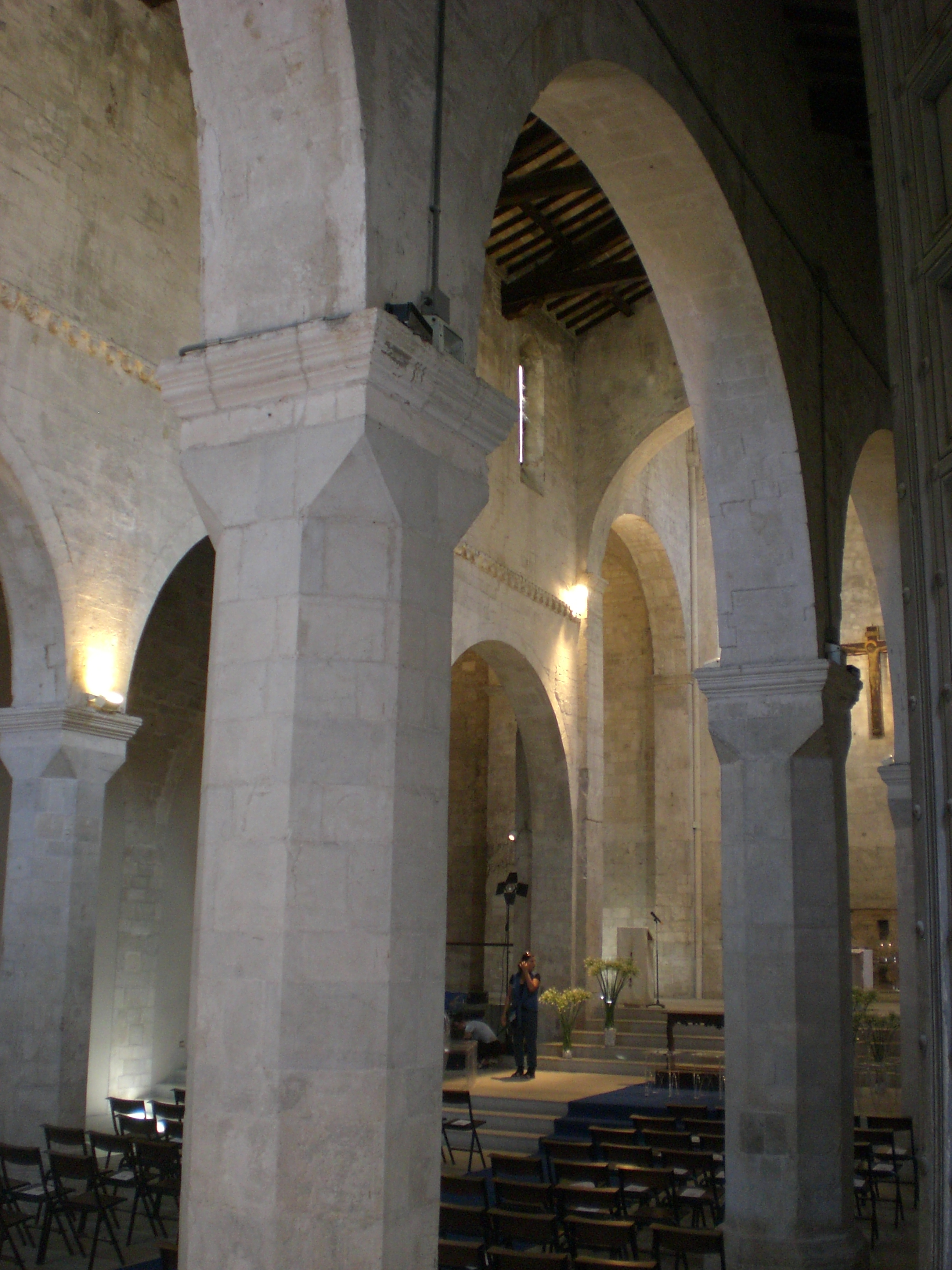
Interior view

The building has a rectangular plan, with a nave and two aisles, and a raised apse. The lower part of the façade has numerous blind arches and, in the middle, a statue of the Virgin Mary. At the top, dating to the reconstruction (together with the brickwork part of the annexed bell tower) after the 1690 earthquake, is a rectangular window. The master of the façade (1210) was one Master Filippo (as testified by an inscription in the lunette), while the arched portal is attributed to one Master Leonardo. Master Filippo was also responsible of the reconstruction of the Romanesque cathedral of San Leopardo and of Santa Tecla at Osimo.

In the subterraneans are remains from several Palaeo-Christian churches, including some mosaics. The oldest ones belonged to an older building, perhaps destroyed during the Gothic Wars (6th century), and above which the newer and less refined ones were later added. Other remains include a pit, some traces of the ancient Greek Ancona's walls and some frescoes.

The church was once home to Lorenzo Lotto's Altarpiece of the Halberd, now in Ancona's Municipal Pinacoteca.

== Sources ==
- Pirani, Vincenzo (1998). Le chiese d'Ancona. Edizione dell'Arcidiocesi d'Ancona e Osimo.
