= Giovanni Francesco Cassioni =

17th-century Italian wood engraver

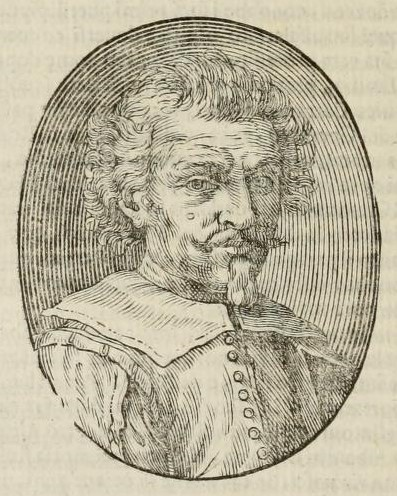
Portrait of Emilio Savonanzi by Cassioni

Giovanni Francesco Cassioni was a 17th-century Italian engraver in wood. He was born in Bologna, and made a number of portraits of painters for Carlo Cesare Malvasia to use in his Felsina Pittrice in 1678.
