= Antonio Francesco Peruzzini =

Italian painter

Antonio Francesco Peruzzini (1643 or 1646 – 20 August 1724) was an Italian painter of the Baroque period.

== Biography ==
He was born in Ancona, son of Domenico, a painter. He painted two landscapes depicting storms in Loreto; work influenced by Salvatore Rosa, but also by Dutch landscape artists popular in Italy, such Plattenberg and Mulier. His works often included capricci, similar to those seen in works by Marco Ricci.

Peruzzini travelled prior to 1687 to Venice, Bologna, Modena, Parma, Casale Monferrato and Turin. He stayed in Bologna from 1682 to 1686, where he worked in collaboration with Sebastiano Ricci and Giovanni Antonio Burrini. In this period, he contributed to Temptations of St Antony and Landscape with wood-cutter (1690s). In 1703, he moved to Tuscany, patronized by Ferdinand de' Medici, and he worked with Alessandro Magnasco, painting landscapes for the painter known for his small figures. Together they painted Landscape with frati penitenti di Stockholm or Landscape with St Francis in Ecstasy now in the Uffizi. He followed Magnasco to Milan in 1712–13, and they continued collaborations until 1720–25.
