= Paolo Bartolommeo Clarici =

Italian painter (1673–1721)

Paolo Bartolommeo Clarici (1673–1721) was an Italian painter, active in a late Baroque style.

He was born in Ancona, but traveled to Rome where he received a broad education, including design. He moved to Padua where he was close to Cardinal Giorgio Cornaro. He became a priest.

With the patronage of Cardinal Cornaro, he became president of the Paduan Academy of Fine Arts. The cardinal commissioned from him topographic maps of Rovigo and the Polesine. He also made maps of the terrain around Udine for Federigo Corner, brother of the Cardinal and Lugotenente of Friuli.

He also painted flowers with botanical exactitude. A publication of this designs of flowers was published by Poletti in 1726 in Venice.
