= Eugenio Duca =

Italian politician (1950–2021)

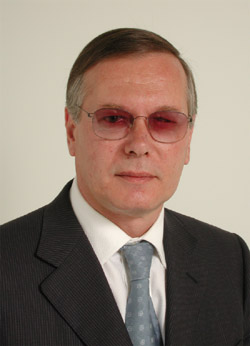

Member of the Chamber of Deputies of Italy
- In office 15 April 1994 – 27 April 2006
- Constituency: Marche

Personal details
- Born: 27 February 1950 Ancona, Italy
- Died: 5 October 2021 (aged 71) Ancona, Italy
- Party: PDS; DS

Eugenio Duca (27 February 1950 – 5 October 2021) was an Italian politician.

== Biography ==
During the 1970s, Duca was active in a railway workers' union and served on the Permanent Maritime Commission of the Camera di Commercio, Industria, Agricoltura e Artigianato from 1978 to 1983. He served as a city councilor in Ancona from 1983 to 1997. He was elected to represent Marche in the Chamber of Deputies in 1994 and joined the coalition Alliance of Progressives. He was re-elected in 1996 and 2001 as part of the coalition The Olive Tree. He served as national leader of the Democrats of the Left in the maritime economic sector until 2007.

In 2009, Duca ran for mayor of Ancona, but earned only 5.9% of the vote.

Eugenio Duca died of a heart attack in Ancona on 5 October 2021, at the age of 71.
