= Leone Levi =

English jurist and statistician (1821–1888)

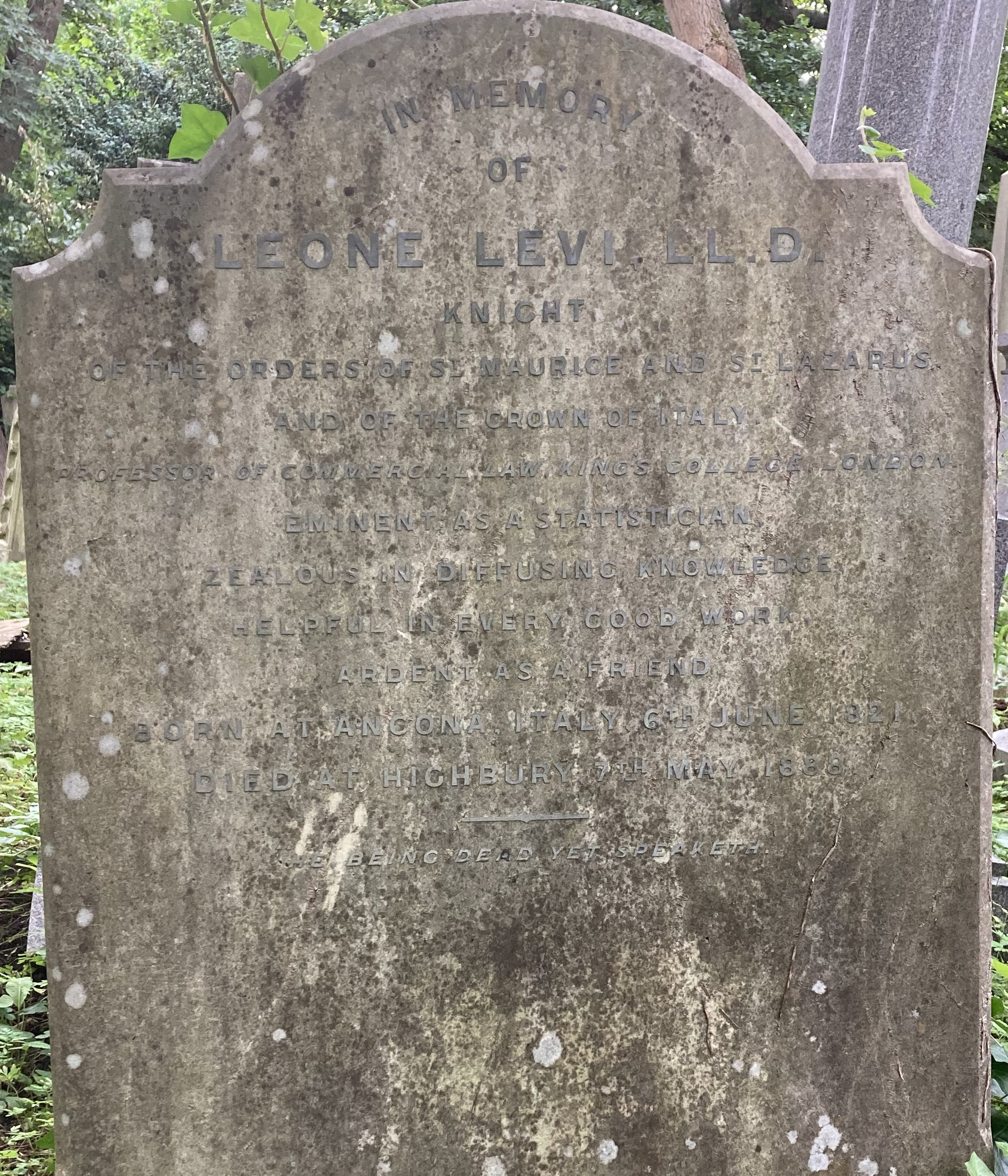
- Grave of Leone Levi in Highgate Cemetery
- Born: 6 June 1821; Ancona, Italy
- Died: 7 May 1888 (aged 66); Highbury, England
- Citizenship: British
- Education: University of Tübingen
- Occupations: Jurist, Statistician
- Known for: Chair of Commercial Law at King's College London
- Notable work: Commercial Law of the World, History of British Commerce and of the Economic Progress of the British Nation, 1763-1870

Leone Levi (6 June 1821 – 7 May 1888) was an English jurist and statistician.

Born to a Jewish family in Ancona, Italy, he worked in commerce there before emigrating to Liverpool in 1844. There he obtained British citizenship, changed his faith, and joined the Presbyterian church.

At the time, English law regarding the establishment of local chambers of commerce was highly unsystematic and wanting. He therefore advocated their institution in numerous pamphlets, leading to the establishment of the Liverpool Chamber of Commerce in 1849, with Levi as its secretary. In 1850 he published his Commercial Law of the World, an exhaustive comparative treatise upon the laws and codes of mercantile countries. Appointed in 1852 to the chair of commercial law at King's College London, he was a popular instructor who innovated evening classes.

Levi was called to the bar at Lincoln's Inn in 1859, and a doctorate in political science from the University of Tübingen. His chief work, History of British Commerce and of the Economic Progress of the British Nation, 1763-1870, is considered to be a partisan account of British economic development, but its value as a work of reference cannot be gainsaid. His other works include: Work and Pay; Wages and Earnings of the Working Classes; and International Law, with Materials for a Code. See also The Liquor Trades: A Report to M.T. Bass, M.P., on the Capital Invested and Number of Persons Employed Therein (1871).

He died at his home in Highbury on 7 May 1888 and was buried in the eastern side of Highgate Cemetery.
