= Federico Bonaventura =

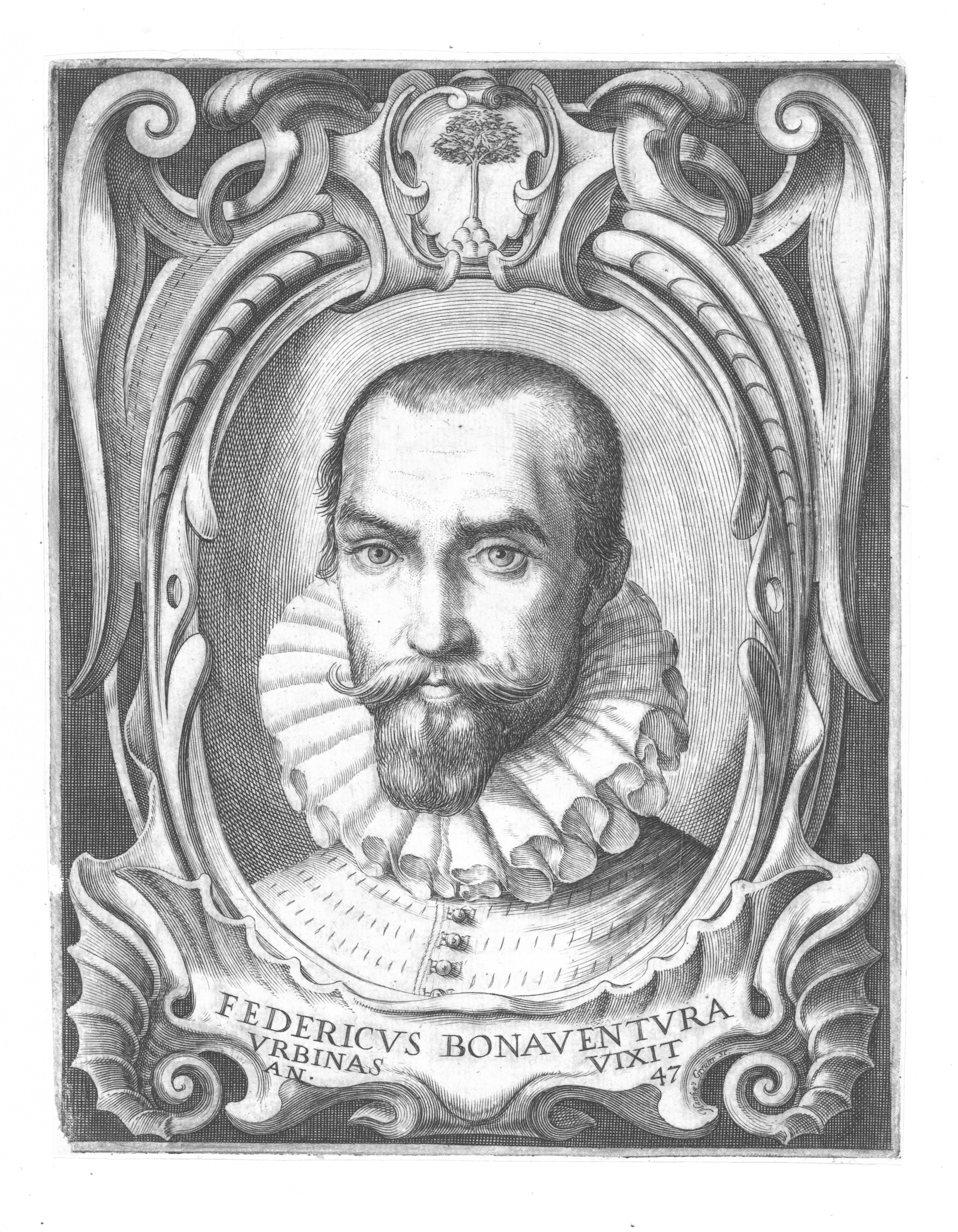

Federico Bonaventura (24 August 1555 – 25 March 1602) was an Italian nobleman, natural philosopher and Renaissance humanist. Among his contributions was an Aristotelian view of meteorology, particularly the winds. In a posthumously published work Delle ragion di stato (1623), he examined the role of a secular state.

== Biography ==
Bonaventura was born in Ancona where his father Pietro was a military officer serving the Duke of Urbino. His mother Leonora Landriani also came from a noble Milanese family. When his father died in service while on an expedition in Malta against Turkish forces, the young Bonanventura was cared for by Cardinal Giulio della Rovere and introduced into the court of Francesco Maria II, Duke of Urbino, only about six years older than himself. His scholarly interests were recognized and he was encouraged to study Greek, read the classics, and write several commentaries. He also served as a statesman on several missions on behalf of the Duke of Urbino.

== Bibliography ==
- Firpo, Luigi (1969). "Bonaventura, Federico". Dizionario Biografico degli Italiani, Volume 11: Boccadibue–Bonetti (in Italian). Rome: Istituto dell'Enciclopedia Italiana. ISBN 978-8-81200032-6.
- Schmitt, Charles B. (1970). "Bonaventura, Federigo". In Charles Coulston Gillispie (ed.). Dictionary of Scientific Biography. Vol. II. New York: Charles Scribner's Sons. p. 283.
