= Giuseppe Sturani =

Italian conductor

Giuseppe Sturani (1875 – January 17, 1940) was an Italian conductor who was known for his work in the field of opera.

== Biography ==
Born in Ancona, Sturani worked as a conductor at La Fenice in Venice and the Teatro Regio in Turin before moving to the United States in 1908 to join the conducting staffs of two opera companies operated by Oscar Hammerstein I: the Manhattan Opera Company and the Philadelphia Opera Company. While working with these companies, he became a close friend and associate of conductor Cleofonte Campanini. In 1911, he joined the conducting staff at the Metropolitan Opera at the behest of Giulio Gatti-Casazza. He remained at the Met until 1915 when he left to join the conducting staff at the Chicago Opera Association (COA) at the invitation of Campanini. He remained with the COA through 1919. In 1920 he led a touring opera troupe in performances throughout South America and Mexico, after which he retired from conducting. In 1928 he was appointed musical secretary at the Metropolitan Opera, a position he held until his death 12 years later. He died in Manhattan at the age of 65.
