= Emilio Savonanzi =

Italian painter (1580–1666)

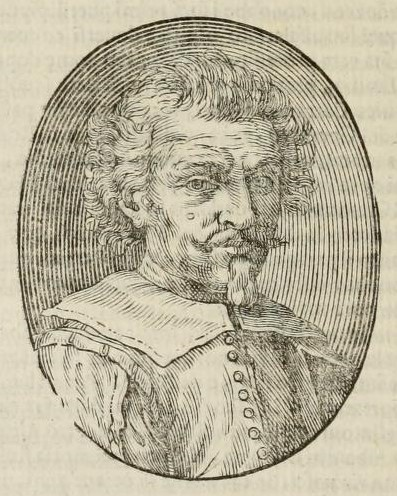
- Portrait of Savonanzi by Giovanni Francesco Cassioni
- Born: 1580
- Died: 1666 (aged 85–86)
- Notable work: Scene from the Life of Santa Lucia
- Movement: Baroque

Emilio Savonanzi, nicknamed il Reniano (1580 – 1666) was an Italian painter of the Baroque period, active mainly in and around his native Bologna. He trained under Guido Reni, hence his nickname.

He painted a Scene from the Life of Santa Lucia for the church of San Martino in Sant'Anatolia di Narco. He painted frescoes about the Life of the Virgin in the church of Santa Maria della Grazia in Camerino. He painted a Deposition now in the Accademia Carrara in Bergamo.

Luigi Lanzi describes him as an erudite, eclectic, wealthy and peripatetic, but not assembling his knowledge into excellence:

Savonanzi, a Bolognese noble, attached himself to the art when nearly arrived at manhood, but he attended Cremonini more than Calvart; and strongly addicted to changing masters, entered the school of Lodovico Caracci, next that of Guido at Bologna, of Guercino at Cento, and finally the studio of Algardi, a sculptor at Rome. By such means he became a good theorist and an able lecturer, applauded in every particular of his art; nor was he wanting in good practice, uniting many styles in one, in which however that of Guido most prevails. Still he was not equally correct in all his pieces, even betraying feebleness of touch, and not scrupling to denominate himself an artist of many hands. He resided at Ancona, next at Camerino, at which places, as well as in the adjacent districts, he left a variety of works.
