= Angelo Minghetti =

Italian sculptor

Angelo Minghetti (1822–1885) was an Italian ceramist and painter of maiolica pieces.

He was a resident of Bologna, where he studied at the Academy of Fine Arts. he moved to Ancona, and where, while working for the Papal Army, was accused of pilfering supplies. By 1843, he was acquitted and returned to Bologna. There, he established a factory for the production of maiolica. He works were often sculptural, painted, including figures and busts. The factory was continued by his sons Gennaro and Arturo. In 1908, Gennaro's son, Aurelio gave the company the name of "Ceramiche Artistiche Angelo Minghetti & Figli", which finally closed in 1967. Angelo displayed his work at various national exhibitions including 1880 in Turin, and 1883 in Rome.

An Italian tenor active in the 1930s has the same name as he was his grandson.
