= Giuseppe Gatta =

Italian footballer

Personal information
- Full name: Giuseppe Gatta
- Date of birth: 24 November 1967 (age 58)
- Place of birth: Ancona, Italy
- Height: 1.84 m (6 ft 0 in)
- Position: Goalkeeper

Youth career
- 1985–1986: Pescara

Senior career*
Years	Team	Apps	(Gls)
1986–1990	Pescara	77	(0)
1990–1996	Lecce	113	(0)
1996–2000	Monza	24	(0)
2001	Spezia	0	(0)
2002–2003	Bellusco		
2003–2005	Rozzato		
2005–2007	Concorezzese		
- * Club domestic league appearances and goals

Giuseppe Gatta (born 24 November 1967) is a retired Italian football goalkeeper. He previously played for Delfino Pescara 1936, US Lecce, Calcio Monza, Spezia Calcio, Bellusco, Rozzato and Concorezzese.

== Career ==
Gatta went on trial with Scottish side Livingston in 2001, but was not signed permanently
