= Alberto Leoncini Bartoli =

Italian diplomat (1932–2025)

Italian ambassador to Israel Ambassador of Italy to the Israel
- In office July 1987 – 1991
- Preceded by: Giovanni Dominedò
- Succeeded by: Pier Luigi Rachele

Italian ambassador to Egypt Ambassador of Italy to the Egypt
- In office 1993–1996
- Preceded by: Patrizio Schmidlin
- Succeeded by: Francesco Aloisi de Lardarel

Italian ambassador to the Holy See Ambassador of Italy to the Holy See
- In office 1997–1999
- Preceded by: Bruno Bottai
- Succeeded by: Raniero Avogadro

Ambassador of the Sovereign_Military_Order_of_Malta to the Holy See
- In office 2001–2016
- Preceded by: Stefan Falez
- Succeeded by: Antonio Zanardi Landi

Personal details
- Born: July 10, 1932 Ancona, Italy
- Died: November 2, 2025 (aged 93) Rome, Italy
- Education: Diploma laws Sapienza University of Rome
- Occupation: Diplomat

Alberto Leoncini Bartoli (July 10, 1932 – November 2, 2025) was an Italian diplomat.

== Career ==
In 1958 he joined the foreign service and was assigned first to the Economic Department and thereafter to the press service of the Ministry of Foreign Affairs. In 1960 he was appointed vice-consul in Berlin. From 1963 to 1967 he served first at the Italian Embassy in Vienna and thereafter in Sofia. From 1968 to 1971 he was appointed to the Press Service department in Rome. From 1972 to 1976 he was appointed councilor to the Italian Embassy in Bonn. From 1977 to 1980 he headed first the Comecon and thereafter the North Atlantic Council departments in Rome. In 1979 he was promoted Envoy Extraordinary and Minister Plenipotentiary. In 1981, he was appointed Minister Plenipotentiary to the Italian Embassy in Paris where in 1986 he was promoted first class special envoy and plenipotentiary. From July 1987 to 1990 he was appointed ambassador to Tel Aviv. From 1993 to 1996 he was appointed ambassador to Cairo. From 1996 to 1997 he was appointed chief of protocol of the Ministry of Foreign Affairs. From 1997 to 1999 he was appointed ambassador to the Holy See. From 1999 to 2000 he was appointed Secretary General for Internal Affairs of the Sovereign Military Order of Malta. From 2001 to 2016 he was appointed Ambassador of the Sovereign Military Order of Malta to the Holy See.

Bartoli died on November 2, 2025, at the age of 93.

== See also ==
- Ministry of Foreign Affairs (Italy)
- Foreign relations of Italy
