= Jacob Fano =

Hebrew poet

Jacob ben Joab Elijah da Fano was an Italian rabbi and Hebrew poet; he lived at Ferrara and Ancona about the middle of the sixteenth century. He was the teacher of Abraham Portaleone.

== Works ==
He wrote: "Shilṭe ha-Gibborim," a rhythmical poem warning men against women, and "Ḳinah," an elegy in verse on the persecution of the Jews at Ancona, published together at Ferrara, 1556; "Zoker ha-Berit," a treatise on the commandments, which formed the first part of his "Petaḥ Tiḳwah," no longer extant. He is generally supposed to have been the author of the "Ḳiẓẓur Ḥobot ha-Lebabot," Venice, 1655, a compendium of Baḥya's "Ḥobot ha-Lebabot."
