= Ancona =

City and seaport in Marche, Italy

- Comune
- Città di Ancona
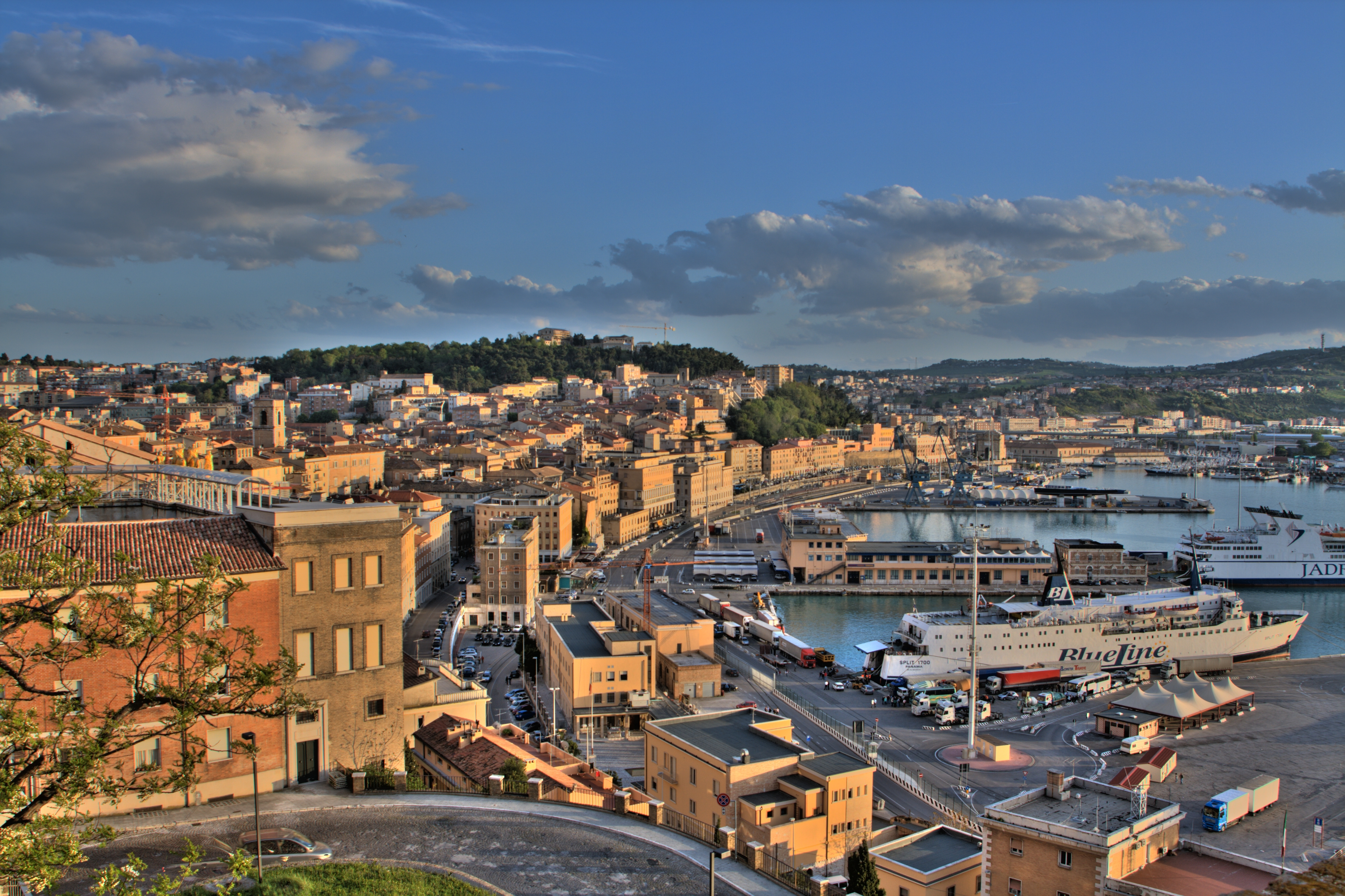
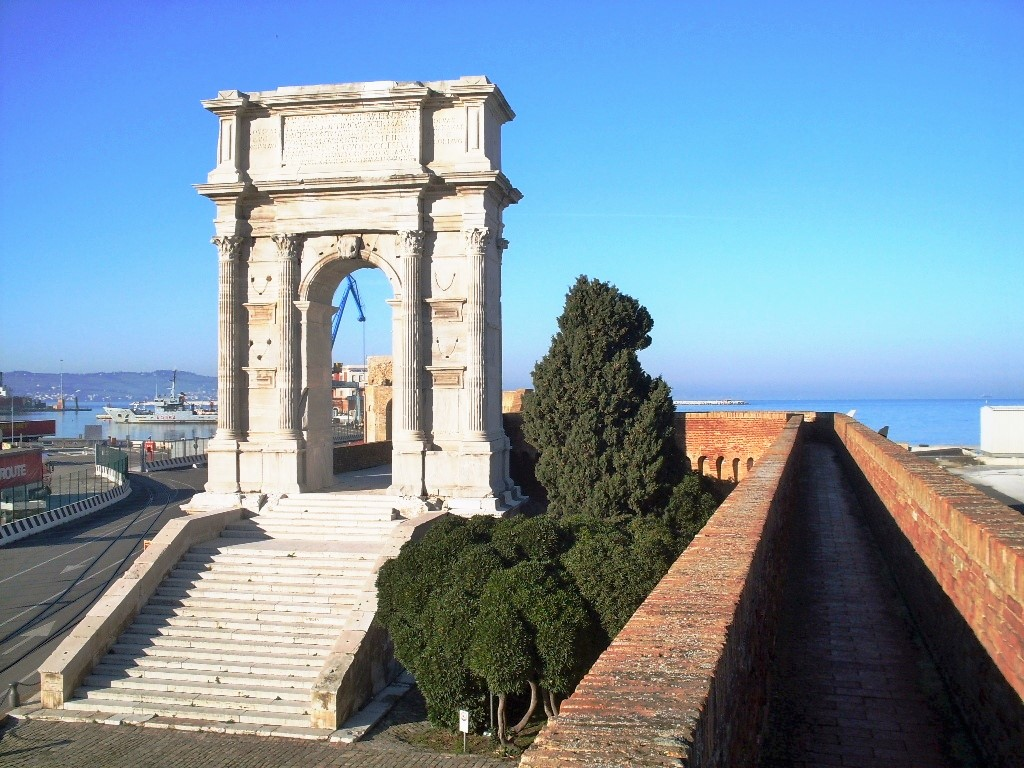
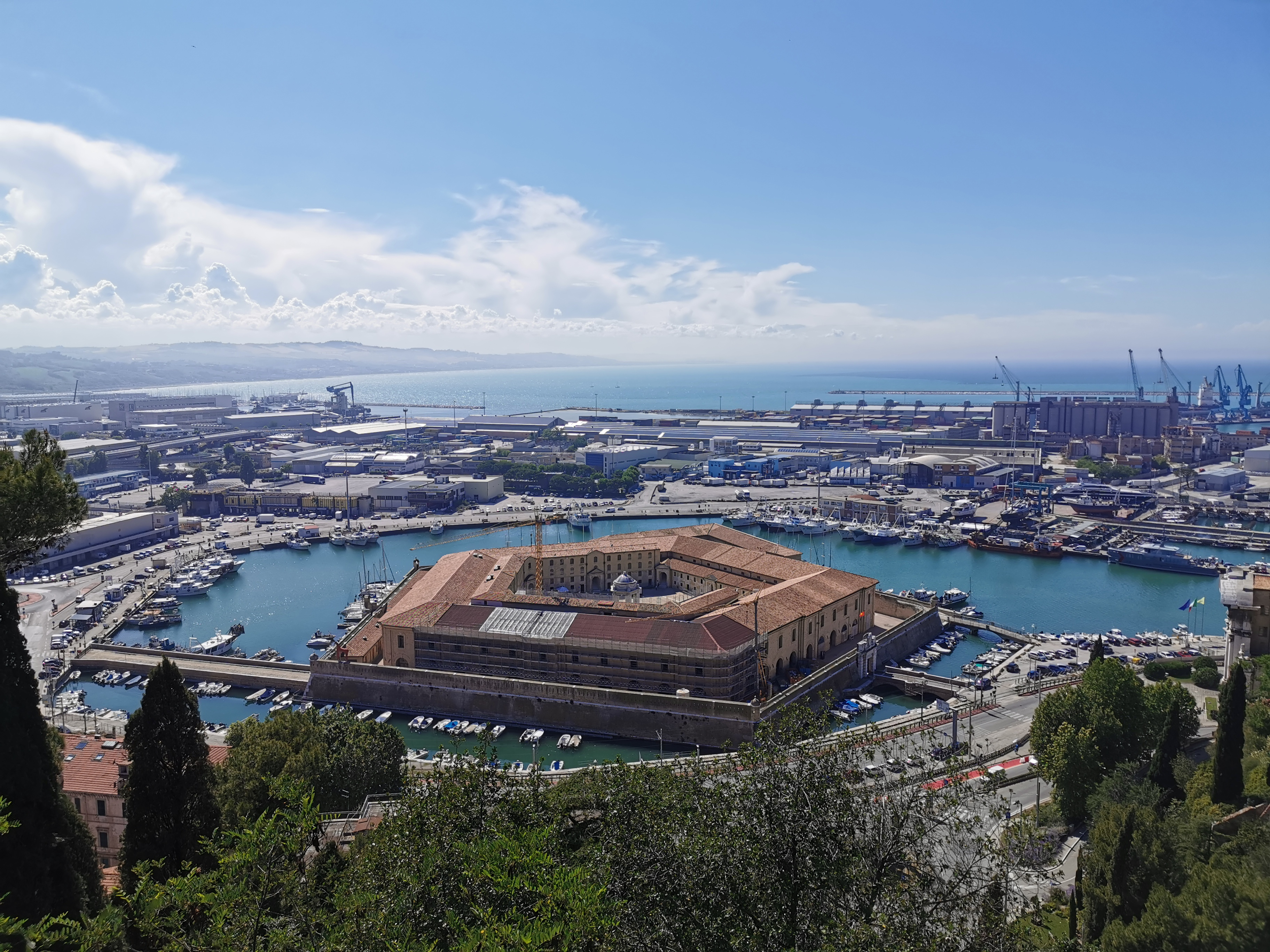
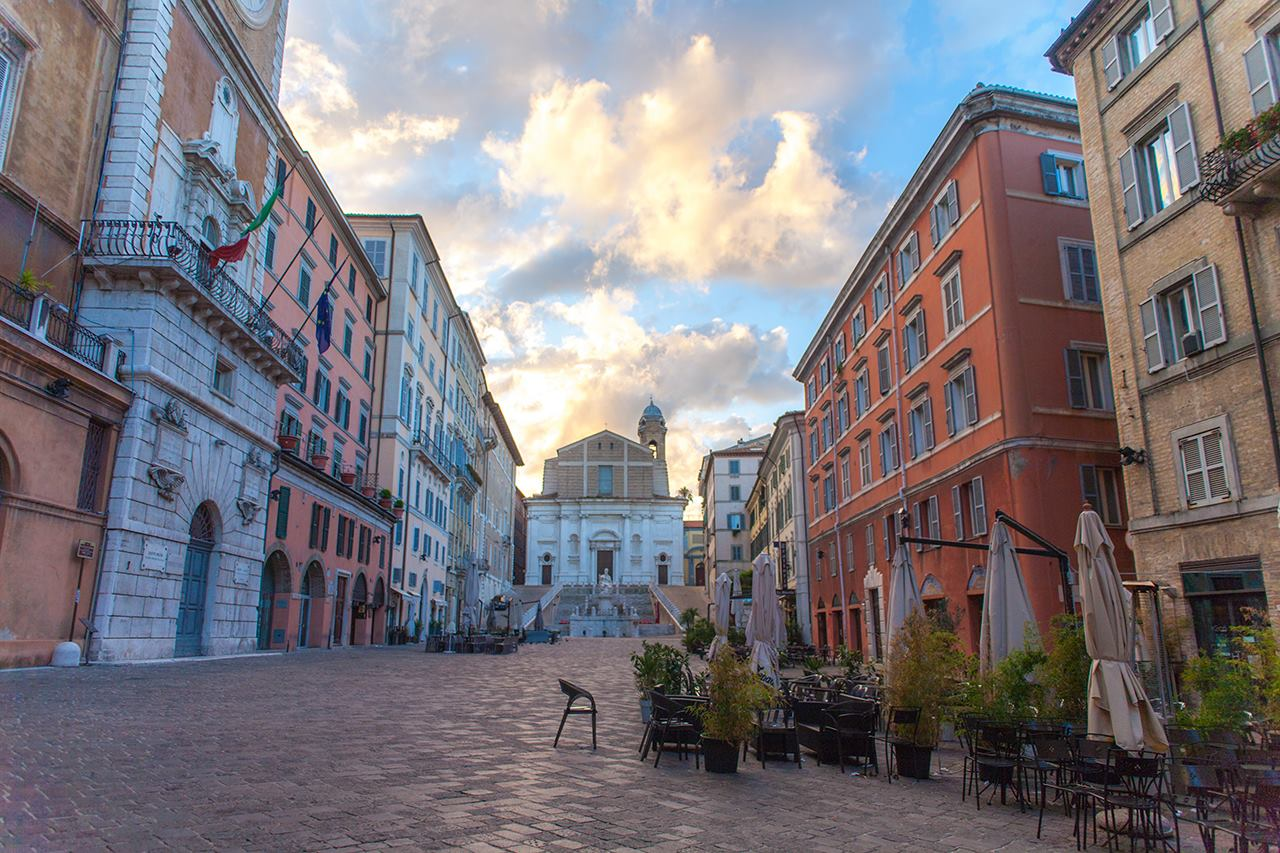
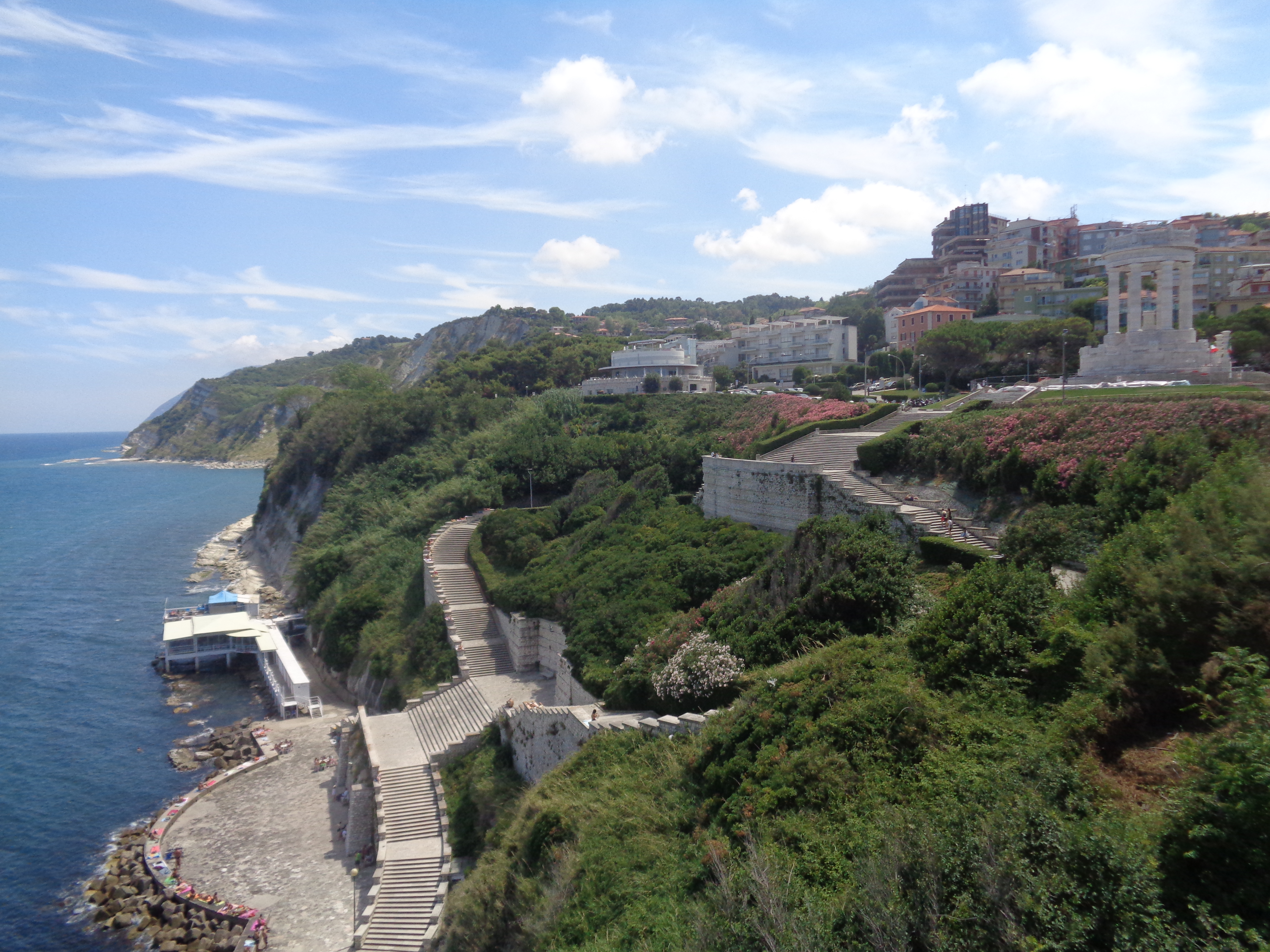
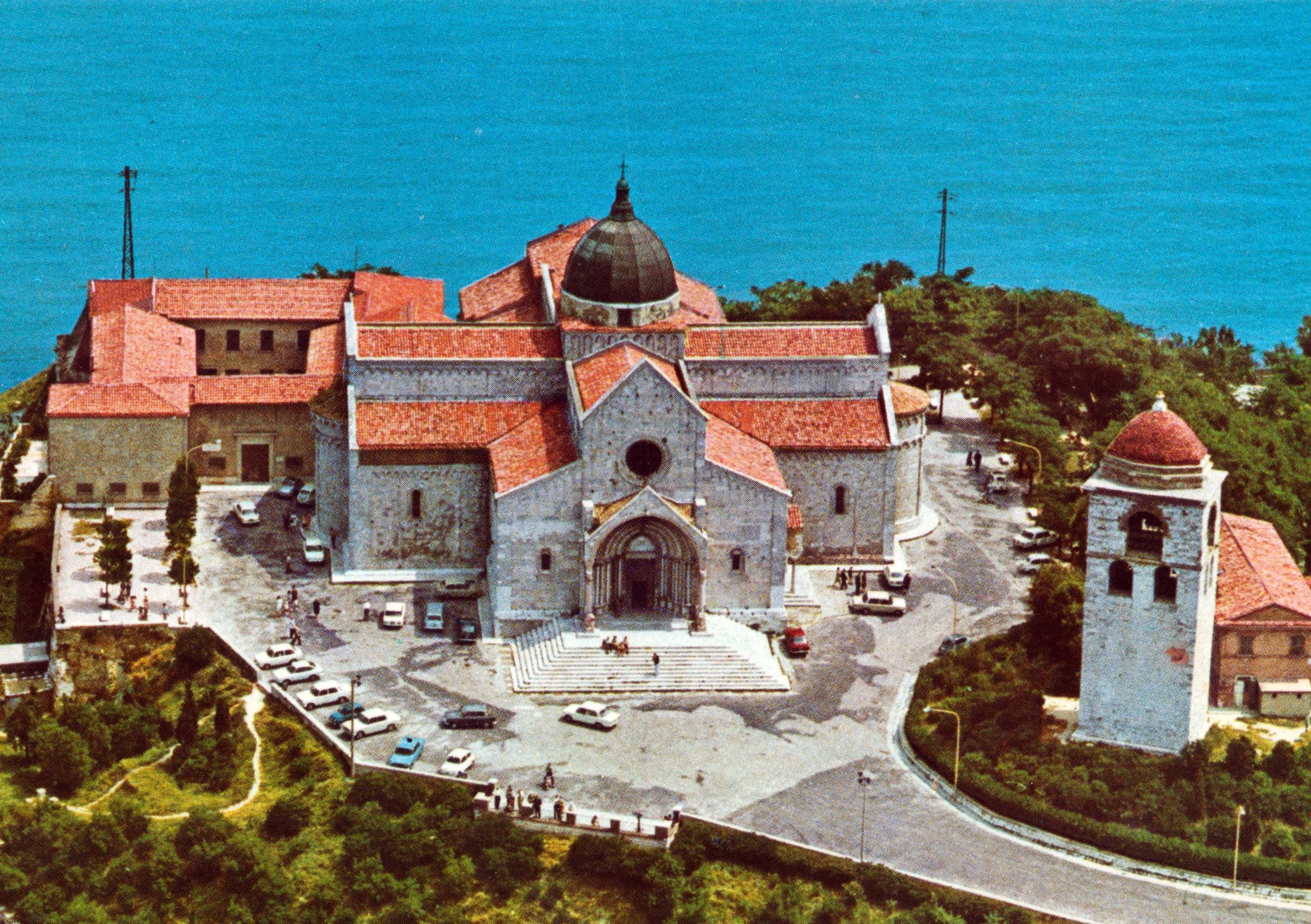
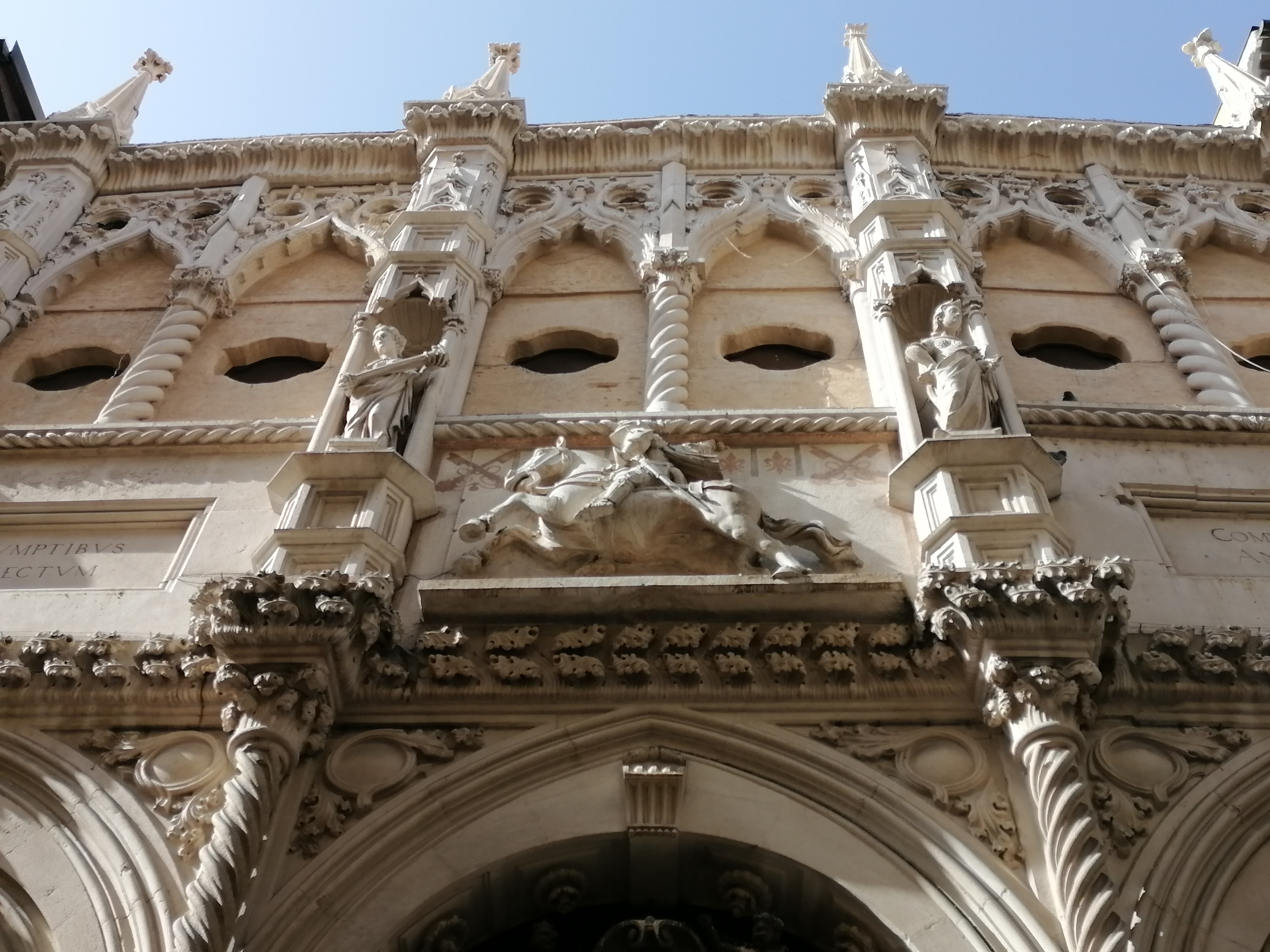
- Clockwise from top: view of the city, Lazzaretto of Ancona, Scalinata del Passetto and Piazza IV Novembre with the Monument to the Fallen, Loggia dei Mercanti, San Ciriaco Cathedral, Piazza del Plebiscito (Piazza del Papa), the Arch of Trajan

- Flag Coat of arms

- Location within Marche
- Coordinates: 43°37′01″N 13°31′00″E
- Country: Italy
- Region: Marche
- Province: Ancona (AN)
- Frazioni: Aspio, Gallignano, Montacuto, Massignano, Montesicuro, Candia, Ghettarello, Paterno, Casine di Paterno, Poggio di Ancona, Sappanico, Varano

Government
  - Mayor: Daniele Silvetti (FI)

Area
  - Total: 124.84 km^{2} (48.20 sq mi)
- Elevation: 16 m (52 ft)

Population (2026)
  - Total: 100,151
  - Density: 802.23/km^{2} (2,077.8/sq mi)
- Demonyms: Anconetani, Anconitani
- Time zone: UTC+1 (CET)
  - Summer (DST): UTC+2 (CEST)
- Postal code: 60100, 60121–60129, 60131
- Dialing code: 071
- Patron saint: Judas Cyriacus
- Saint day: 4 May
- Website: Official website

Ancona (/æŋˈkoʊnə/, also US: /ænˈ-, ɑːnˈ-/; Italian: [aŋˈkoːna]) is a city, seaport and comune (municipality) in the region of Marche in central Italy. It is the capital of the homonymous province and of the region, and with a population of 100,151 as of 2026, also the largest city in the region and the 45th-largest city in Italy. The city is located 280 km (170 mi) northeast of Rome, on the Adriatic Sea, between the slopes of the two extremities of the promontory of Monte Conero, Monte Astagno, and Monte Guasco. The hilly nature around Ancona is a strong contrast to the flatter coastline in areas further north.

Ancona is one of the main ports on the Adriatic Sea, especially for passenger traffic, and is the main economic and demographic centre of the region.

As a result of Ancona's elbow shape facing the sea, Ancona is one of the few cities in the world and the only city in Italy where it is possible to see both sunrise and sunset over the sea.

== History ==
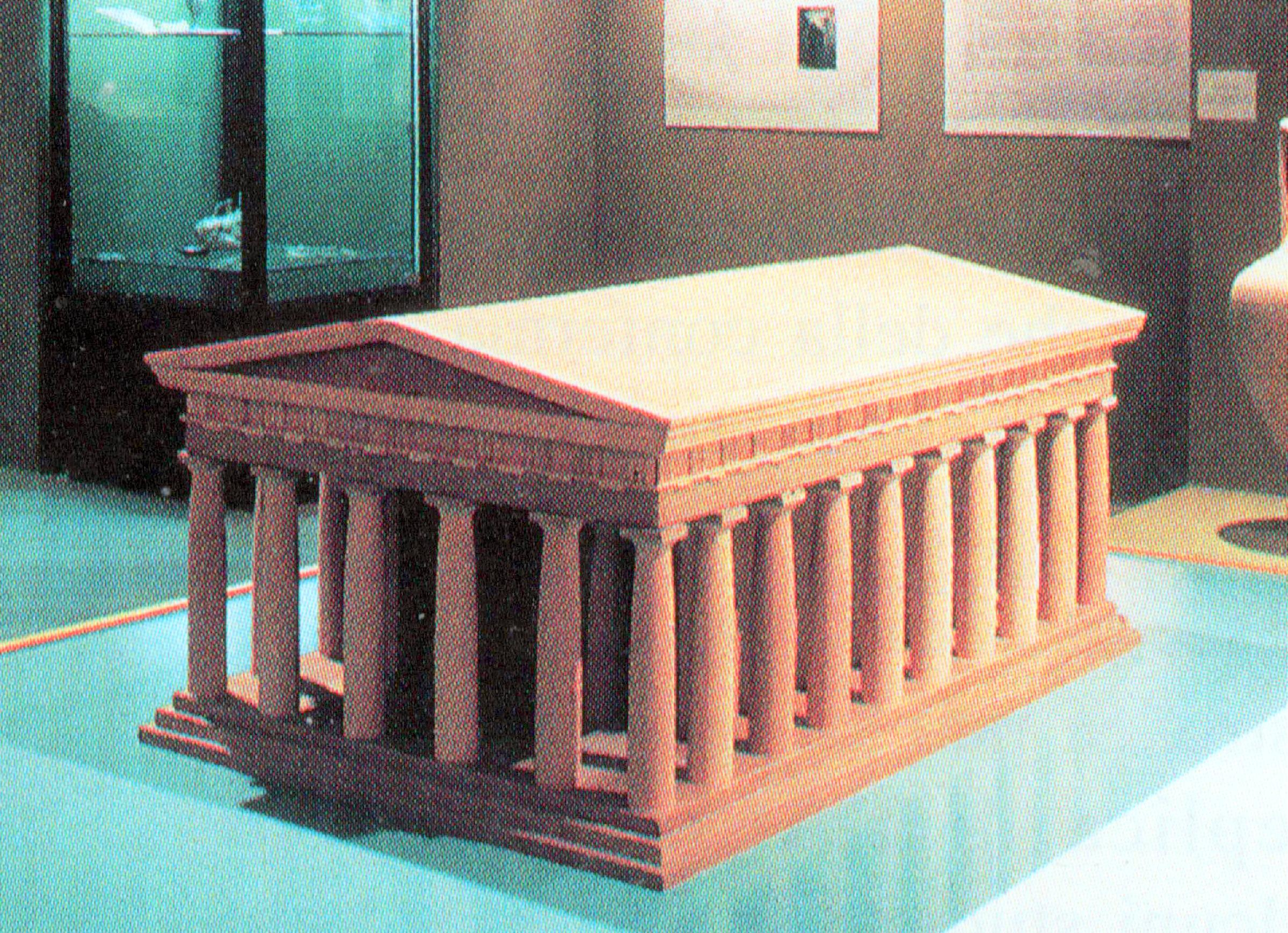
Model of the Temple of Aphrodite, on the acropolis of Ankón

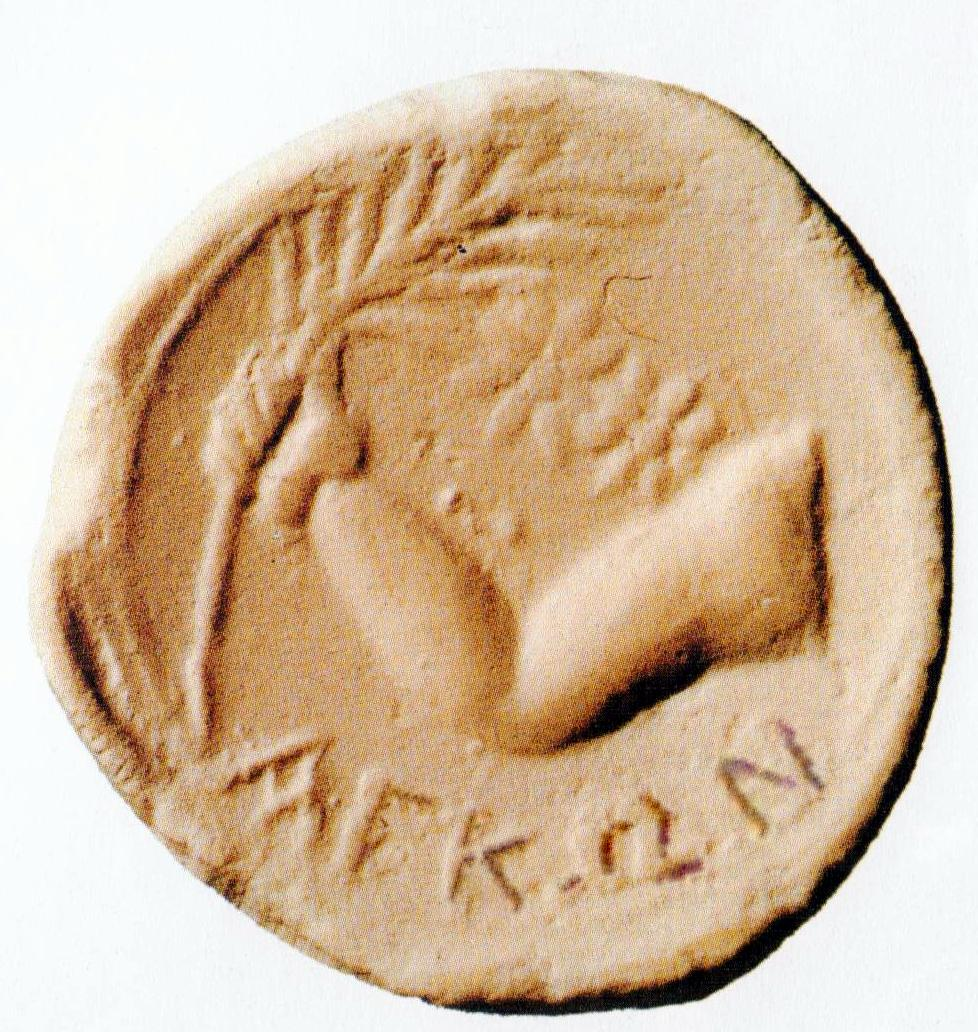
Greek coin of Ankón

=== Greek colony ===
Before the Greek colonization, the territory was occupied by separated communities of the Picentes tribes.

Ancona took a more urban shape by Greek settlers from Syracuse in about 387 BC, who gave it its name: Ankṓn, then Ancona. This toponym stems from the Ancient Greek word ἀγκών (ankṓn), meaning "elbow" or "bend"; the harbour to the east of the town was originally protected only by the promontory on the north, shaped like an elbow. Greek merchants established a Tyrian purple dye factory here.

The acropolis, with the temple of Aphrodite, was located on the top of the Guasco hill, on the site where the Ancona Cathedral stands today. Another temple, dedicated to Diomedes, stood on the seashore, at the end of the city's promontory. Diomedes was considered the mythical oikistes of the colony.

Ankón had its own coinage with the punning device of the bent arm holding a myrtle sprig and the Gemini constellation, reference to the Dioscuri, protectors of sailors. On the reverse was the head of Aphrodite, goddess of good navigation.

Ancona is still called the "Doric city" and the inhabitants are referred to as "Dorici", because it was a colony of Syracuse, which in turn was a colony founded by the Dorians of Corinth.

=== Roman municipium ===
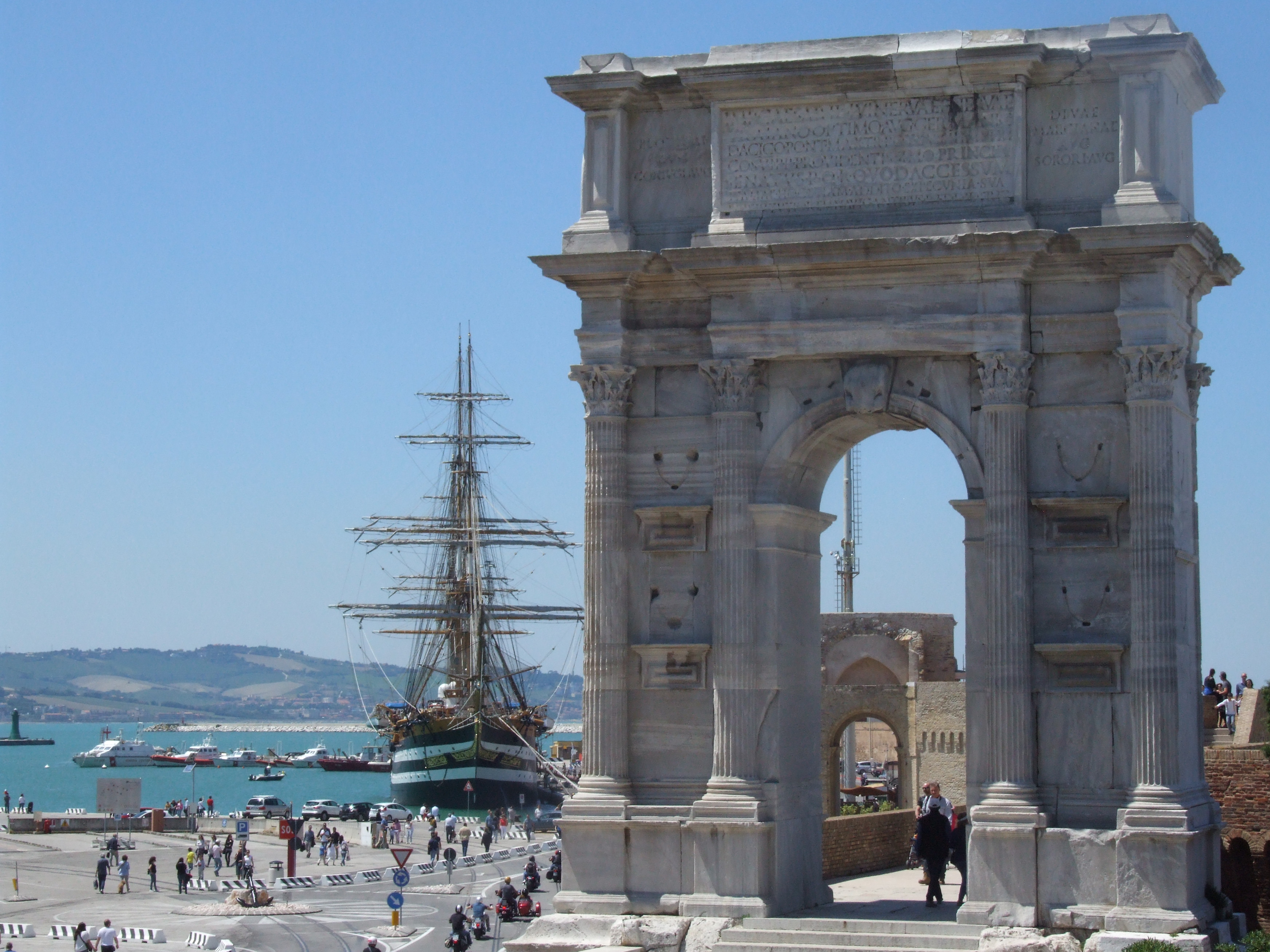
Arch of Trajan

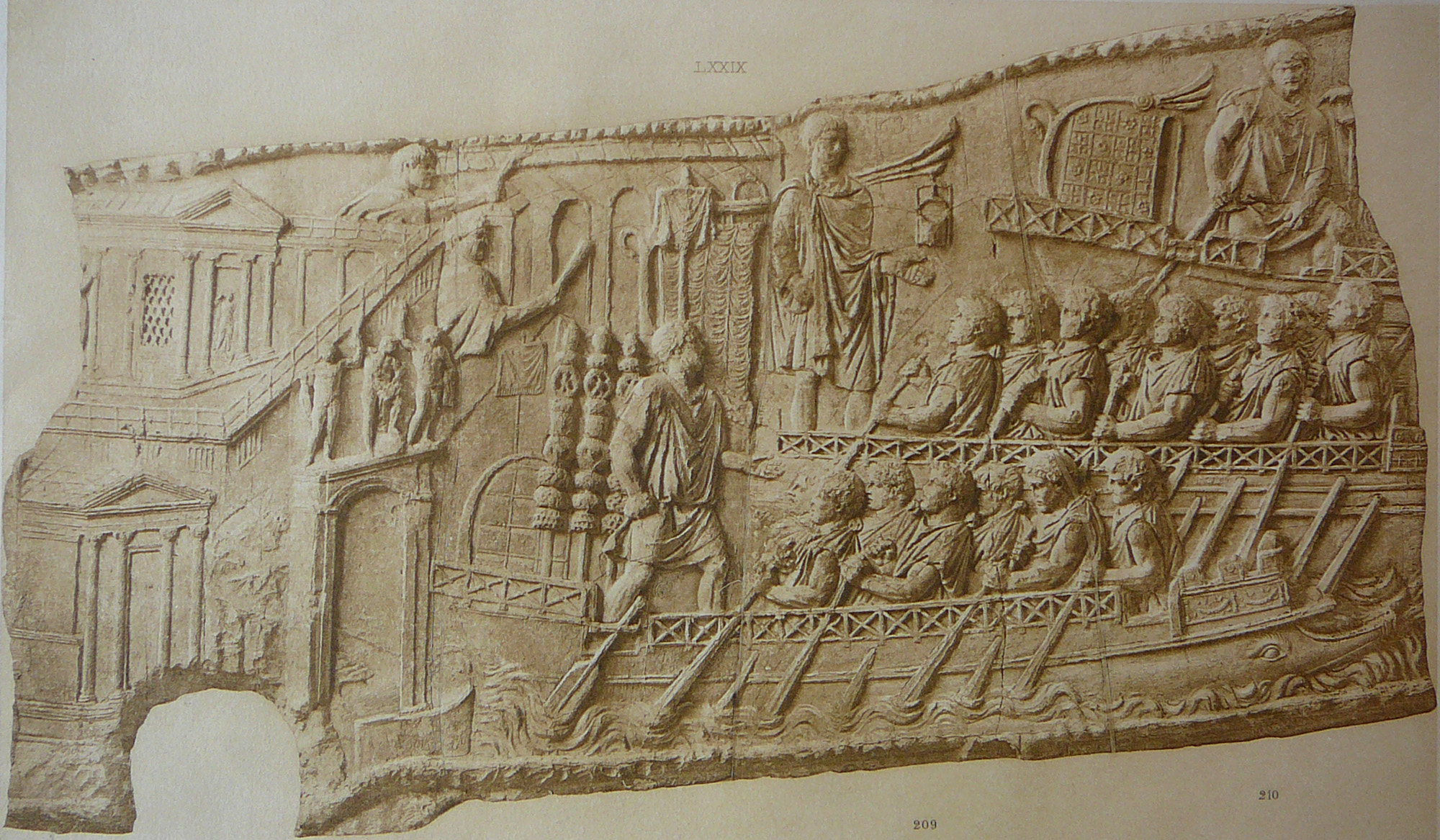
Ancona and the Arch of Trajan depicted in Trajan's Column in Rome.

In Roman times Ankón continued the use of the Greek language and kept its own coinage for about a century.

When it became a Roman town is uncertain. It was a naval station in the Illyrian War of 178 BC. Julius Caesar took possession of it immediately after crossing the Rubicon.

Its harbour was of considerable importance in imperial times, as the nearest to Dalmatia, and was enlarged by Trajan, who constructed the north quay with his architect Apollodorus of Damascus. At the beginning of it stands the marble triumphal arch, the Arch of Trajan with a single archway, and without bas-reliefs, erected in his honour in 115 by the Senate and Roman people., to honor the emperor who had made "the entrance to Italy safer" (tutiorem accessum Italiae), as can be read in the inscription on the arch.

Ancona and the Arch of Trajan are depicted in Trajan's Column, with the imperial fleet departing for the Second Dacian War and Trajan haranguing his soldiers.

=== Byzantine city ===
Ancona was attacked successively by the Goths and Lombards between the 3rd and 5th centuries, but recovered its strength and importance. It was one of the cities of the Pentapolis of the Exarchate of Ravenna, a lordship of the Byzantine Empire, in the 7th and 8th centuries. In 840, Saracen raiders sacked and burned the city. After Charlemagne's conquest of northern Italy, it became the capital of the Marca di Ancona, whence the name of the modern region derives.

=== Maritime Republic of Ancona ===
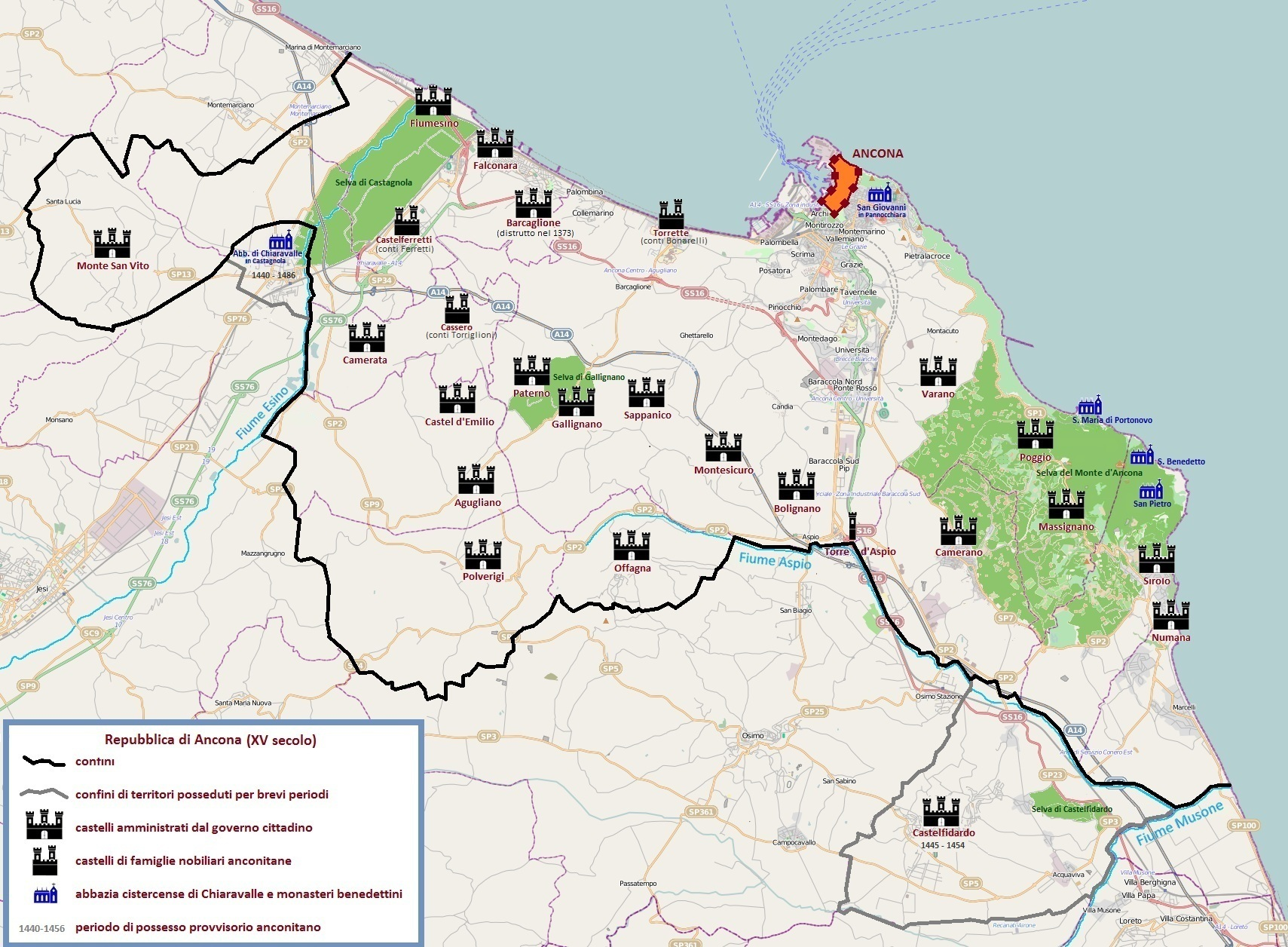
Borders and castles of the Republic of Ancona in the 15th century

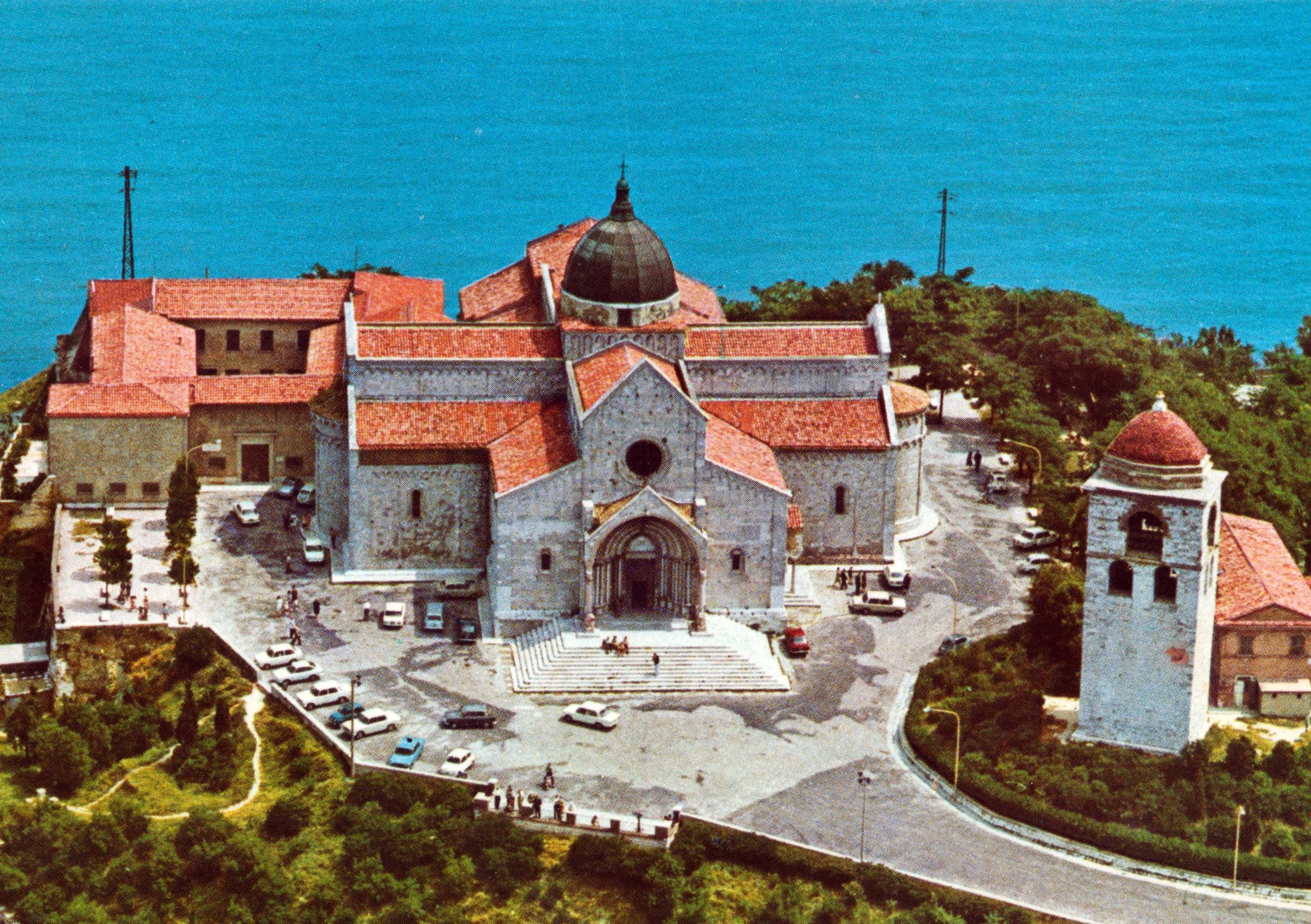
Cathedral of Ancona (12nd century)

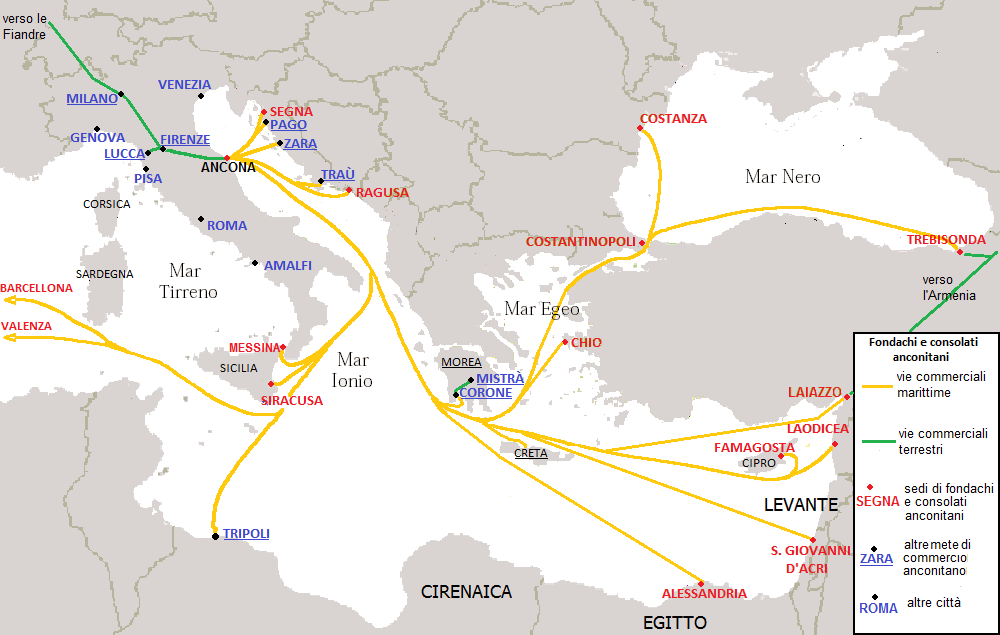
Trade routes and warehouses of the maritime republic of Ancona

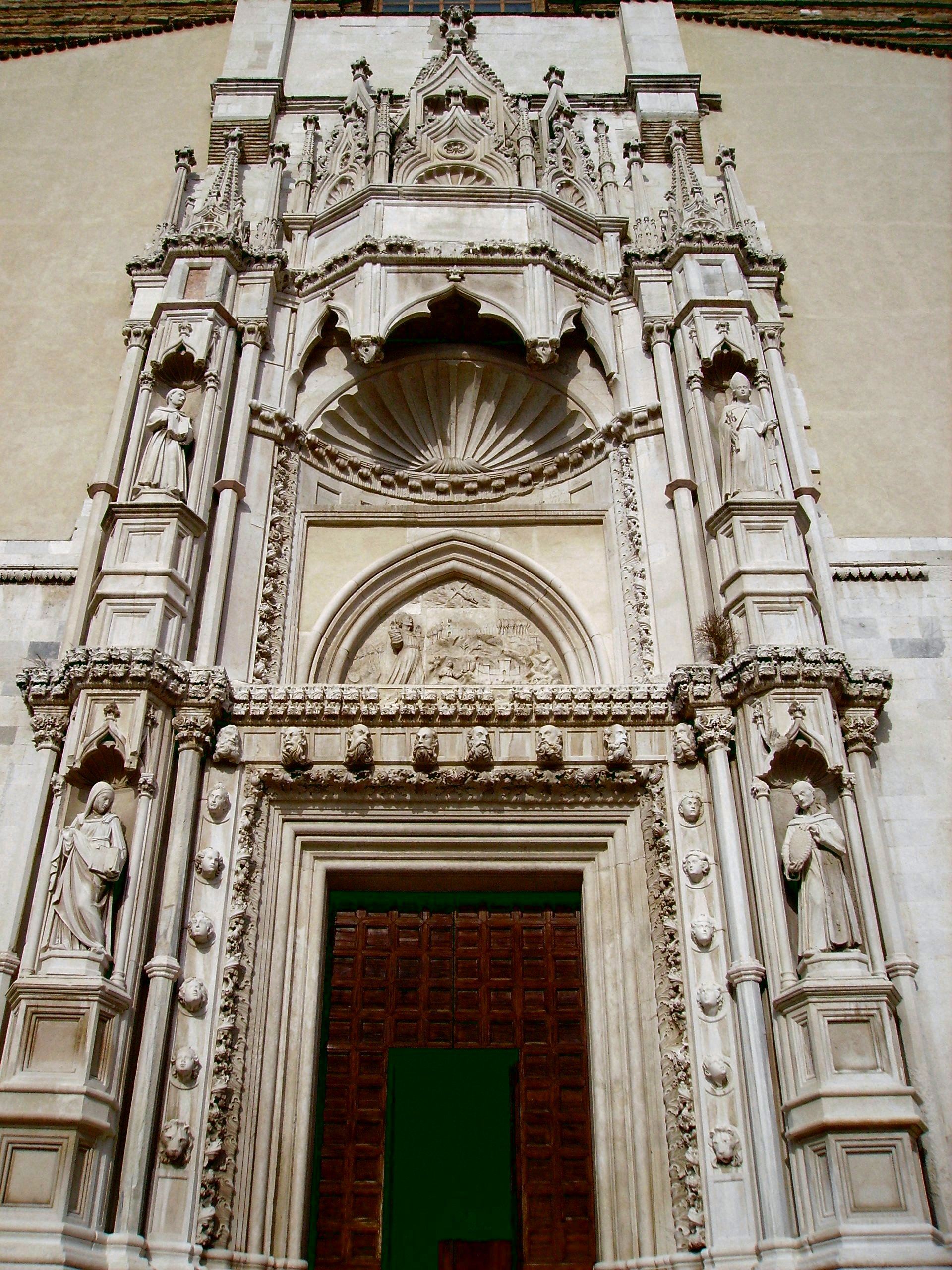
The portal of the church of San Francesco alle Scale (1454)

After 1000, Ancona became increasingly independent, eventually turning into an important maritime republic (together with Gaeta and Ragusa, it is one of those not appearing on the Italian naval flag), often clashing against the nearby power of Venice. An oligarchic republic, Ancona was ruled by six Elders, elected by the three terzieri into which the city was divided: S. Pietro, Porto and Capodimonte. It had a coin of its own, the agontano, and a series of laws known as Statuti del mare e del Terzenale and Statuti della Dogana. Ancona was usually allied with the Republic of Ragusa and the Byzantine Empire.

In 1137, 1167, and 1174 it was strong enough to push back the forces of the Holy Roman Empire. Anconitan ships took part in the Crusades, and their navigators included Cyriac of Ancona. In the struggle between the Popes and the Holy Roman Emperors that troubled Northern and central Italy from the 12th century onwards, Ancona sided with the Popes (Guelphs).

Unlike other cities of northern Italy, Ancona never became a signoria. The sole exception was the rule of the Malatesta, who took the city in 1348, taking advantage of the black death and of a fire that had destroyed many of the city's important buildings. The Malatesta were ousted in 1383. In 1532, Ancona definitively lost its freedom and became part of the Papal States, under Pope Clement VII. The symbol of the new papal authority was the massive Citadel.

=== In the Papal States ===
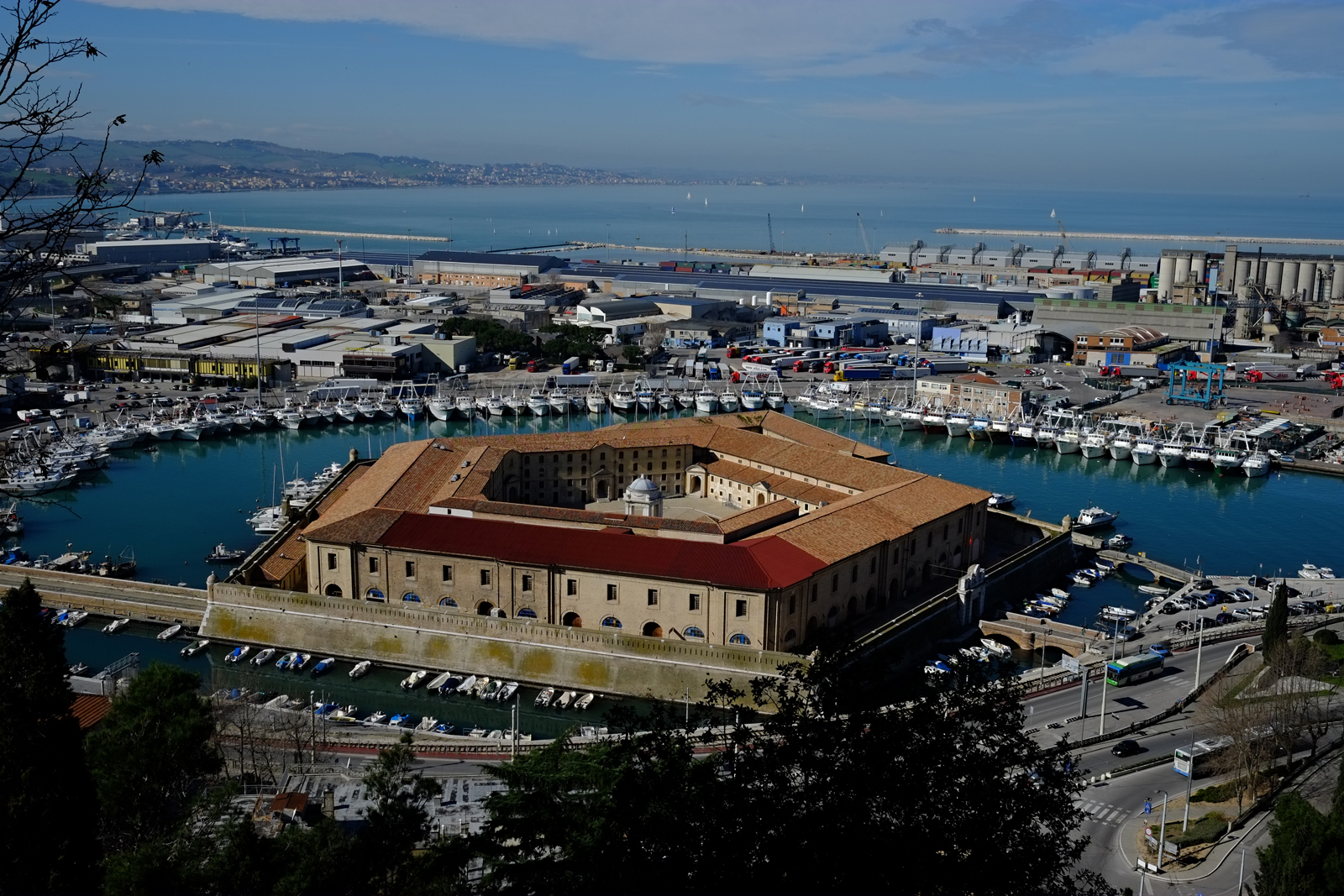
Vanvitelli's Lazzaretto

Pope Paul IV commanded the execution and burning of Converso merchants in Ancona for returning to Judaism. Later, Ancona, along with Rome and Avignon in southern France, was one of the three cities in the Papal States where Jews were permitted to remain after Pope Pius V ordered their banishment in 1569. They lived in the ghetto that had been established in Ancona in 1556.

From the Reformation to the Napoleonic invasions, the city was effectively governed by a civic nobility, an urban patriciate that enjoyed broad jurisdictional autonomy over local justice and administration.

In 1733, Pope Clement XII extended the quay, and an inferior imitation of Trajan's arch was set up; he also erected the Lazzaretto of Ancona at the south end of the harbour, Luigi Vanvitelli being the architect-in-chief. The southern quay was built in 1880, and the harbour was protected by forts on the heights. From 1797 onwards, when the French took it, it frequently appears in history as an important fortress.

In 1832, French Expedition to Ancona occupied the city, remaining until 1838 when they and the Austrians in Bologna mutually agreed to withdraw.

==== The Greek community of Ancona ====
Ancona, as well as Venice, became a very important destination for merchants from the Ottoman Empire during the 16th century. The Greeks formed the largest of the communities of foreign merchants. They were refugees from former Byzantine or Venetian territories that were occupied by the Ottomans in the late 15th and 16th centuries. The first Greek community was established in Ancona early in the 16th century.

=== Contemporary history ===
Ancona entered the Kingdom of Italy when Christophe Léon Louis Juchault de Lamoricière surrendered here on 29 September 1860 following a brief siege, eleven days after his defeat at Castelfidardo.

On 23 May 1915, Italy entered World War I and joined the Entente Powers. In 1915, following Italy's entry, the battleship division of the Austro-Hungarian Navy carried out extensive bombardments causing great damage to all installations and killing several dozen people. Ancona was one of the most important Italian ports on the Adriatic Sea during the Great War.

During World War II, the city was taken by the Polish 2nd Corps against Nazi German forces, as Free Polish forces were serving as part of the British Army. Poles were tasked with capture of the city on 16 June 1944 and accomplished the task a month later on 18 July 1944 in what is known as the battle of Ancona. The attack was part of an Allied operation to gain access to a seaport closer to the Gothic Line in order to shorten their lines of communication for the advance into northern Italy.

Queen Elizabeth II and Prince Philip of Great Britain visited Ancona in May 1961 as part of their tour of Italy.

=== Jewish history ===
Jews according to documents began living in Ancona in 967 AD, even though there is evidence they lived there even before. It has been claimed that in 1270, a Jewish resident of Ancona, Jacob of Ancona, travelled to China, four years before Marco Polo, and documented his impressions in a book called "The City of Lights". From 1300 and on, the Jewish community of Ancona grew steadily, most due to the city importance and it being a center of trade with the Levant. In that year, Jewish poet Immanuel the Roman tried to lower high taxation taken from the Jewish community of the city. Over the next 200 years, Jews from Germany, Spain, Sicily and Portugal immigrated to Ancona, due to persecutions in their homeland and thanks to the pro-Jewish attitude taken towards Ancona Jews due to their importance in the trade and banking business, making Ancona a trade center.

In 1555, pope Paul IV forced the Crypto-Jewish community of the city to convert to Christianity, as part of his Papal Bull of 1555. While some did, others refused to do so and thus were hanged and then burnt in the town square. In response, Jewish merchants boycotted Ancona for a short while. The boycott was led by Dona Gracia Mendes Nasi.

Though emancipated by Napoleon I for several years, in 1843 Pope Gregory XVI revived an old decree, forbidding Jews from living outside the ghetto, wearing identification sign on their clothes and other religious and financial restrictions. Public opinion did not approve of these restrictions, and they were cancelled a short while after.

The Jews of Ancona received full emancipation in 1848 with the election of Pope Pius IX. In 1938, 1177 lived in Ancona; 53 Jews were sent away to Germany, 15 of them survived and returned to the town after World War II. The majority of the Jewish community stayed in town or emigrated due to high ransoms paid to the fascist regime. In 2004, about 200 Jews lived in Ancona.

Two synagogues and two cemeteries still exist in the city. The ancient Monte-Cardeto cemetery is one of the biggest Jewish cemeteries in Europe and tombstones are dated to 1552 and on. It can still be visited and it resides within the Parco del Cardeto.

== Geography ==
=== Climate ===
The climate of Ancona is humid subtropical (Cfa in the Köppen climate classification) and the city lies on the border between mediterranean and more continental regions. Precipitations are regular throughout the year. Winters are cool (January mean temp. 5 °C or 41 °F), with frequent rain and fog. Temperatures can reach −10 °C (14 °F) or even lower values outside the city centre during the most intense cold waves. Snow is not unusual with air masses coming from Northern Europe or from the Balkans and Russia, and can be heavy at times (also due to the "Adriatic Sea effect"), especially in the hills surrounding the city centre. Summers are usually warm and humid (July mean temp. 22.5 °C or 72.5 °F). Highs sometimes can reach values around 35 and 40 °C (95 and 104 °F), especially if the wind is blowing from the south or from the west (föhn effect off the Apennine Mountains). Thunderstorms are quite common, particularly in August and September, and can be intense with occasional flash floods, damaging winds and even large hail. Spring and autumn are both seasons with changeable weather, but generally mild. Extremes in temperature have been −15.4 °C (4.3 °F) (in 1967) and 40.8 °C (105.4 °F) (in 1968) / 40.5 °C (104.9 °F) (in 1983).

Climate data for Ancona (1991–2020)
Month	Jan	Feb	Mar	Apr	May	Jun	Jul	Aug	Sep	Oct	Nov	Dec	Year
Mean daily maximum °C (°F)	10.1 (50.2)	11.5 (52.7)	15.0 (59.0)	18.5 (65.3)	23.0 (73.4)	27.3 (81.1)	29.6 (85.3)	29.6 (85.3)	25.4 (77.7)	20.7 (69.3)	15.5 (59.9)	11.2 (52.2)	19.8 (67.6)
Daily mean °C (°F)	7.3 (45.1)	8.2 (46.8)	11.3 (52.3)	14.6 (58.3)	19.0 (66.2)	23.1 (73.6)	25.6 (78.1)	25.7 (78.3)	21.5 (70.7)	17.4 (63.3)	12.6 (54.7)	8.4 (47.1)	16.2 (61.2)
Mean daily minimum °C (°F)	4.4 (39.9)	4.9 (40.8)	7.6 (45.7)	10.6 (51.1)	15.0 (59.0)	19.0 (66.2)	21.5 (70.7)	21.8 (71.2)	17.7 (63.9)	14.0 (57.2)	9.7 (49.5)	5.5 (41.9)	12.6 (54.8)
Average precipitation mm (inches)	47.0 (1.85)	54.7 (2.15)	59.4 (2.34)	54.1 (2.13)	55.9 (2.20)	52.0 (2.05)	35.2 (1.39)	38.5 (1.52)	85.8 (3.38)	68.5 (2.70)	87.0 (3.43)	71.0 (2.80)	709.1 (27.94)
Average precipitation days (≥ 1.0 mm)	7.1	6.8	6.4	6.8	6.6	5.0	3.5	3.8	6.8	7.6	9.3	8.4	78.1
Source: Istituto Superiore per la Protezione e la Ricerca Ambientale

== Demographics ==
Historical population
Year	Pop.	±%
1174	11,000	—
1565	18,435	+67.6%
1582	27,770	+50.6%
1656	17,033	−38.7%
1701	16,212	−4.8%
1708	16,194	−0.1%
1769	23,028	+42.2%
1809	31,231	+35.6%
1816	32,636	+4.5%
1828	36,816	+12.8%
1844	43,217	+17.4%
1846	43,953	+1.7%
1853	44,833	+2.0%
1861	47,230	+5.3%
1871	45,681	−3.3%
1881	48,888	+7.0%
1901	58,602	+19.9%
1911	65,388	+11.6%
1921	68,521	+4.8%
1931	75,372	+10.0%
1936	78,639	+4.3%
1951	85,763	+9.1%
1961	100,485	+17.2%
1971	109,789	+9.3%
1981	106,498	−3.0%
1991	101,285	−4.9%
2001	100,507	−0.8%
2011	100,497	−0.0%
2021	98,402	−2.1%
Source: P. Burattini. Stradario – Guida della città di Ancona (Ancona, 1951), ISTAT

As of 2026, the population is 100,151, of which 49.5% are males, and 50.5% are females. Minors make up 13.7% of the population, and seniors make up 26.8%.

=== Immigration ===
As of 2025, immigrants make up 18.8% of the population. The 5 largest foreign countries of birth are Bangladesh, Albania, Romania, Peru, and Ukraine.

== Sights ==
=== Ancona Cathedral ===
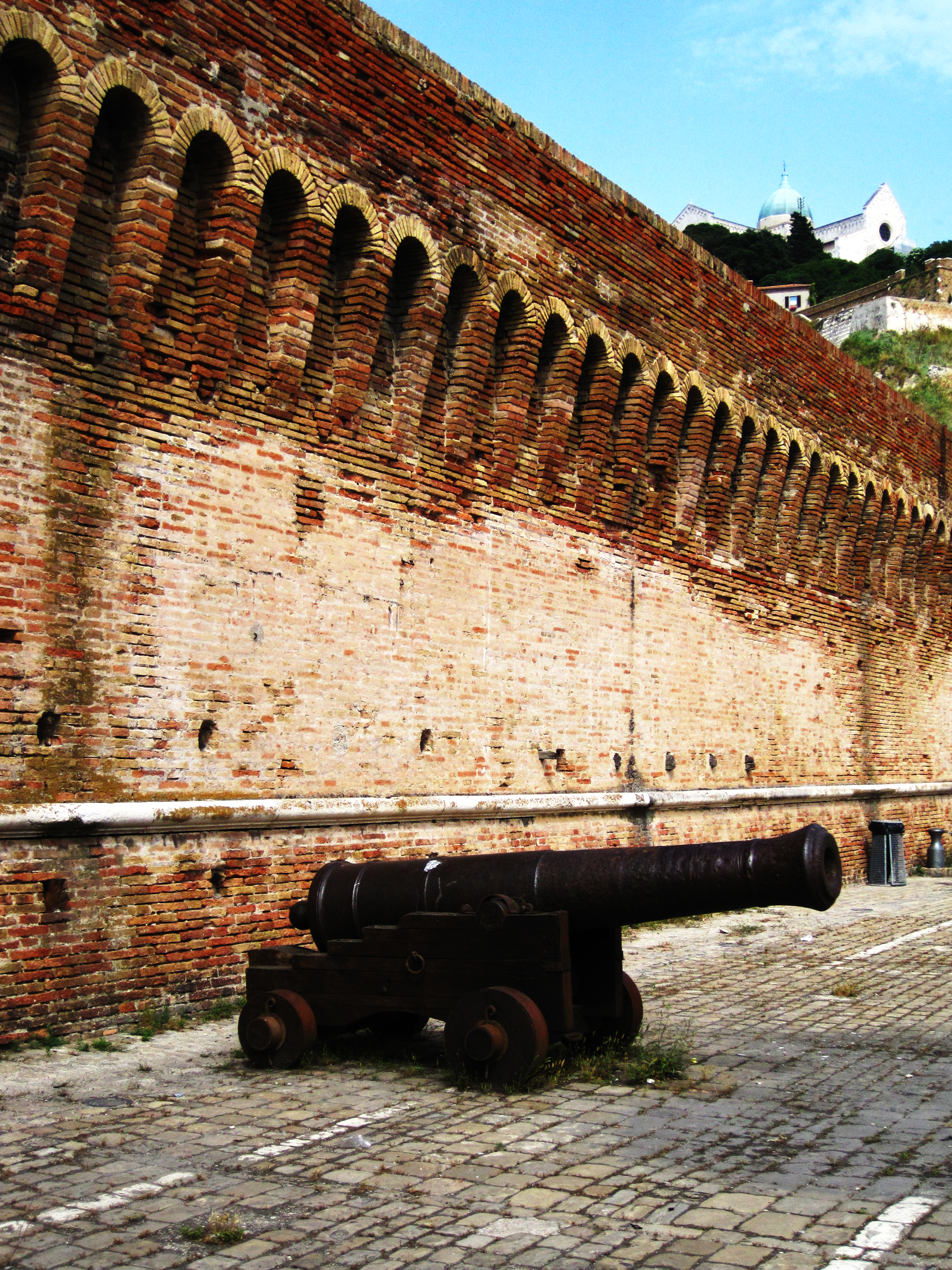
A cannon situated near the Arch of Trajan, with the Ancona Cathedral in the background

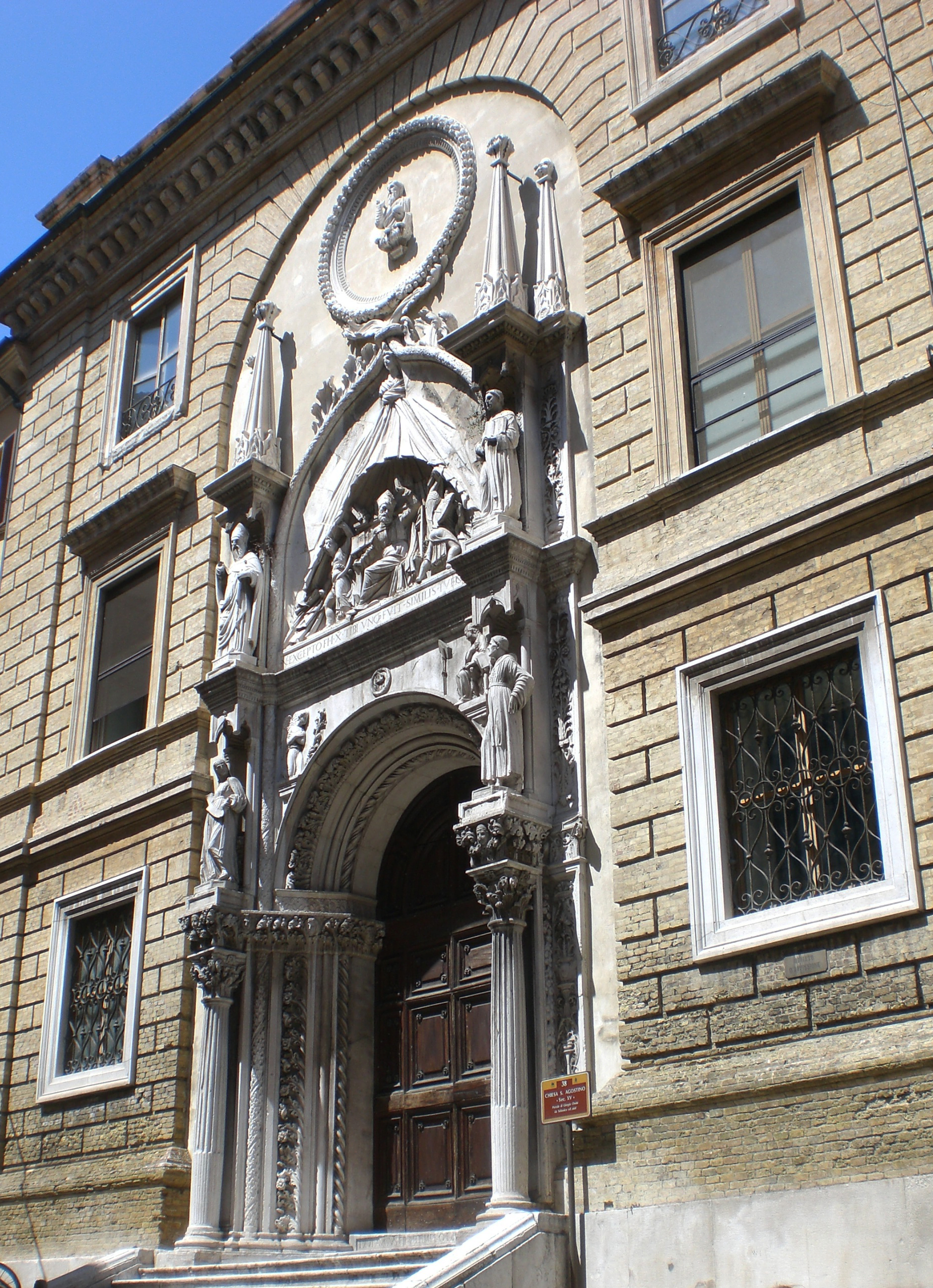
Renaissance Gothic door of the church of Sant'Agostino

Ancona Cathedral, dedicated to Judas Cyriacus, was consecrated at the beginning of the 11th century and completed in 1189. Some writers suppose that the original church was in the form of a basilica and belonged to the 7th century. An early restoration was completed in 1234. It is a fine Romanesque building in grey stone, built in the form of a Greek cross, and other elements of Byzantine art. It has a dodecagonal dome over the centre slightly altered by Margaritone d'Arezzo in 1270. The façade has a Gothic portal, ascribed to Giorgio da Como (1228), which was intended to have a lateral arch on each side. The interior, which has a crypt under each transept, in the main preserves its original character. It has ten columns which are attributed to the temple of Venus. The church was restored in the 1980s.

=== Arch of Trajan ===
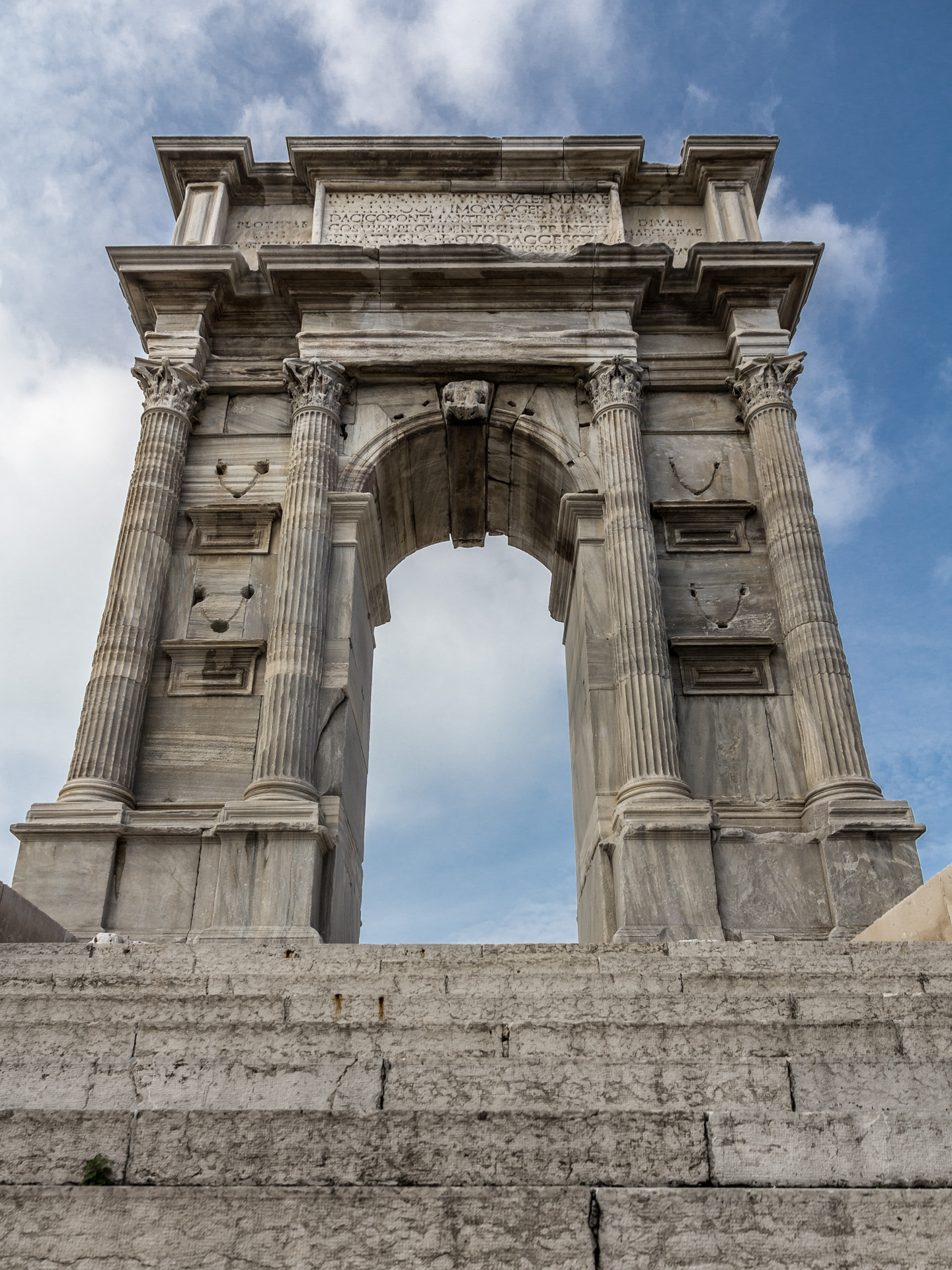
Arch of Trajan

The Arch of Trajan is a marble structure 18 metres (59 feet) high, but only 3 metres (9.8 feet) wide, standing on a high platform approached by a wide flight of steps, and is one of the finest surviving Roman monuments in the Marches. It was built in the year 114/115 as an entrance to the causeway atop the harbour wall and is named in honour of Trajan, the emperor who made the harbour. Most of its original bronze ornaments have disappeared. The archway is flanked by pairs of fluted Corinthian columns on pedestals. A pediment bears inscriptions. The format is that of the Arch of Titus in Rome, but made taller, so that the bronze figures surmounting it, of Trajan, his wife Plotina and sister Marciana, would figure as a landmark for ships approaching Rome's greatest Adriatic port.

=== Other sights ===
- Lazzaretto: the complex was planned by architect Luigi Vanvitelli in 1732 as a pentagonal building built on an artificial island, also pentagonal, as a quarantine station; it covers more than 20,000 square metres (220,000 square feet), built to protect the city from the risk of contagious diseases eventually reaching the town with the ships. Later it was used also as a military hospital or as barracks; it is currently used for cultural exhibits.
- The Episcopal Palace was the place where Pope Pius II died in 1464.
- Santa Maria della Piazza: medieval romanesque church with an elaborate arcaded façade (1210).
- Palazzo del Comune (or Palazzo degli Anziani – Elders palace); it was built in 1250, with lofty arched substructures at the back, was gotic work of Margaritone d'Arezzo.
- the Palazzo del Governo (now prefecture), Renaissance work of Francesco di Giorgio Martini.
- Santi Pellegrino e Teresa: 18th century church.
- Santissimo Sacramento: 16th and 18th century church.

There are also several buildings by Giorgio da Sebenico, combining Gothic and Renaissance elements: the Palazzo Benincasa, the Loggia dei Mercanti, the Franciscan church of San Francesco alle Scale and Sant'Agostino, Augustinian church with statues portraying St. Monica, St. Nicola da Tolentino, St. Simplicianus and Blessed Agostino Trionfi; in the 18th century it was enlarged by Luigi Vanvitelli and turned into a palace after 1860.

The National Archaeological Museum of the Marche Region is housed in the Palazzo Ferretti, built in the late Renaissance by Pellegrino Tibaldi; it preserves frescoes by Federico Zuccari. The Museum is divided into several sections:

- prehistoric section, with palaeolithic and neolithic artefacts, objects of the Copper Age and of the Bronze Age
- protohistoric section, with the richest existing collection of the Picenian civilization; the section includes a remarkable collection of Greek ceramics
- Greek-Hellenistic section, with coins, inscriptions, glassware and other objects from the necropolis of Ancona
- Roman section, with a statue of Augustus, Pontifex Maximus, carved sarcophagi and two Roman beds with fine decorations in ivory
- rich collection of ancient coins (not yet exposed)

The Municipal Art Gallery (Pinacoteca Civica Francesco Podesti) is housed in the Palazzo Bosdari, reconstructed between 1558 and 1561 by Pellegrino Tibaldi. Works in the gallery include:

- Circumcision, Dormitio Virginis and Crowned Virgin, by Olivuccio di Ciccarello
- Madonna with Child, panel by Carlo Crivelli
- Gozzi Altarpiece by Titian
- Sacra Conversazione by Lorenzo Lotto
- Portrait of Francesco Arsilli by Sebastiano Del Piombo
- Circumcision by Orazio Gentileschi
- Immaculate Conception and St. Palazia by Guercino
- Four Saints in Ecstasis, Panorama of Ancona in the sixteenth century and Musician Angels by Andrea Lillio

Other artists present include Francesco Podesti, Ciro Ferri and Arcangelo di Cola. Modern artists featured are Anselmo Bucci, Massimo Campigli, Bruno Cassinari, Enzo Cucchi, Carlo Levi, Aligi Sassu, Orfeo Tamburi and others.

== Transport ==
=== Shipping ===
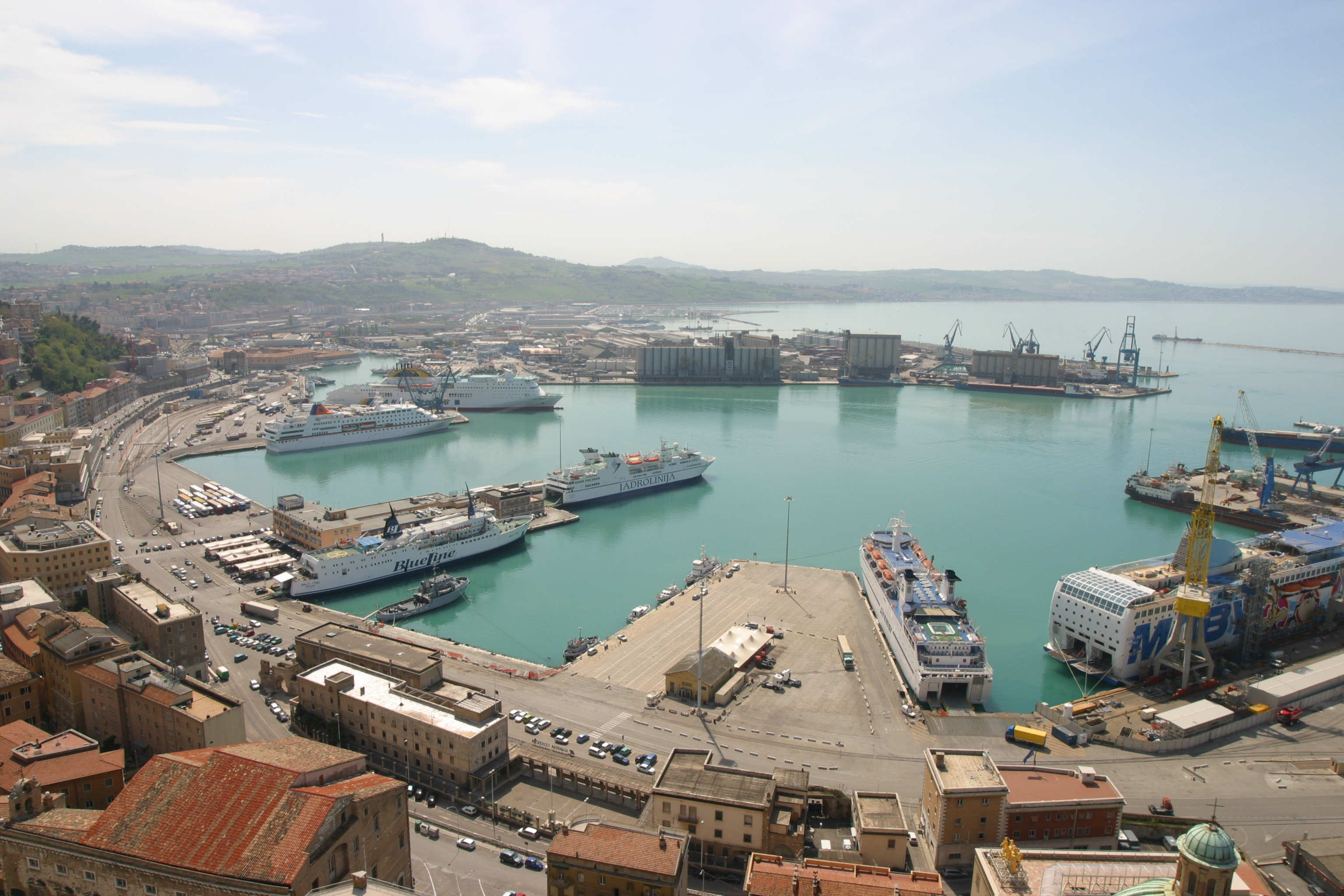
The port of Ancona

The Port has regular ferry links to the following cities with the following operators:

- Adria Ferries (Durrës)
- Jadrolinija (Split, Zadar)
- SNAV (Split) (seasonal)
- Superfast Ferries (Igoumenitsa, Patras)
- ANEK Lines (Igoumenitsa, Patras)
- Minoan Lines (Igoumenitsa, Patras)
- Marmara Lines (Çeşme)

=== Airport ===
Ancona is served by Ancona Airport (IATA: AOI, ICAO: LIPY), in Falconara Marittima and named after Raffaello Sanzio.

European Coastal Airlines, a former seaplane operator from Croatia, established trans-Adriatic flights between Croatia and Italy in November 2015, and offered four weekly flights from Ancona Falconara Airport to Split (59 minutes) and Rijeka (49 minutes).

=== Railways ===
The Ancona railway station is the main railway station of the city and is served by regional and long-distance trains. The other stations are Ancona Marittima, Ancona Torrette, Ancona Stadio, Palombina and Varano.

=== Roads ===
The A14 motorway serves the city with the exits "Ancona Nord" (An. North) and "Ancona Sud" (An. South).

=== Urban public transportation ===
The Ancona trolleybus system has been in operation since 1949. Ancona is also served by an urban and suburban bus network operated by Conerobus.

== Notable people ==
- Andrea Agostinelli (born 1957), football coach and former player
- Luigi Albertini (1871–1941), newspaper editor and politician
- Niccolò Alemanni (1583–1626), Roman antiquarian of Greek origin
- Antonio Amurri (1925–1992), author, radio and television writer
- Ivan Ančić (1624–1685), Croatian and Bosnian-Herzegovinian Franciscan and religious writer
- Francesco Appiani (1704–1792), painter
- Raphael Isaiah Azulai (c.1743–1826 or 1830), rabbi
- Baltimora (born 2001), singer
- Simone Barontini (born 1999), middle-distance runner
- Guglielmo Barnabò (1888–1954), actor
- Vincenzo Barone (born 1952), chemist
- Alberto Leoncini Bartoli (born 1932), diplomat
- Moses ben Mordecai Bassola (1480–1560), rabbi
- Guido Bedarida (1900–1962), Jewish writer
- Cleto Bellucci (1921–2013), Prelate of Roman Catholic Church
- Pietro Belluschi (1899–1994), Italian-American architect
- Loredana Bertè (born 1950), singer, songwriter and actress
- Nicola Bertucci (c.1710–1777), painter
- Leo Bianchi (born 1974), Bulgarian singer-songwriter
- Federico Bonaventura (1555–1602), nobleman
- Piergiorgio Bontempi (born 1968), motorcycle racer
- Mattia Bortolussi (born 1996), footballer
- Bruno Brivonesi (1886–1970), admiral
- Bruto Brivonesi (1888–1979), admiral during World War II
- Jean Guillaume Bruguière (1749–1798), physician, zoologist and diplomat.
- Marcello Brunelli (1939–2020), neurophysiologist
- Corrado Cagli (1910–1976), painter
- Anastasia Carbonari (born 2003), Latvian cyclist
- Pietro Casaretto (1810–1878), Benedictine monk
- Abraham Isaac Castello (1726–1789), rabbi, preacher, and poet
- Christian Catalini, economist
- Michela Catena (born 1999), footballer
- Paolo Bartolommeo Clarici (1673–1721), painter
- Elisabetta Cocciaretto (born 2001), tennis player
- Luca Cognigni (born 1991), footballer
- Benjamin Consolo (1806–1887), Hebrew writer and translator
- Federico Consolo (1841–1906), violinist and composer
- Cesare and Vincenzo Conti, painters
- Alessandro Contini-Bonacossi (1878–1955), politician
- Franco Corelli (1921–2003), opera singer
- Cyriac of Ancona (1391–1453/55), navigator and archeologist
- Giorgio da Sebenico (c.1410–1473), Venetian sculptor and architect
- Enrico David (born 1966), artist
- Gino De Dominicis (1947–1998), artist
- Andrea De Falco (born 1986), footballer
- Lodovico De Filippis (born 1915), footballer
- Antonio De Gaetano (1934–2007), racewalker
- Gianni Del Buono (born 1943), middle-distance runner
- Charles Félix Jean-Baptiste Camerata-Passionei di Mazzoleni (1826–1853), French-Italian aristocrat
- Bartolomeo di Tommaso (c.1400–1453/54), painter
- Giulia Domenichetti (born 1984), football and futsal player
- Francesca Donato (born 1969), politician
- Eugenio Duca (1950–2021), politician
- Giovanna d'Aragona, Duchess of Amalfi (1478–1510), aristocrat
- Roberta Faccani (born 1968), singer and actress
- Pier Simone Fanelli (1641–1703), painter
- Jacob Fano, rabbi and Hebrew poet
- Antonio Fatati (c.1410–1484), Catholic bishop
- Gabriel Ferretti (c.1385–1456), priest
- Gabriele Ferretti (1795–1860), Catholic cardinal
- Giuseppe Milesi Pironi Ferretti (1817–1873), Catholic cardinal
- Raimondo Ferretti (1650–1719), Roman Catholic prelate
- Joseph Fiametta (died 1721), rabbi
- Stefania Follini (born 1961), interior designer
- Francesco Foschi (1747–1819), painter
- Daniele Gaglianone (born 1966), film director
- Renato Galeazzi (born 1945), politician who served as Mayor of Ancona
- Gianmarco Garofoli (born 2002), cyclist
- Giuseppe Gatta (born 1967), football player
- Gaudentius of Ossero, bishop of Ossero
- Roberto Giolito (born 1962), automobile designer
- Leondino Giombini (born 1975), volleyballer
- Stefano Maria Benvenuti Gostoli (born 1976), politician
- Pope Gregory XII (1327–1417)
- Carlo Ilari (born 1991), footballer
- Patrick Kalambay (born 1984), footballer
- Pietro Lanfranconi (1596–1674), Bishop of Terni
- Riccardo Lattanzi (1934–1991), football referee
- Judah Messer Leon (c.1420 to 1425–c.1498), rabbi
- Bruno Leoni (1913–1967), classical-liberal political philosopher and lawyer
- Leone Levi (1821–1888), English jurist and statistician
- Andrea Lilio (1555–1642), painter
- Virna Lisi (1936–2014), actress
- Filippo Lombardi (born 1990), footballer
- Luca Lombardi (born 2002), footballer
- Edmondo Lorenzini (1937–2020), footballer
- Lorenzo Lotto (c.1480–1556/57), Renaissance painter, draughtsman, and illustrator
- Elena Luzzatto (1900–1983), architect
- Carlo Macchini (born 1996), gymnast
- Valeria Mancinelli (born 1955), politician and mayor of Ancona
- Luca Marchegiani (born 1966), footballer
- Tommaso Marini (born 2000), fencer
- Raffaele Martelli (1811–1880), Italian-Australian priest
- Roberto Masciarelli (born 1963), volleyballer
- Lucia Mascino (born 1977), actress
- Niccolò Matas (1798–1872), architect
- Enzo Matteucci (1933–1992), football coach and player
- Giovanni Mingazzini (1859–1929), neurologist
- Angelo Minghetti (1822–1885), ceramist
- Roberto Molinelli (born 1963), musician
- Emanuele Naspetti (born 1968), racing driver
- Carlo Nembrini (1611–1677), Bishop of Parma
- Vittoria Nenni (1915–1943), anti-fascist activist
- Alessio Nepi (born 2000), footballer
- Ave Ninchi (1914–1997), actress
- Francesco Maria Nocchieri, sculptor
- Gastone Novelli (1895–1919), World War I flying ace
- Luigi Olivi (1894–1917), World War I flying ace
- Marco Osio (born 1966), football manager and former player
- Alessandro Pajola (born 1999), basketballer
- Samuele Papi (born 1973), volleyballer
- Daniele Paponi (born 1988), footballer
- Antonio Francesco Peruzzini (1643 or 1646–1724), painter
- Giovanni Peruzzini (1629–1694), painter
- Emanuele Pesaresi (born 1976), footballer
- Maria Petraccini (1759–1791), anatomist, physician
- Matteo Piccione (1615 – 1671), painter
- Gastone Pierini (1899–1967), weightlifter
- Massimo Piloni (born 1948), football coach and former player
- Laura Pisati (1869/1870–1908), mathematician
- Francesco Podesti (1800–1895), painter
- Achille Polonara (born 1991), basketballer
- Antonio Ricci (c.1565–c.1635), Spanish Baroque painter
- Emma Gaggiotti Richards (1825 – 1912), painter
- Lorenzo Salvi (1810–1879), operatic tenor
- Emilio Savonanzi (1580 – 1666), painter
- Benvenutus Scotivoli (died 1282), Bishop of Osimo
- Agostina Segatori (1841–1910), model
- Rossella Franchini Sherifis (born 1953), diplomat
- Cristian Shpendi (born 2003), Albanian footballer
- Stiven Shpendi (born 2003), Albanian footballer
- Daniele Silvetti (born 1973), politician and current mayor of Ancona
- Prince Annibale Simonetti, Roman nobleman
- Carlo Smuraglia (1923–2022), politician
- Annamaria Solazzi (born 1965), beach volleyballer
- Umberto Spadaro (1904–1981), actor
- Anna Rita Sparaciari (born 1959), fencer
- Stamira (died 1173), heroic self-sacrificing woman who saved the city of Ancona during the 1173 siege
- Giuseppe Sturani (1855–1940), conductor
- Marco Tamberi (born 1958), high jumper
- Paul Tana (born 1947), Italian-Canadian film director and screenwriter
- Tommaso Tentoni (born 1997), footballer
- Daniel Terni (1760s–1814), rabbi
- Pellegrino Tibaldi (1527–1596), mannerist architect, sculptor, and mural painter
- Ariel Toaff (born 1942), historian
- Giove Toppi (1888–1942), cartoonist
- Rosanna Vaudetti (born 1937), television host
- Vito Volterra (1860–1940), mathematician
- Eduard von Böhm-Ermolli (1856–1941), Austrian general during World War I
- Renato Zaccarelli (born 1951), football manager and former player
- Filippo Zappata (1894–1994), engineer
- Bruno Zauli (1902–1963), president of the Italian Athletics Federation
- Luigi Zenobi (1547/48–after 1602), virtuoso cornett player
- Cvijeta Zuzorić (1552–1648), lyric poet from the Republic of Ragusa

== International relations ==
=== Twin towns – sister cities ===
Ancona is twinned with:

- Çeşme, Turkey
- Galați, Romania
- Split, Croatia
- Zadar, Croatia
- Granby, Canada
- Svolvær, Norway

== See also ==
- Maritime republics
- Naval operations of the First Italian War of Independence
- Siege of Ancona (1860)
- Roman Catholic Archdiocese of Ancona-Osimo
- University of Ancona
- Biblioteca comunale Luciano Benincasa
- History of AC Ancona
- US Ancona 1905
- Stadio del Conero
- Ancona Courthouse

== Sources ==
- "Ancona", Italy (2nd ed.), Coblenz: Karl Baedeker, 1870, OL 24140254M
