= Luigi Zenobi =

Luigi Zenobi (also Zanobi; 1547 or 1548 – after 1602), also known as Luigi del Cornetto, was a virtuoso cornett player. Born in Ancona, Italy, Zenobi moved to Vienna, where he was employed by Maximilian II as the court cornett player. In 1583, he relocated to Ferrara and became the most highly paid musician in the Este court at the time. By 1587, he had become music director of the Oratory of Filippo Neri. Zenobi returned to Vienna sometime before Alfonso II d'Este's death in 1597. His letters indicate that he spent his remaining years in Naples under the employment of Viceroy Fernando Ruiz de Castro Andrade y Portugal.

Zenobi wrote numerous letters, of which 18 survive; his writings indicate that he was a painter, miniaturist, poet, and amateur musicologist. He wrote madrigal verse and a cycle of one hundred sonnets on the death of Maximilian II. His most famous writing is his long letter to an unnamed prince, which he probably wrote around 1600. In it, Zenobi describes the qualities of a perfect musician, and discusses the characteristics of good singers, music directors, composers, string and wind players, and accompanists.
