= Abraham Portaleone =

Italian-Jewish physician

Abraham Portaleone (died July 29, 1612) was an Italian-Jewish physician in Mantua. He was a pupil of Jacob Fano.

== Life ==
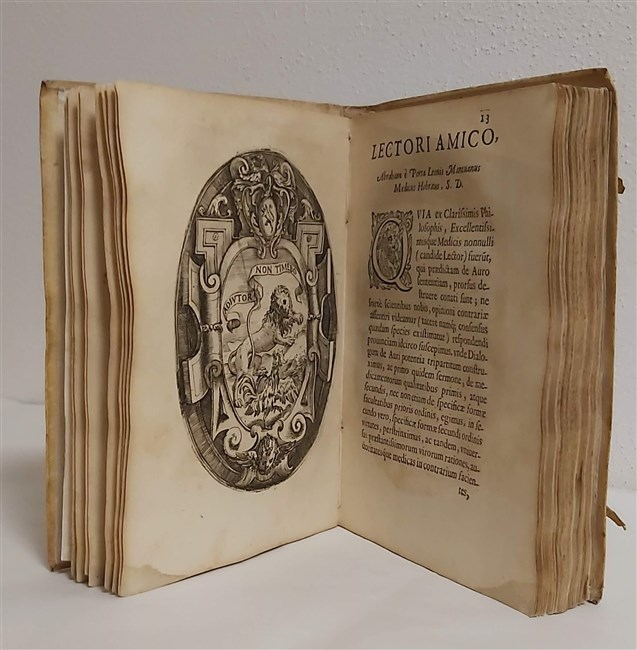
Dialogi Tres de Auro by Portaleone, published in Venice, 1584

The Dukes Guglielmo and Vincenzo of Mantua, in whose service he was, granted him privileges in 1577 and 1587 respectively; and Pope Gregory XIV. gave him a dispensation which enabled him to attend Christians.

== Works ==
At the request of Duke Guglielmo he wrote two medical treatises in Latin, which he dedicated to his patron, under the titles Consilia Medica and Dialogi Tres de Auro respectively; the latter treatise was published in 1584.

His Shilte ha-Gibborim (or Shiltei, meaning shields of the heroes – other works share this title) was an encyclopedic work that related arts and sciences to the Temple; it included techniques of warfare. It was printed in 1612. Abraham Melamed considers he was clearly influenced by Machiavelli. B. Barry Levy notes it as the first Hebrew book to adopt European punctuation, but also considers it typical of Renaissance thought in its integration of science and religion.

== Family ==
He was great-grandson of Guglielmo Portaleone (son of David, son of Lazzaro, son of Guglielmo).

== Bibliography ==
- Gianfranco Miletto, La Biblioteca di Avraham ben David Portaleone secondo l'inventario della sua eredità, Firenze, Olschki, 2013 ISBN 978 88 222 6273 8.
