= Republic of Ancona =

Italian maritime republic (11th century–1532)

Republic of Ancona: Respublica anconitana (Latin)
- c. 1000 (1198)–1532
- Flag (1174–1532) Coat of arms
- Motto: Ancon dorica civitas fidei (Latin) Dorian Ancona, city of faith
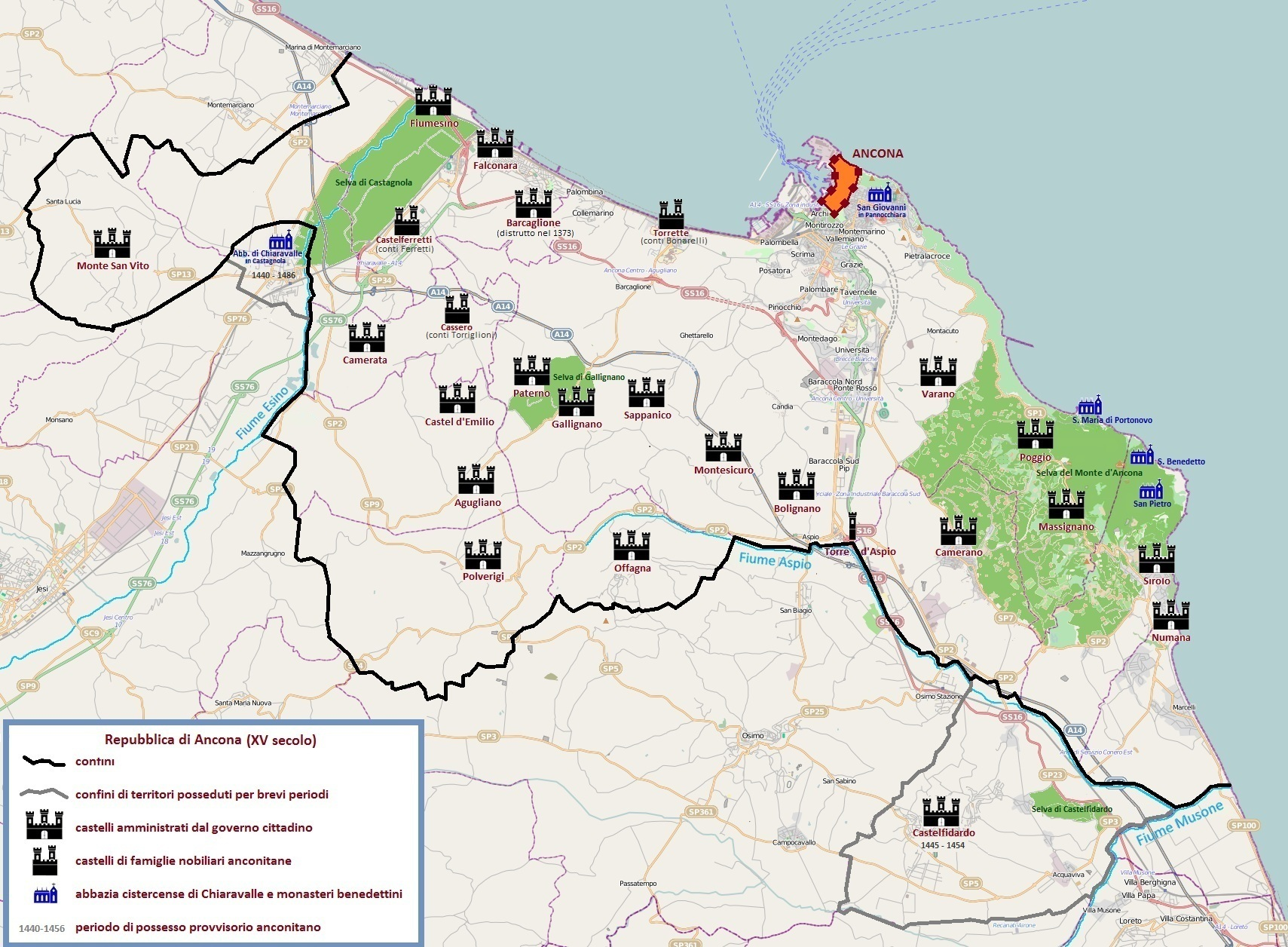
- Republic of Ancona in the 15th century – borders and castles
- Status: de facto independence, autonomous republic under high papal sovereignty
- Capital: Ancona
- Common languages: Latin, Marchigiano dialect
- Religion: Roman Catholicism, Judaism
- Government: oligarchic republic with popular representation
- Historical era: Middle Ages, Renaissance
  - gradual acquisition of autonomy: c. 1000 (1198)
  - Coup d'état by Pope Clement VII: 1532
- Currency: Agontano
Preceded by	Succeeded by
Kingdom of Italy (Holy Roman Empire)	Papal States
- Today part of: Italy

The Republic of Ancona was a medieval commune and maritime republic on the Adriatic coast of what is modern-day Italy. It was notable for its economic development and maritime trade, particularly with the Byzantine Empire and Eastern Mediterranean, although somewhat confined by Venetian supremacy on the sea. The state enjoyed excellent relations with the Kingdom of Hungary, was an ally of the Republic of Ragusa, and maintained good relations with the Ottoman Empire. All of these relationships enabled it to serve as central Italy's gateway to the Orient.

Included in the Papal States since 774, the city of Ancona came under the influence of the Holy Roman Empire around 1000, but gradually gained independence to become fully independent with the coming of the communes in the 11th century, under the high jurisdiction of the Papal States. Its motto was Ancon dorica civitas fidei ("Dorian Ancona, city of faith"), referencing the Greek foundation of the city.

Ancona was an oligarchic republic ruled by six Elders, who were elected by the three terzieri into which the city was divided: S. Pietro, Porto, and Capodimonte. It had a series of maritime laws known as Statuti del mare e del Terzenale ("Statutes of the sea and of the arsenal") and Statuti della Dogana ("Statutes of the Customs").

== Maritime relations and warehouses ==
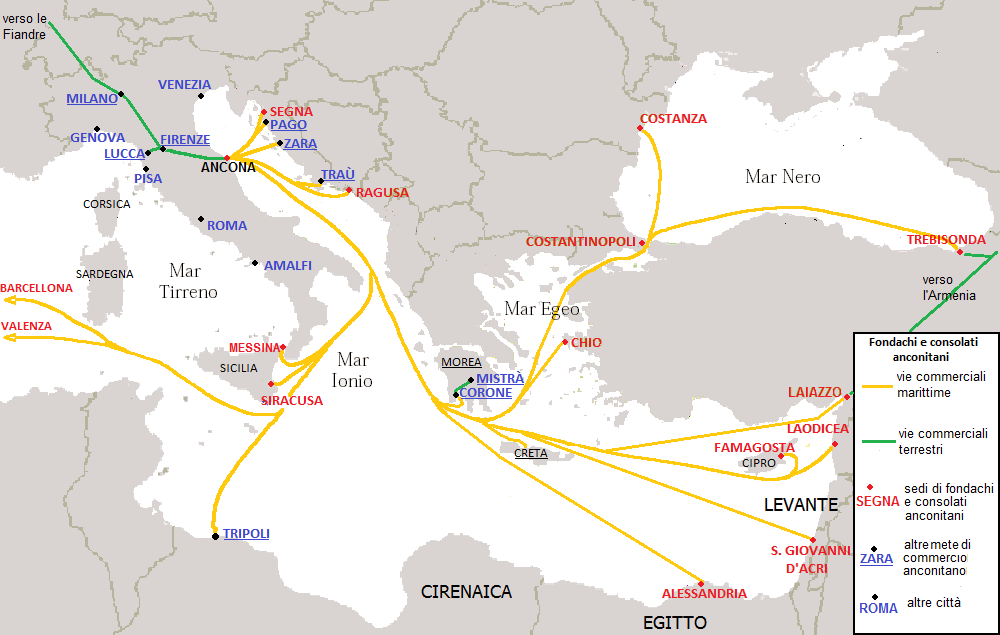
Trade routes and warehouses of the maritime Republic of Ancona

The fondachi (colonies with warehouses and accommodation buildings (Note: These were small gated enclaves within a city, often just a single street, where the laws of the city were administered by a governor appointed from home, and there would be a church under home jurisdiction and shops with Italian styles of food.)) of the Republic of Ancona were continuously active in Constantinople, Alexandria and other Eastern Mediterranean ports, while the sorting of goods imported by land (especially textiles and spices) fell to the merchants of Lucca and Florence.

In Constantinople, there was perhaps the most important fondaco, where the Anconitans had their own church, Saint Stephen; in 1261, they were granted the privilege of having a chapel in the St. Sophia. Other Anconitan fondachi were in Syria (Laiazzo and Laodicea), Romania (Constanţa), Egypt (Alexandria), Cyprus (Famagusta), Palestine (San Giovanni d'Acri), Greece (Chios), and Asia Minor (Trebizond). Moving to the west, Anconitan warehouses were present in the Adriatic in Ragusa and Segna, in Sicily (Syracuse and Messina), Spain (Barcelona and Valencia), and Africa (Tripoli).

== Coins ==
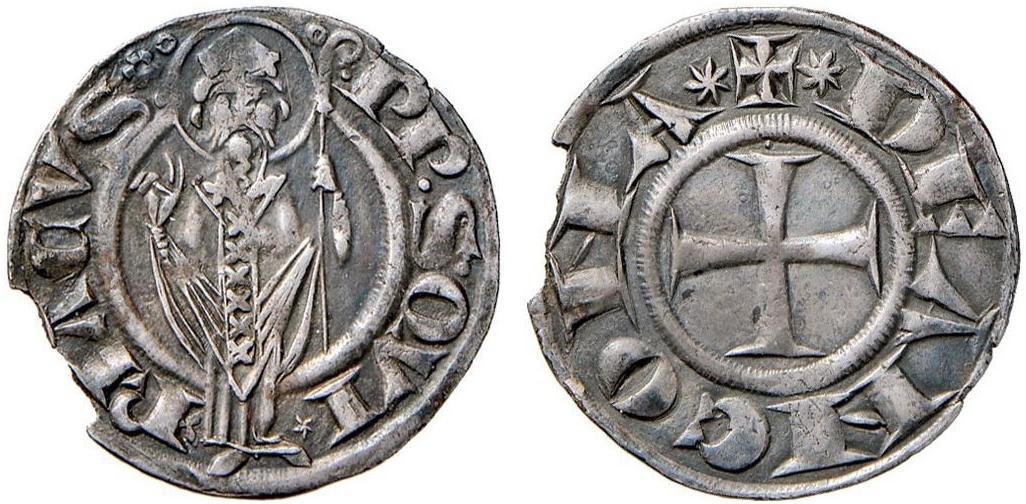
Agontano

The first reports of Ancona's medieval coinage begin in the 12th century when the independence of the city grew and it began to mint coinage without Imperial or papal oversight. The agontano was the currency used by the Republic of Ancona in its heyday; it was a large silver coin of 18–22 mm in diameter and weighing 2.04–2.42 grams.

Later and less famously, Ancona began minting a gold Agnoto coin, also known as the Ancona Ducat. Specimens of this coin have survived from the 15th and 16th centuries, until the city's loss of independence in 1532.

== Art ==
Anconitan art had long been influenced by maritime relations with Dalmatia and the Levant.

Its major medieval monuments show a union between Romanesque and Byzantine art. Among the most notable are the Duomo, with a Greek cross and Byzantine sculptures, and the church of Santa Maria di Portonovo.

In the 14th century, Ancona was a centre of what some historians term the "Adriatic Renaissance", a movement in Dalmatia, Venice and the Marches characterised by a rediscovery of classical art and a continuity with Gothic art. A notable architect and sculptor of this movement was Giorgio da Sebenico; his counterpart Carlo Crivelli was a renowned painter.

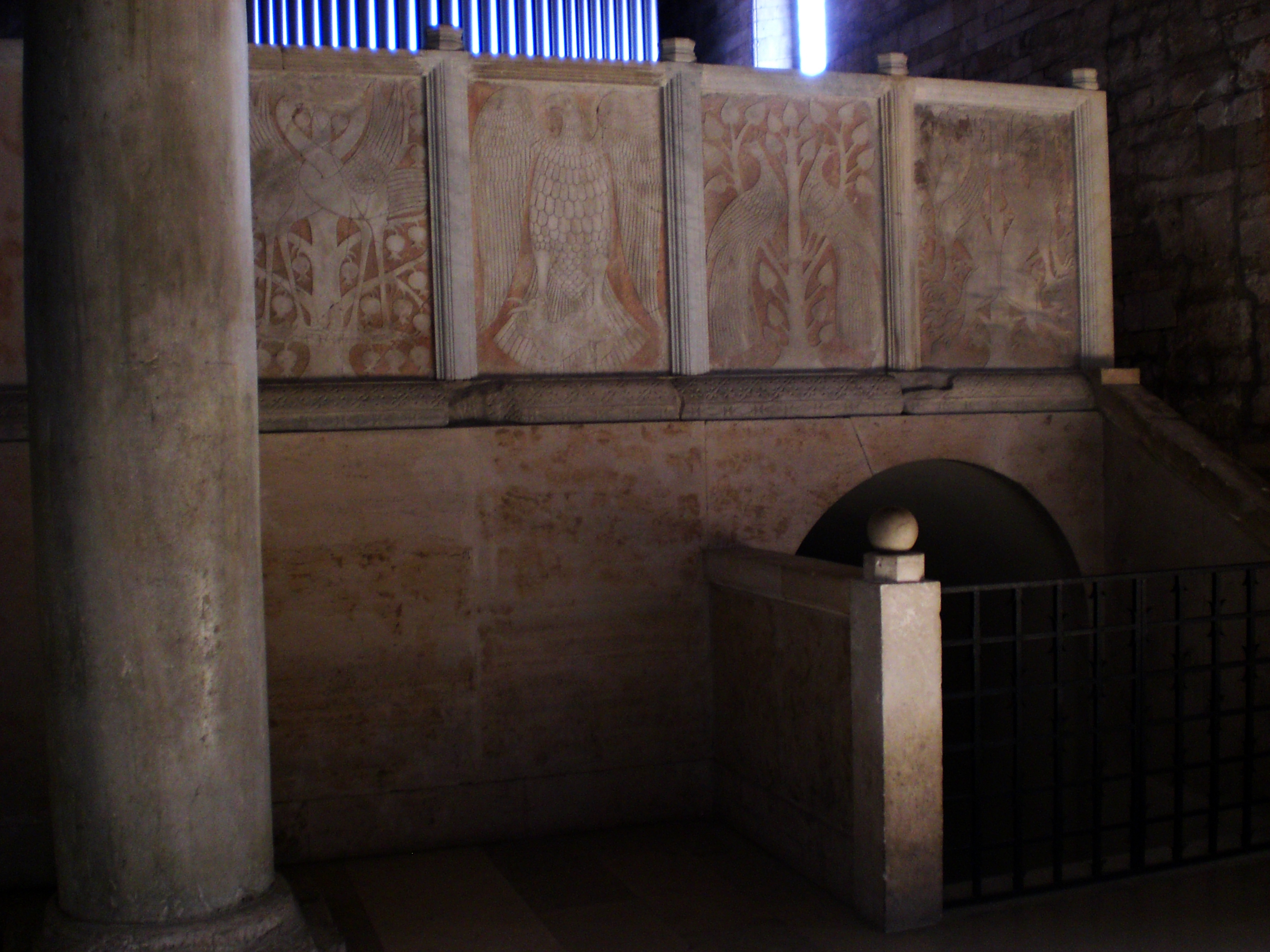
Byzantine sculptures inside the cathedral

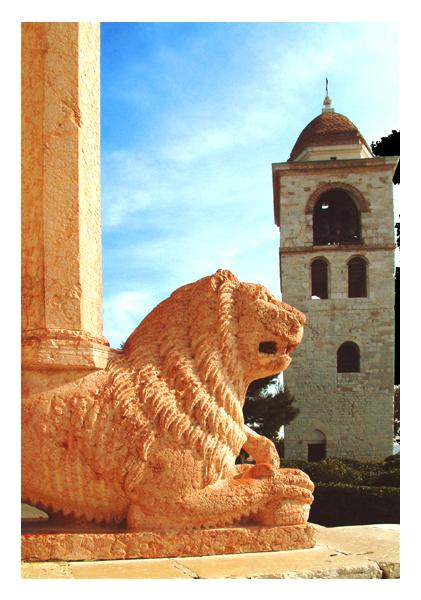
Prothyrum and bell tower of the cathedral

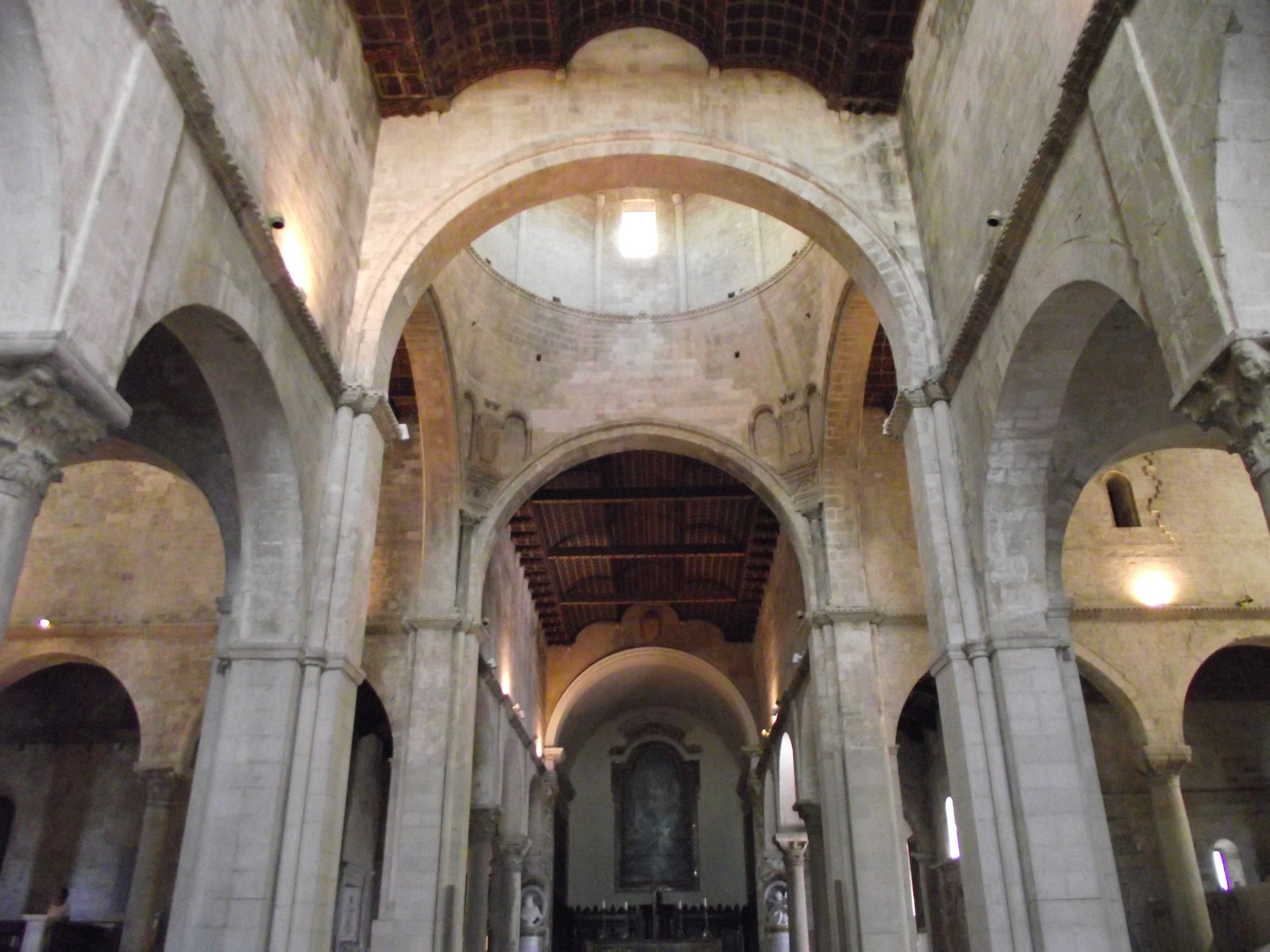
Interior of the cathedral, with Byzantine plan (Greek cross)

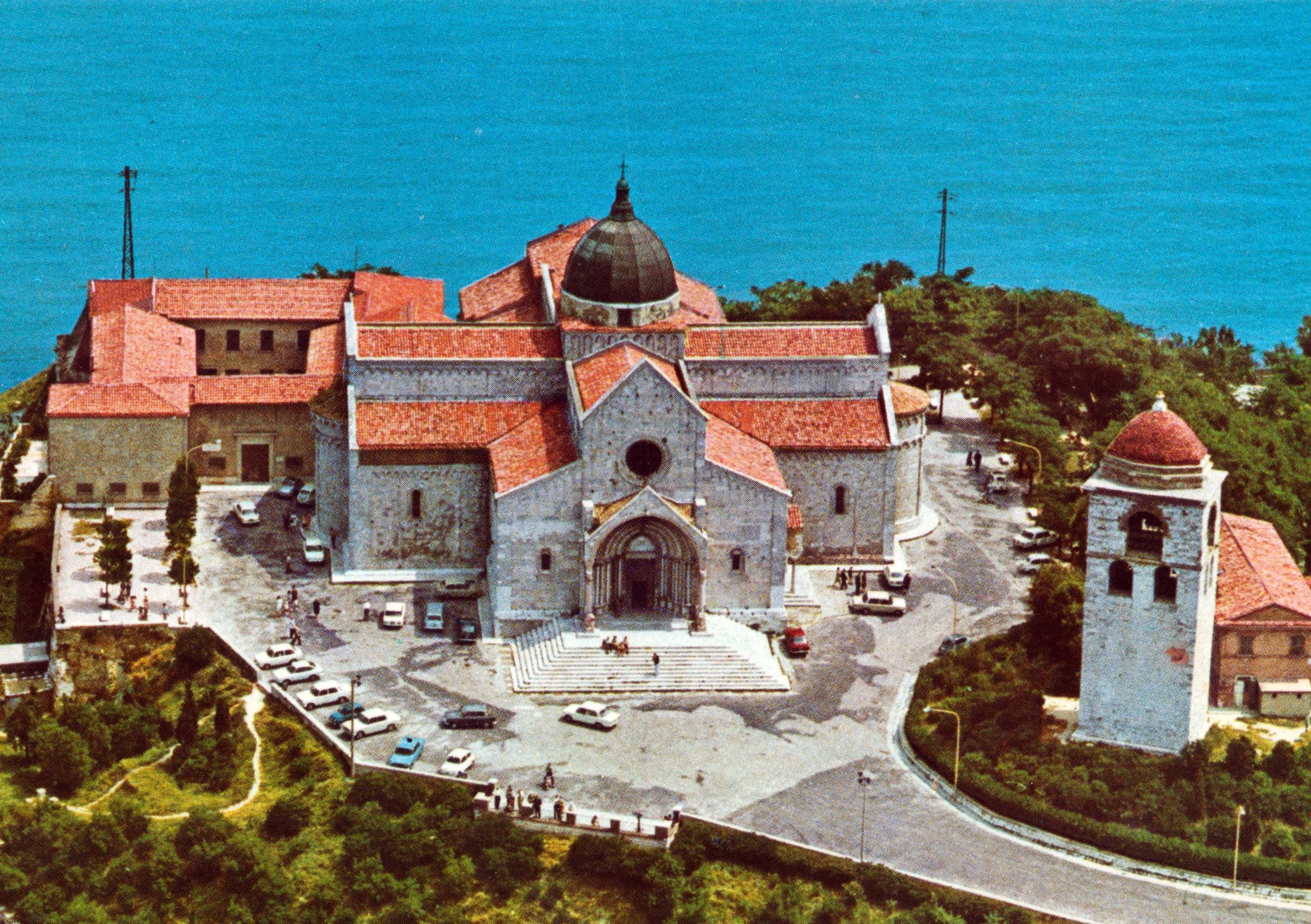
Cathedral, aerial view

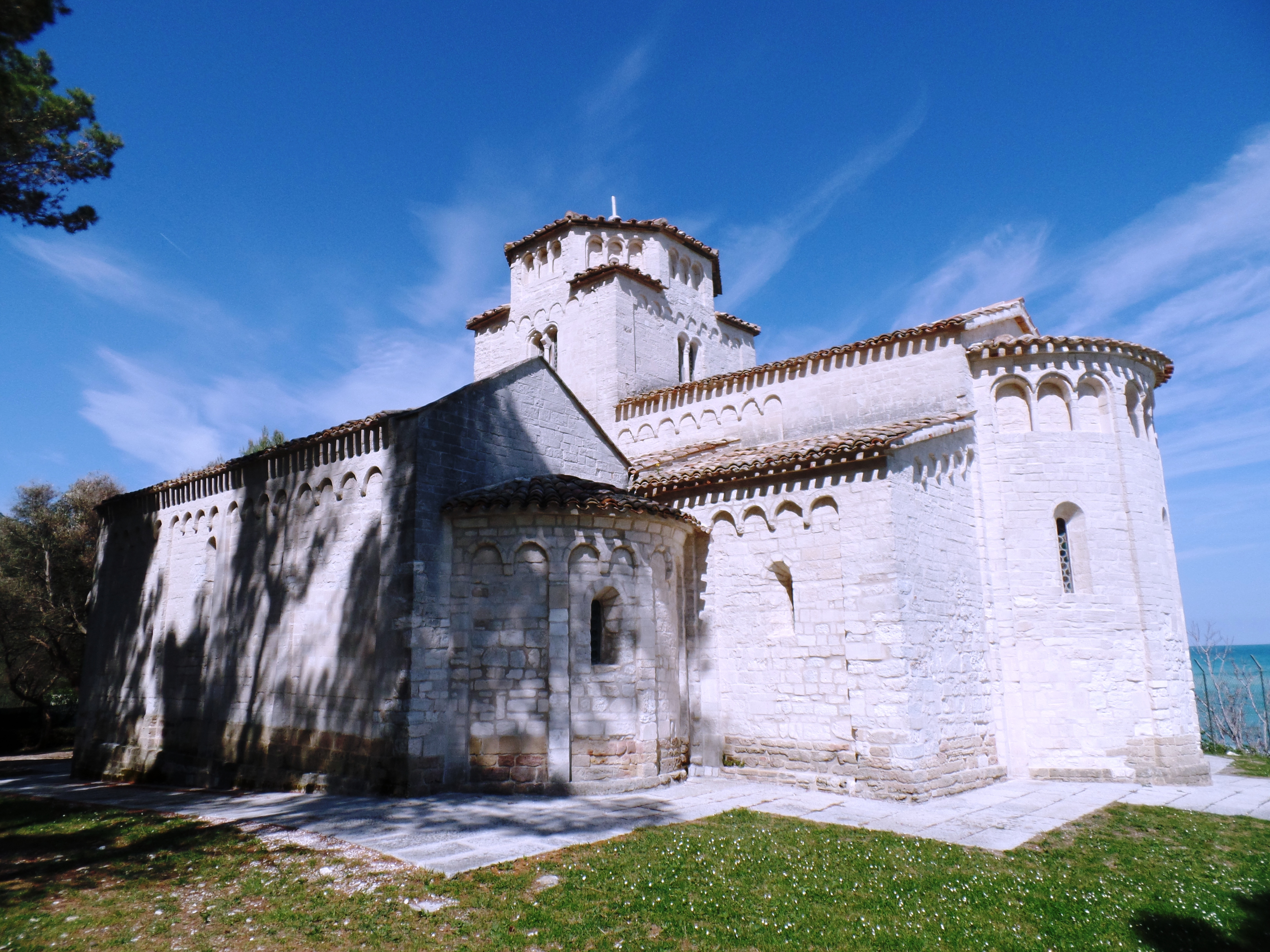
Church of Santa Maria di Portonovo, whose plan is a fusion of a Byzantine Greek cross and a Romanesque basilica

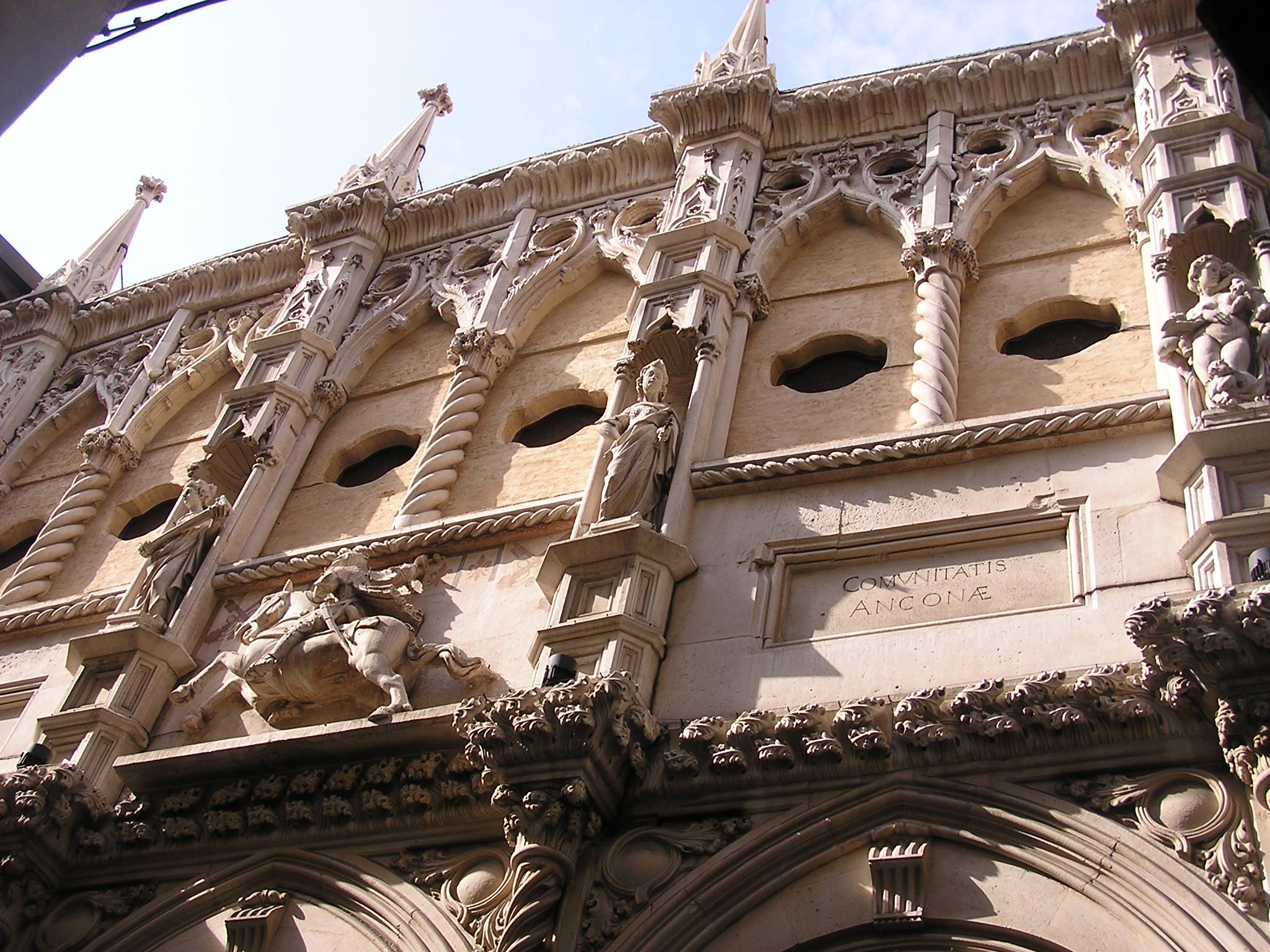
Loggia dei Mercanti, Giorgio da Sebenico (Adriatic Renaissance)

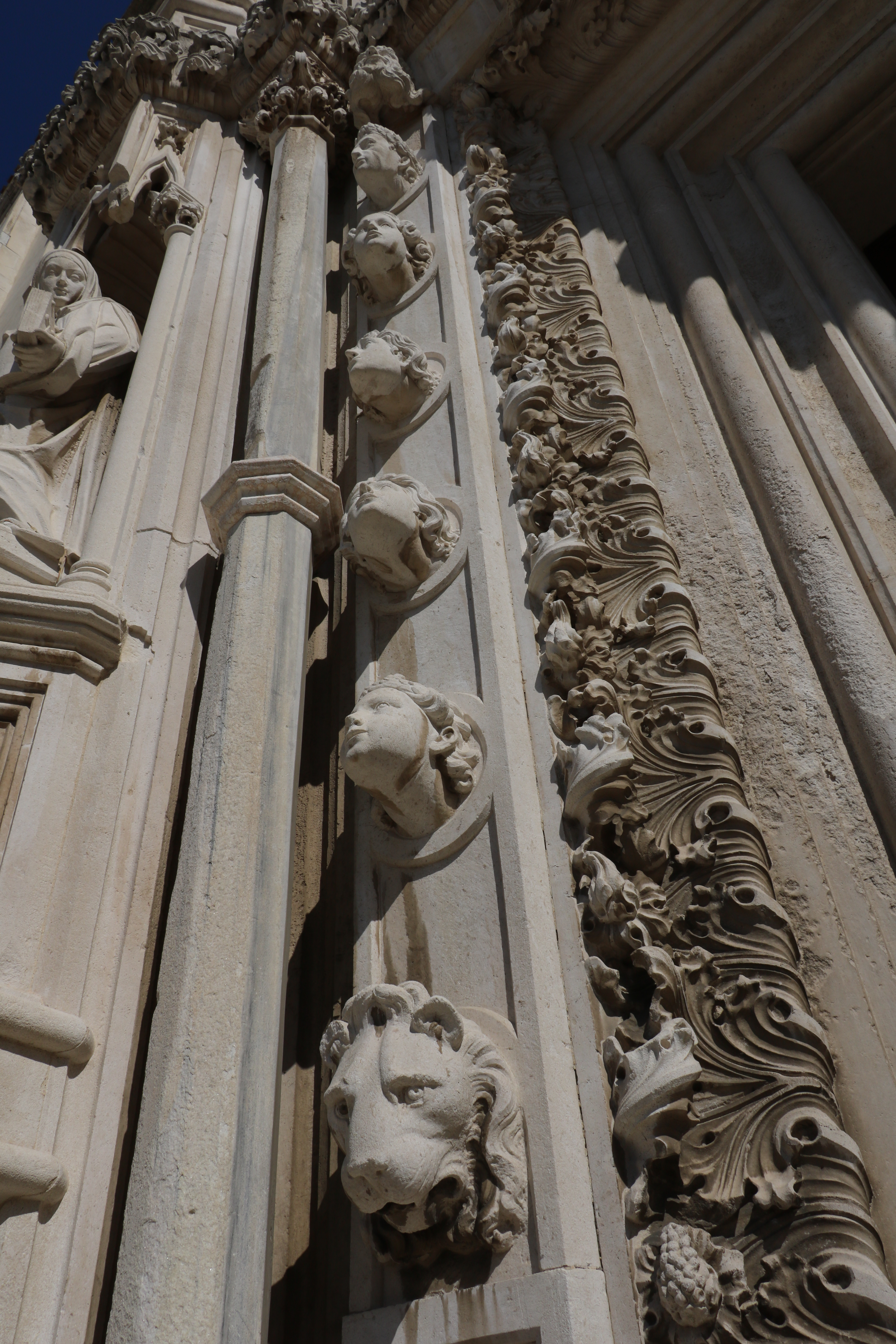
Church of San Francesco alle Scale, Giorgio da Sebenico (Adriatic Renaissance)

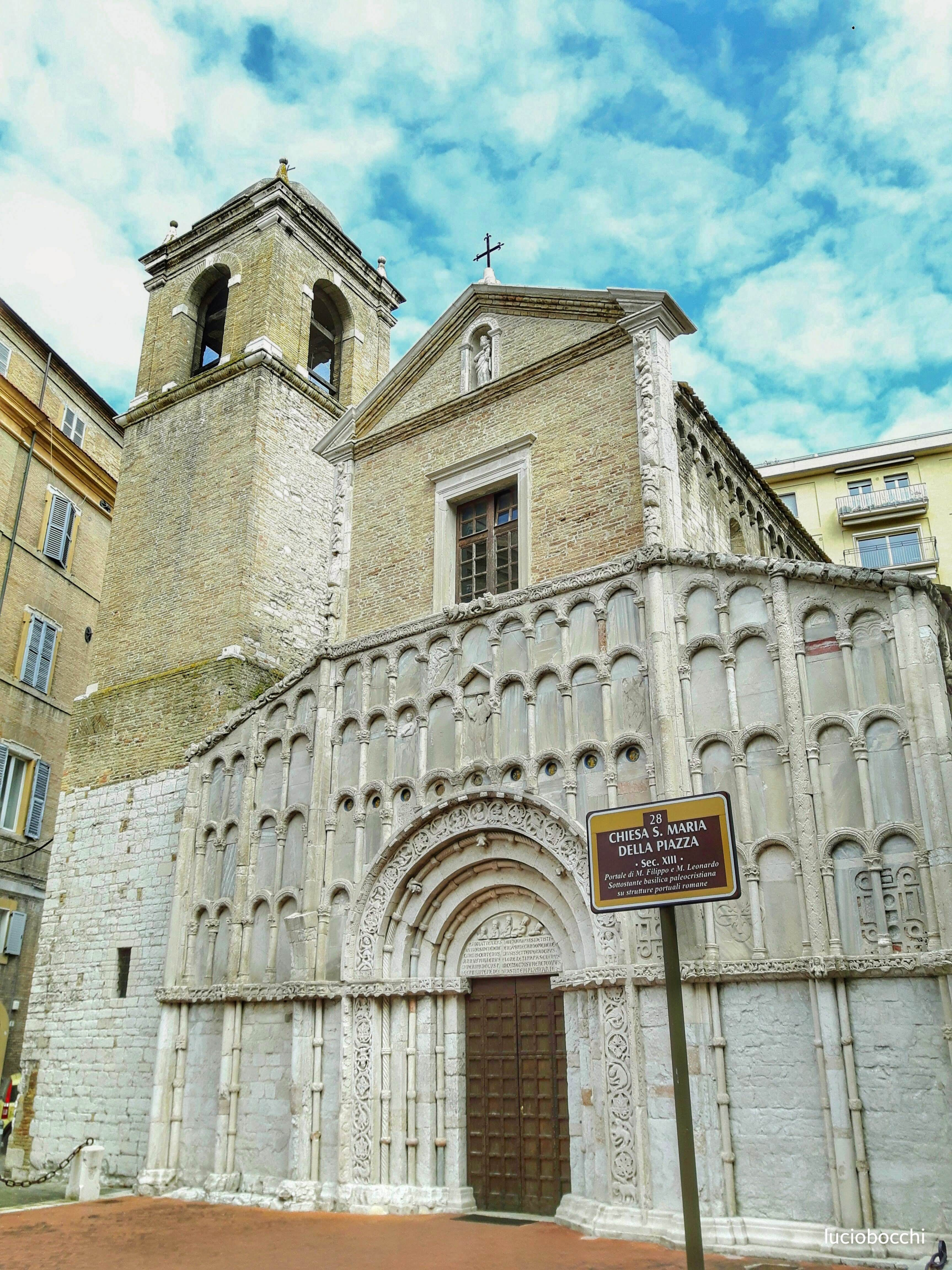
Romanesque church of Santa Maria della Piazza

== Navigators ==
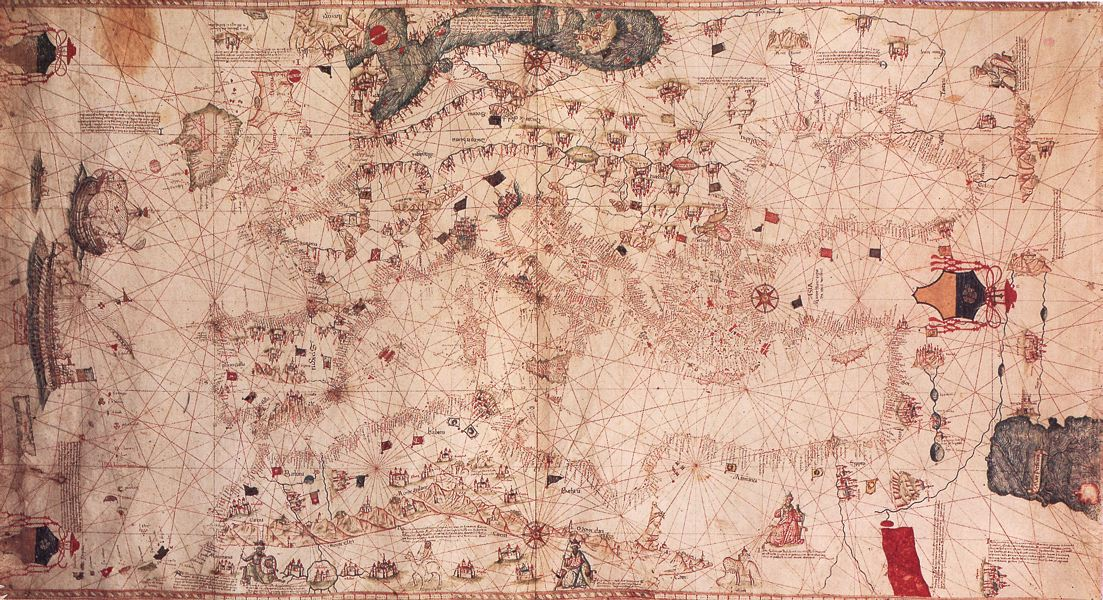
Grazioso Benincasa, Portolan chart of Mediterranean sea

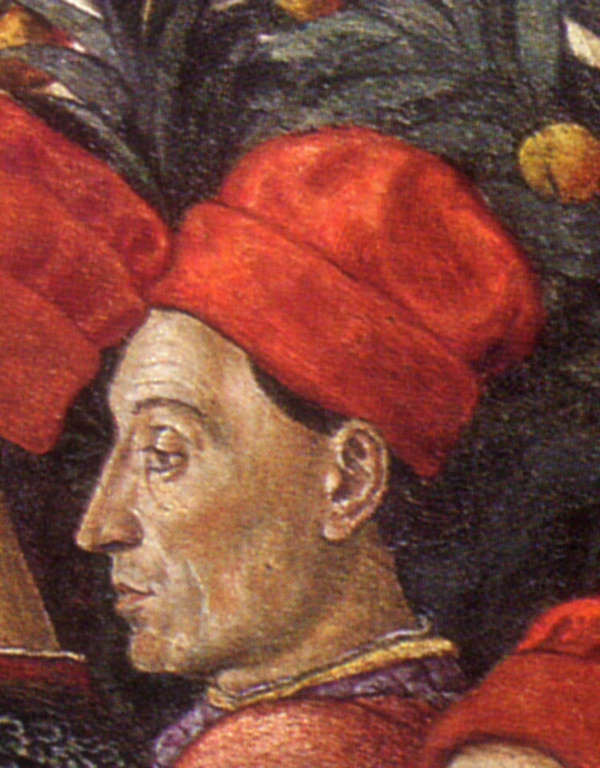
Portrait of Ciriacus of Ancona, the navigator-archaeologist (1459)

The navigator and archaeologist Cyriacus of Ancona was a restlessly itinerant Italian navigator and humanist who came from a prominent family of merchants. He has been called the Father of Archaeology: "Cyriac of Ancona was the most enterprising and prolific recorder of Greek and Roman antiquities, particularly inscriptions, in the fifteenth century, and the general accuracy of his records entitles him to be called the founding father of modern classical archaeology." He was named by his fellow humanists "father of the antiquities", who made his contemporaries aware of the existence of the Parthenon, Delphi, the Pyramids, the Sphinx and other famous ancient monuments believed destroyed.

The navigator Grazioso Benincasa was born in Ancona; he was the best-known Italian maritime cartographer of the 15th century and the author of several portolan charts of the Mediterranean:

== History ==
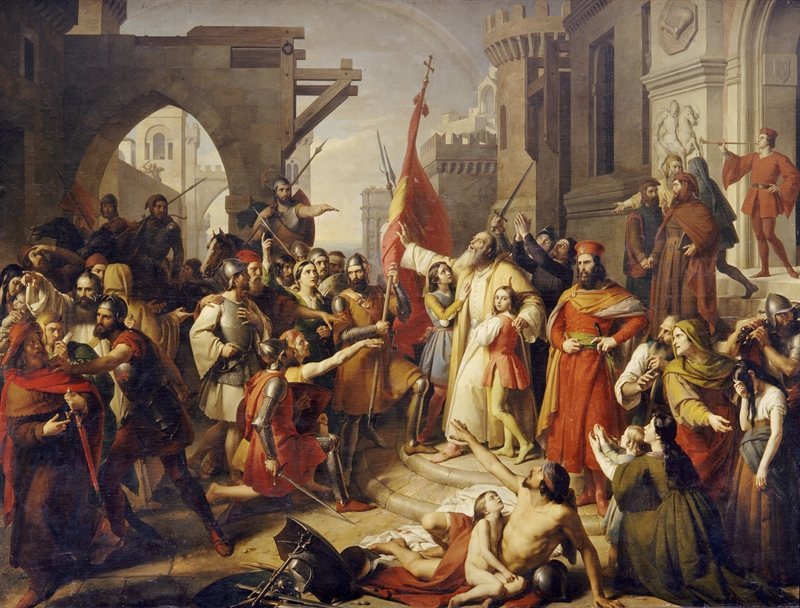
The Oath of the Anconetani by Francesco Podesti, 1844. It depicts the Siege of Ancona of 1174.

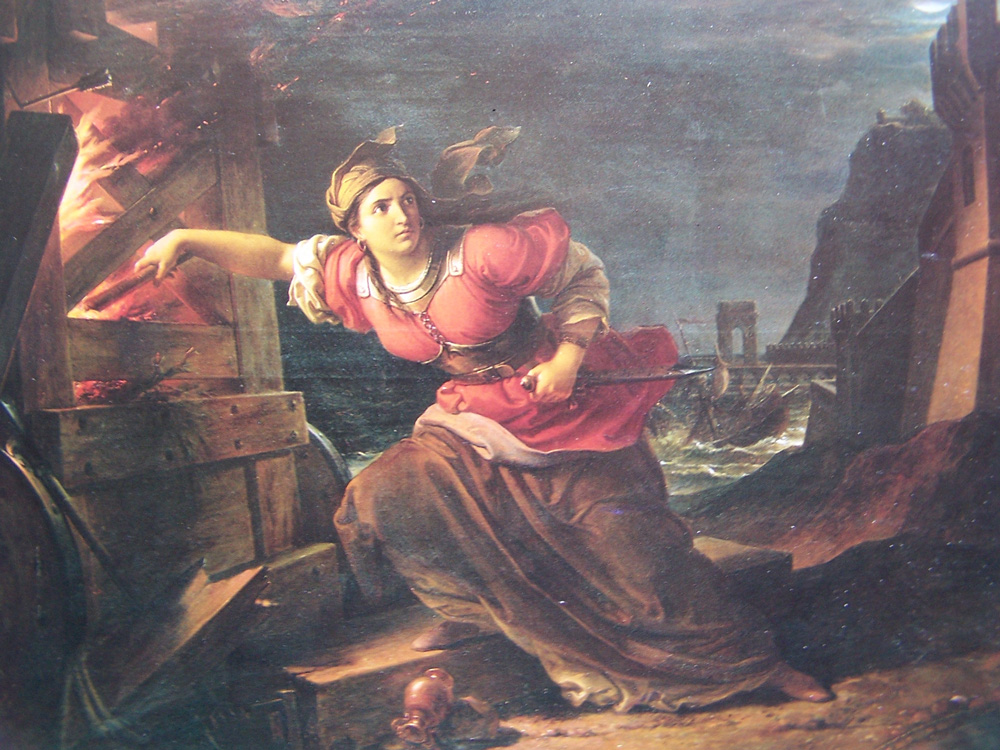
Francesco Podesti, Stamira

After 1000, Ancona became increasingly independent, eventually turning into an important maritime republic, often clashing against the nearby power of the Republic of Venice. Ancona had to guard against the designs of both the Holy Roman Empire and the papacy. It did not as a rule engage in offensive warfare against rival republics, but was frequently forced to defend itself. Venice never succeeded in subduing Ancona, despite a series of military expeditions, trade wars, and naval blockades.

Ancona was strong enough to resist attack by the Holy Roman Empire on three occasions, as the Empire sought to reassert its authority over Ancona and all Italian communes. In 1137 Ancona was besieged by Emperor Lothair II, in 1167 by Emperor Frederick Barbarossa, and once more in 1174. In that year, Christian I, archbishop of Mainz and the Emperor's archchancellor, joined with Venice to besiege Ancona but were forced to retreat. The Venetians deployed numerous galleys and the galleon Totus Mundus in the port of Ancona, while imperial troops laid siege from the land. After some months of dramatic resistance, the Anconitans were able to send a small contingent to Emilia-Romagna to ask for help. Troops from Ferrara and Bertinoro arrived to save the city and repelled the imperial troops and the Venetians in battle. (Note: One of the protagonists of the siege of 1174 was the widow Stamira, who showed great courage by setting fire to the war machines of the besieger with an axe and a torch.)

In the struggle between the popes and the Holy Roman Emperors that troubled the Italian Peninsula from the 12th century onwards, Ancona sided with the Guelphs.

Originally named Communitas Anconitana (Latin for "Anconitan community"), Ancona had an independence de facto: Pope Alexander III (around 1100–1181) declared it a free city within the Papal States; Pope Eugene IV confirmed the legal position defined by his predecessor and on 2 September 1443 officially declared it a republic, with the name Respublica Anconitana; almost simultaneously Ragusa was officially called "republic", confirming the fraternal bond that united the two Adriatic ports.

Unlike other cities of central and northern Italy, Ancona never became a seignory. The Malatesta took the city in 1348, taking advantage of the Black Death and a fire that had destroyed many of its important buildings. The Malatesta were ousted in 1383.

Pope Clement VII, under the false pretext of an imminent attack on the city by the Ottoman Turks, offered to add new fortifications to the Citadel on Colle Astagno at the papacy's expense and sent the architect Antonio da Sangallo the Younger. This was in fact a pretext for papal troops to occupy Ancona, as Clement was anxious to replenish the empty coffers of the papacy after the Sack of Rome in 1527. On 19 September 1532, Ancona was occupied and, as papal troops in the Citadel aimed their cannons at the city and its main access roads, was forced to unconditionally surrender its independence; with an ante litteram coup d'état, Pope Clement VII put an end to de facto freedom, thus placing the city under the direct dominion of the Papal States.

== Communities in the Republic ==
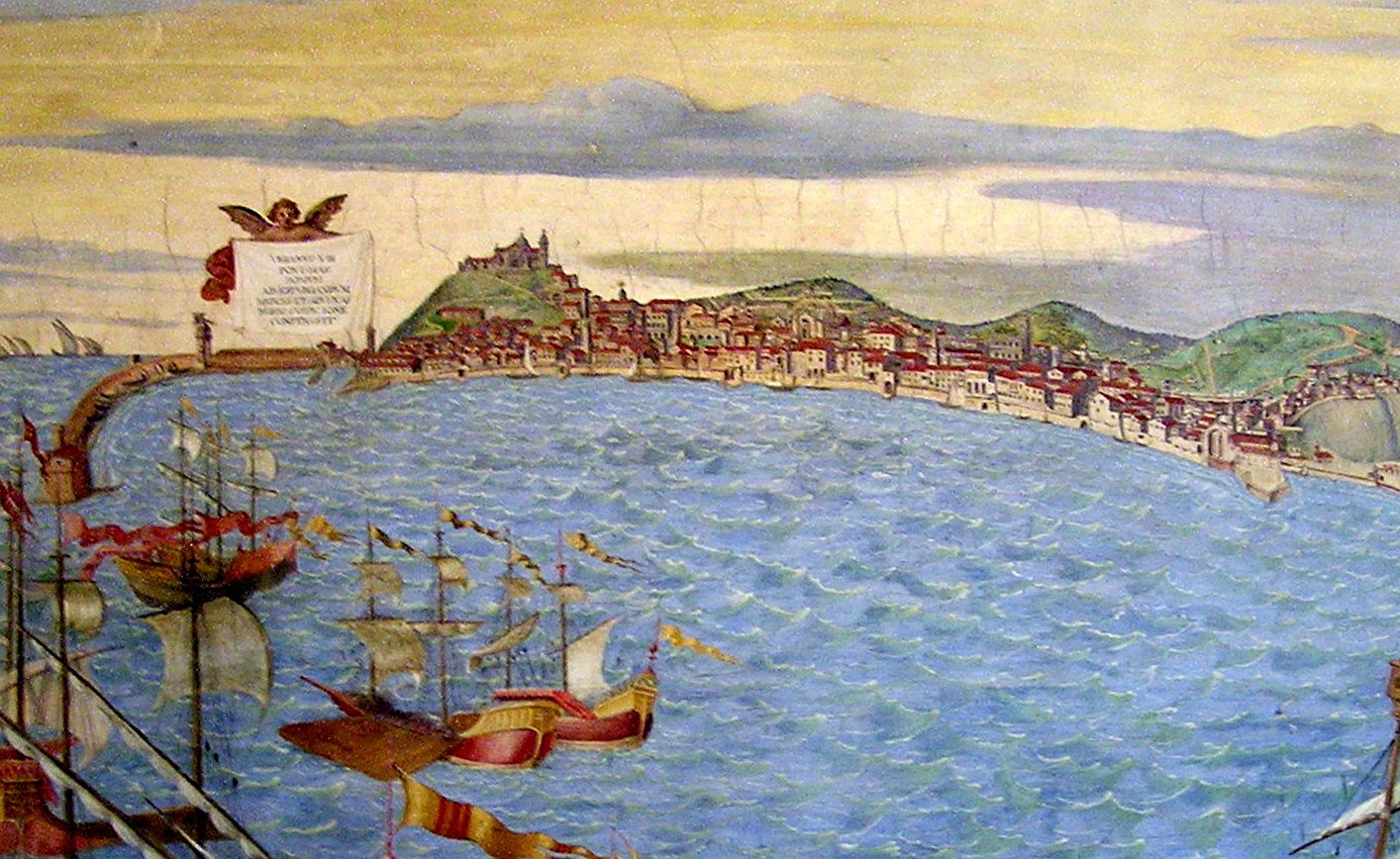
Port of Ancona (16th century)

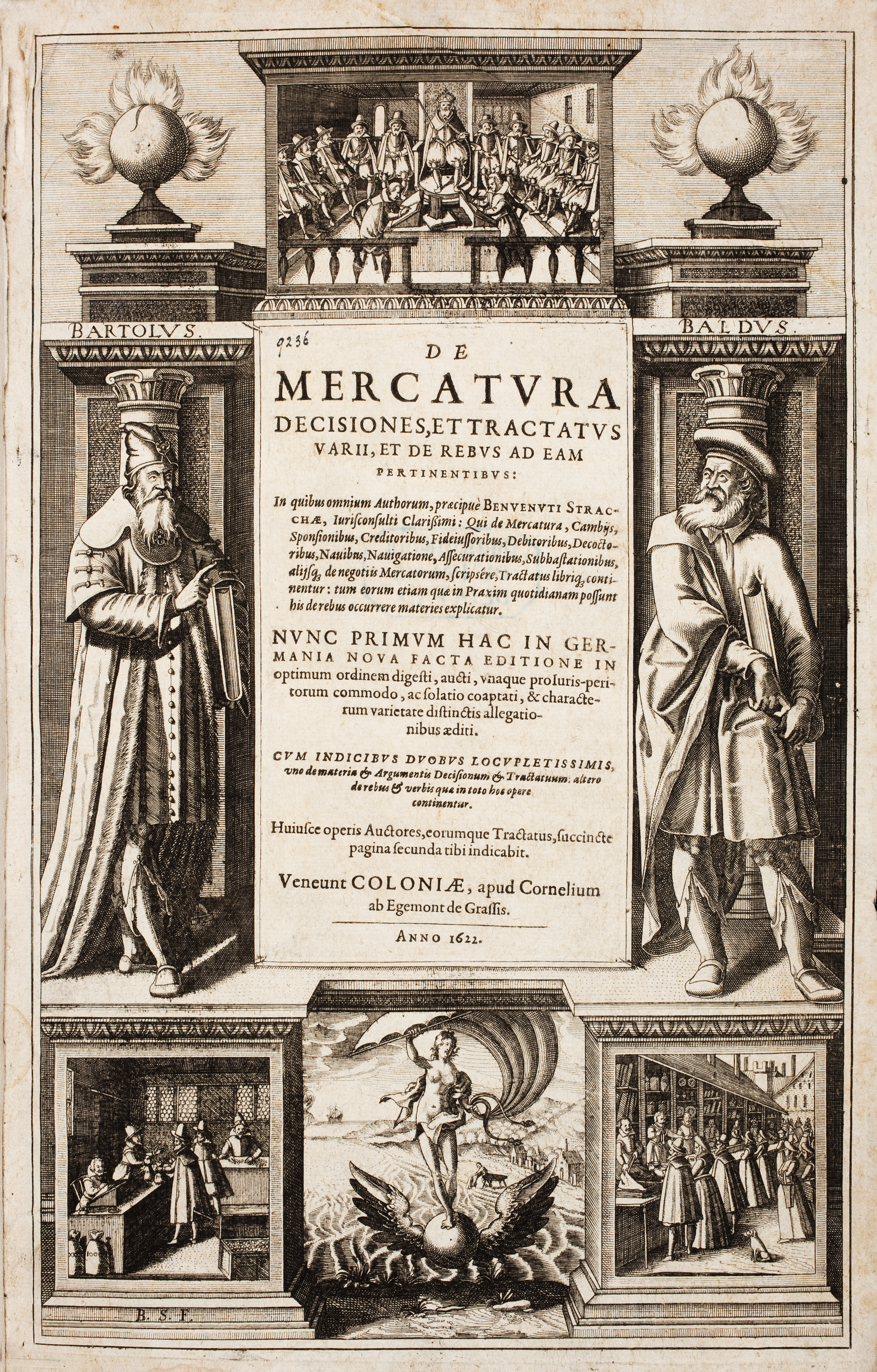
Benvenuto Stracca, De mercatura

Ancona had Greek, Albanian, Dalmatian, Armenian, Turkish and Jewish communities.

Ancona, as well as Venice, became a very important destination for merchants from the Ottoman Empire during the 16th century. The Greeks formed the largest of the communities of foreign merchants. They were refugees from former Byzantine or Venetian territories that were occupied by the Ottomans in the late 15th and 16th centuries. The first Greek community was established in Ancona early in the 16th century. At the opening of the 16th century there were 200 Greek families in Ancona. Most of them came from northwestern Greece, i.e. the Ionian Islands and Epirus. In 1514, Dimitri Caloiri of Ioannina obtained reduced customs duties for Greek merchants coming from the towns of Ioannina, Arta and Avlona in Epirus. In 1518 a Jewish merchant of Avlona succeeded in lowering the duties paid in Ancona for all "the Levantine merchants, subjects to the Turk".

In 1531 the Confraternity of the Greeks (Confraternita dei Greci) was established, which included Eastern Orthodox and Catholic Greeks. They secured the use of the Church of St. Anna dei Greci and were granted permission to hold services according to the Greek and the Latin rite. The church of St. Anna had existed since the 13th century, initially as "Santa Maria in Porta Cipriana," on the ruins of the ancient Greek walls of Ancona.

In 1534 a decision by Pope Paul III favoured the activity of merchants of all nationalities and religions from the Levant and allowed them to settle in Ancona with their families. A Venetian travelling through Ancona in 1535 recorded that the city was "full of merchants from every nation and mostly Greeks and Turks." In the second half of the 16th century, the presence of Greek and other merchants from the Ottoman Empire declined after a series of restrictive measures taken by the Italian authorities and the pope.

Disputes between the Eastern Orthodox and Catholic Greeks of the community were frequent and persisted until 1797 when the city was occupied by the French, who closed all the religious confraternities and confiscated the archive of the Greek community. The French would return to the area to reoccupy it in 1805–1806. The church of St. Anna dei Greci was re-opened to services in 1822. In 1835, in the absence of a Greek community in Ancona, it passed to the Latin Church.

== Commercial law ==
During the time of the Republic of Ancona (11th to 16th century), Commercial law evolved to support its maritime trade, which was central to its economy and independence. Ancona’s legal framework was particularly influenced by its status as a maritime republic and its competitive but cooperative relationship with other Adriatic trading powers like Venice and Ragusa. This period saw Ancona prioritising merchant rights and contract standardisation, essential for facilitating commerce with the Byzantine Empire and the Levant.

Key documents from the period highlight the use of notary records to validate trade agreements and safeguard merchants' investments. Benvenuto Stracca, a notable 16th-century jurist from Ancona, was an important reference in formalising commercial legal principles. His work, De Mercatura (1553), is regarded as one of the earliest comprehensive treatises on Commercial law, particularly relevant for guiding the conduct of merchants and the framework for contracts within and beyond Ancona's borders.

These practices, and the legal protections afforded to trade, enabled Ancona to sustain a significant degree of autonomy and economic success until it was ultimately absorbed by the Papal States in 1532, marking the end of its independent commercial legal system.

== Alliance with Ragusa ==
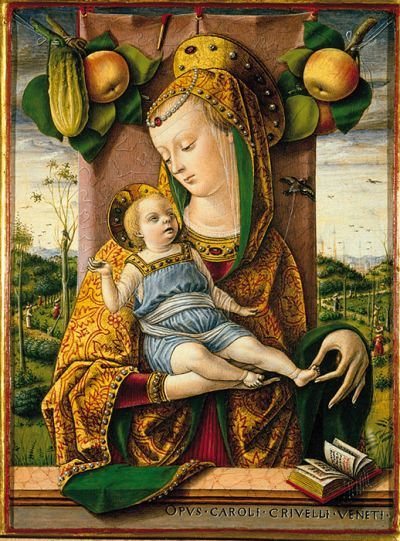
Carlo Crivelli, Madonna con Bambino, Civic Art Gallery of Ancona

Commercial competition among the Venice, Ancona and the Ragusa was very strong because all of them bordered the Adriatic Sea. They fought open battles on more than one occasion. Venice, aware of its major economic and military power, disliked competition from other maritime cities in the Adriatic. Several Adriatic ports were under Venetian rule, but Ancona and Ragusa retained their independence. To avoid succumbing to Venetian rule, these two republics made multiple lasting alliances.

Venice conquered Ragusa in 1205 and held it until 1382 when Ragusa regained de facto freedom, paying tributes first to the Hungarians, and after the Battle of Mohács, to the Ottoman Empire. During this period Ragusa reconfirmed its old alliance with Ancona.

== Bibliography ==
- John Phillip Lomax (2004). "Ancona". In Christopher Kleinhenz (ed.). Medieval Italy: an Encyclopedia. Routledge. pp. 30–31. ISBN 0415939291.
- Peter Earle (1969), "The commercial development of Ancona, 1479–1551", Economic History Review, 2nd ser., vol. 22, p. 28–44.
- Joachim-Felix Leonhard, Ancona nel Basso Medioevo. La politica estera e commerciale dalla prima crociata al secolo XV. Il lavoro editoriale, Ancona 1992 (original edition: Die Seestadt Ancona im Spätmittelalter, Niemeyer Max Verlag GmbH, 1983).
- William Smith, ed. (1872) [1854]. "Ancona". Dictionary of Greek and Roman Geography. London: John Murray.
- "Ancona". Chambers's Encyclopaedia. London. 1901.
- Victor Castiglione (1901), "Ancona", Jewish Encyclopedia, vol. 1, New York.
- "Ancona", Central Italy and Rome: Handbook for Travellers (15th ed.), Leipzig: Karl Baedeker, 1909, OCLC 423237.
- Ashby, Thomas (1911). "Ancona" . In Chisholm, Hugh (ed.). Encyclopædia Britannica. Vol. 01 (11th ed.). Cambridge University Press. pp. 951–952.
- Benjamin Vincent (1910), "Ancona", Haydn's Dictionary of Dates (25th ed.), London: Ward, Lock & Co..
- Roy Domenico (2002). "Marche: Ancona". Regions of Italy: a Reference Guide to History and Culture. Greenwood. pp. 209+. ISBN 0313307334.
