= The Oath of the Anconetani =

Painting by Francesco Podesti

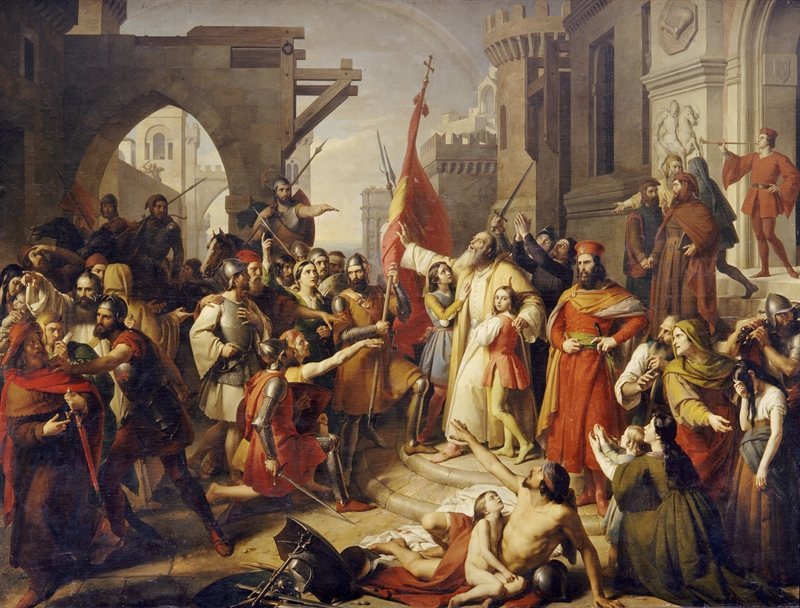
- Artist: Francesco Podesti
- Year: 1844
- Type: Oil on canvas, history painting
- Dimensions: 385 cm × 510 cm (152 in × 200 in)
- Location: Pinacoteca civica Francesco Podesti, Ancona

The Oath of the Anconetani (Italian: Giuramento degli Anconetani) is an 1844 history painting by the Italian artist Francesco Podesti. It depicts an incident from 1174 during the Siege of Ancona by the forces of the Holy Roman Empire. Amongst those shown is Stamira who became celebrated for her heroic self-sacrifice during the successful defence of the city. The siege became a popular one for Italian nationalism during the Risorgimento.

The large work was commissioned by the city council of Ancona from Podesti, one of the leading Romantic painters in Italy of the period along with Francesco Hayez. The painting was displayed at the Salon of 1855 in Paris, part of the Exposition Universelle held that year. Today it is in the collection of the city museum in Ancona.

== Bibliography ==
- Müller, Leos & Eriksonas, Linas (ed.) Statehood Before and Beyond Ethnicity: Minor States in Northern and Eastern Europe, 1600-2000. Peter Lang, 2005
- Olson, Roberta. Ottocento: Romanticism and Revolution in 19th-century Italian Painting American Federation of Arts, 1992.
