= Aurelio Tiratelli =

Italian painter (1842–1900)

- Born: 1842; Rome
- Died: 1900 (aged 57–58); Rome, Kingdom of Italy
- Education: Accademia di San Luca
- Known for: Painting
- Notable work: A Cattle Herd at Ostia; A railroad Disaster; A Cart pulled by Buffalo in the Pontine Marshes
- Awards: Order of the Crown of Italy
- Patrons: King Vittorio Emanuele; Khedive of Egypt

Aurelio Tiratelli (1842 – 1900) was an Italian painter, mainly of country scenes with animals.

He was born in Rome, and studied there at the Accademia di San Luca under Minardi, Alessandro Capalti, and Francesco Podesti for design and painting, while Giulio Tadolini and Pietro Tenerani mentored him as a sculptor. He created some sculpture in his first years as an artist, but then became a painter.

Among his major works: A Cattle Herd at Ostia was acquired by King Vittorio Emanuele; A railroad Disaster; A Cart pulled by Buffalo in the Pontine Marshes, exhibited at the Museo Revoltella of Trieste; Work in oil in Ceccano; Herd of bulls in the Roman Countryside; Un carro alla Marchegiana, vulgarly known as Mambrucca, (surroundings of Rome), exhibited at the 1889 Universal Exposition of Paris. Tiratelli sold paintings to the Khedive of Egypt. However many of his masterworks, he did not apply a title, including canvases that depicted un cavadenti in mezzo and una fiera nella Valle del Sacco (1884 Exhibition). He exhibited in Chile, South America. Tiratelli was knighted and an officer of the Order of the Crown of Italy, and orphanages wished him to become inspector, and many societies made him honorary associate. His son, Cesare Tiratelli, was also a landscape painter. Among his pupils was Giuseppe Signorini.
