= Giuseppe Signorini =

Italian painter (1857–1932)

- Born: 1857; Rome
- Died: 1932 (aged 74–75)
- Education: Accademia di San Luca
- Known for: Painter
- Movement: Orientalist

Giuseppe Signorini (1857–1932) was an Italian painter, mainly of orientalist subjects.

== Biography ==
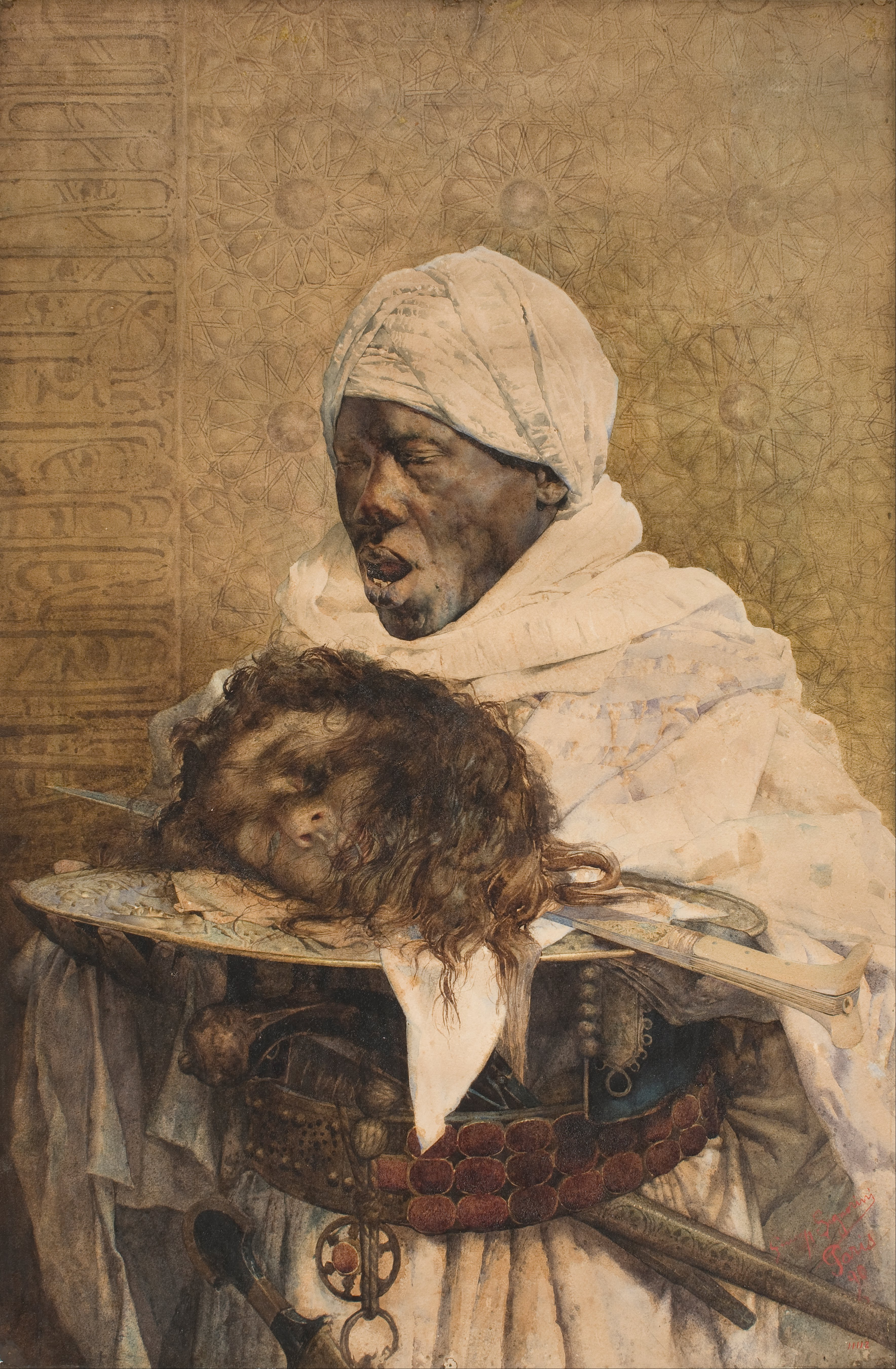
Justice in Morocco

He was born in Rome in 1857. He studied at the Accademia di San Luca, and then worked under Aurelio Tiratelli, who introduced him to the very best Italian artists of the period. He mastered the technique of watercolor very early in his career.

He often traveled to the Paris Salon exhibitions, and was influenced by the styles and orientalist themes expressed by painters like Mariano Fortuny, Ernest Meissonier, and Gérôme. He developed a substantial collection of Islamic art and textiles. He also painted portraits in costume garb. He maintained studios in both Paris and Rome.

He painted a design for an Arabic Man with Musket found at Art Museum of Princeton. He painted in watercolor a costume drama depicting a Priest and Two Men Seated at a Table found at the Metropolitan Museum of Art.

== See also ==
- List of Orientalist artists
- Orientalism
