= Agontano =

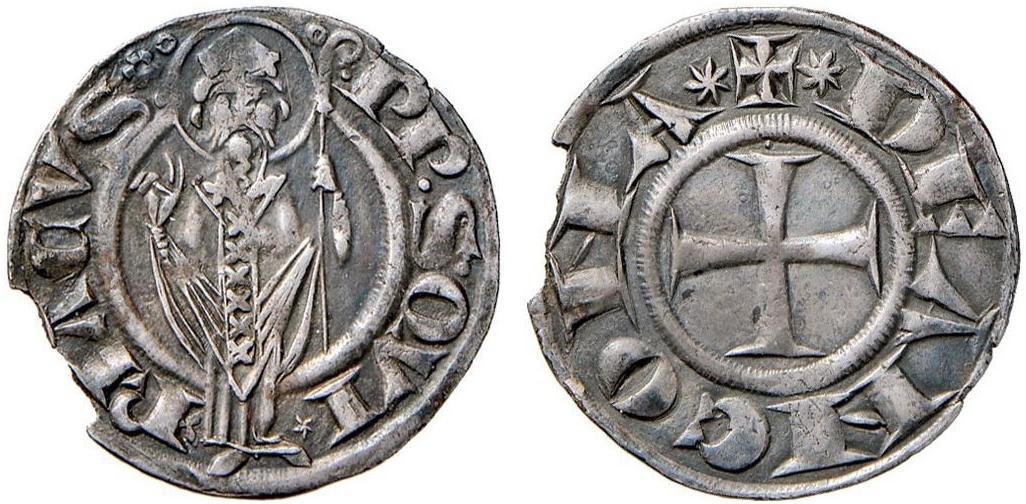

First side of the image: PP.SQVIRIACVS in circle. San Ciriaco.
Second side of the image: DE ANCONA in circle. Cross.

The Agontano was the currency used by the Italian Maritime Republic of Ancona from the 12th to the 16th centuries during its golden age. It was a large silver coin of 18-22mm in diameter and a weight of 2.04-2.42 grams, of roughly equivalent value to the Milanese Soldo.

== Origin ==
The first reports of Ancona's medieval coinage begin in the 12th century when the independence of the city grew and it began to mint coinage without Imperial or papal oversight. According to some traditions the city began minting currency by concession of the Byzantine Empire, following the fidelity demonstrated during the siege of 1173, which also led to the city's acquisition of its flag of the gold cross on a red field. This story may be doubtful as records for it are late and not supported by contemporary sources.

The coin, also called "Grosso Agontano", was a great success and its type was imitated in other cities of Marche and also in Emilia-Romagna, Tuscany, Lazio and Abruzzo. For example, coins of Massa Marittima, Ravenna, Rimini, Volterra, Pesaro and Ferrara. show a marked influence from Ancona.

== Gold Agontano ==
Later and less famously Ancona began minting a gold Agnoto coin, also known as the Ancona Ducat. Specimens of this coin have survived from the 15th and 16th centuries, until the city's loss of independence in 1532.

== Appearance ==
On the obverse the Agontano displays a cross enclosed by a circle around which is the inscription DE ANCONA. On the reverse is represented St.Cyriacus, protector of the city, dressed as a Greek bishop. Around this is the inscription P.P.S. QUIRIACUS. The saint's head, with the halo, interrupts the circle that encloses the rest of the body.

== See also ==
- History of coins in Italy

== Bibliography ==
- Marco Dubbini e Giancarlo Mancinelli: Storia delle monete di Ancona, edizioni Il lavoro editoriale, Ancona 2009, ISBN 978-88-7663-451-2
- AA. VV. (a cura di Lucia Travaini): L'agontano: una moneta d'argento per l'Italia medievale Univ. degli Studi di Perugia, Dip. di Scienze dell'antichità, 2003
