= Francesco Podesti =

Italian painter (1800–1895)

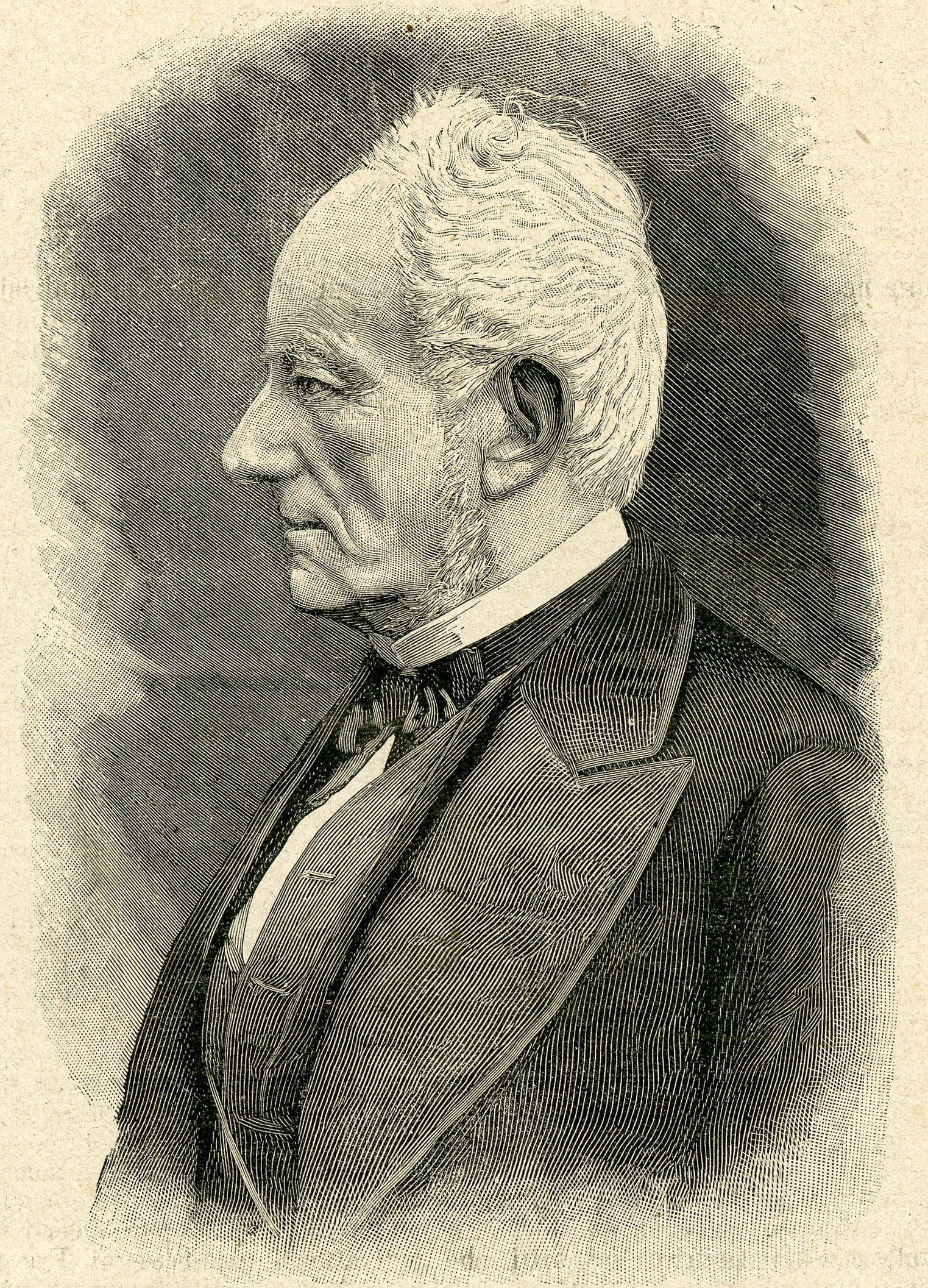
Francesco Podesti Portrait

Francesco Podesti (21 March 1800 – 10 February 1895) was an Italian painter, active in a Romantic style. Together with Francesco Hayez and Giuseppe Bezzuoli, he is considered one of the greatest Italian painters of the first half of the 19th century. He was prolific in his large canvases on historical subjects. He is best known for his fresco work, including those in the Hall of the Immacolata in the Vatican Museum.

== Early years ==
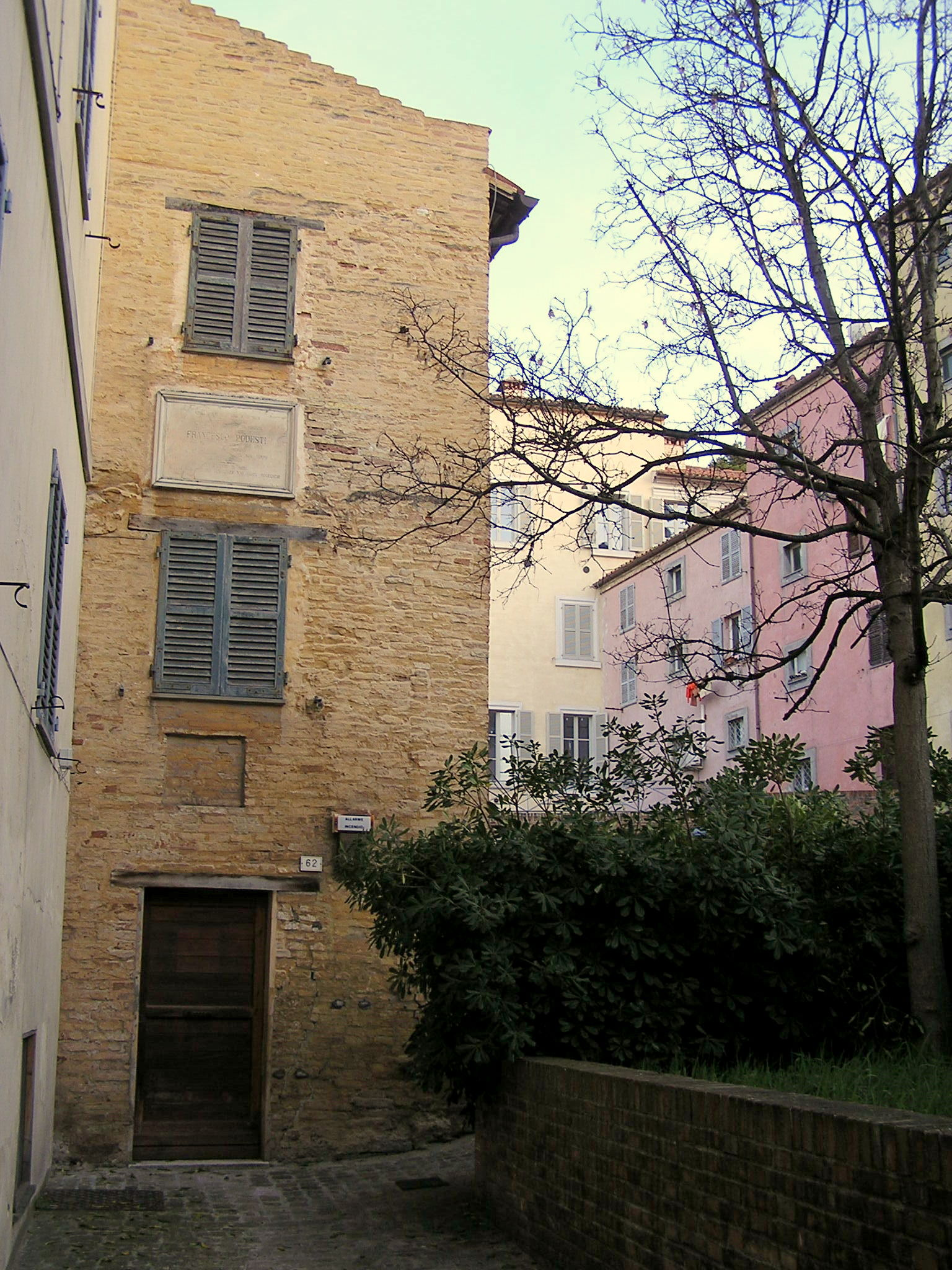
Ancona, home where Francesco Podesti was born

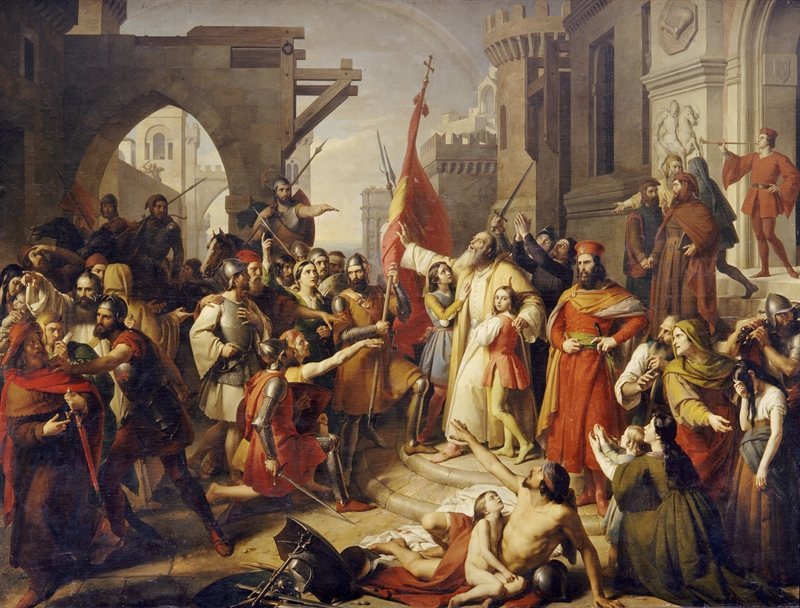
The Oath of the Anconetani, 1844

Podesti was born in Ancona to a family of modest means; His father Giuseppe was a tailor. He began studies in Pavia. At twelve, his mother, Teresa, died; his father died three years later, leaving Podesti destitute. His precocious talent gained him a stipend to study at the Accademia di San Luca in Rome; this was partly subsidized by the Marquis Bourbon of Monte Santa Maria and by the city of Ancona. In Rome, he became a pupil of Gaspare Landi and Vincenzo Camuccini. The sculptor Canova served as a mentor and also helped him financially. In Rome, he also met Jacques-Louis David.

Thankful for their stipend over the years, in 1824, he donated to the city of Ancona, two paintings of Eteocles and Polynices. It also gained him commissions for two altarpieces in town: an Annunciation for the church of the Vergine Annunziata, and a Martyrdom of St. Lawrence (1825–1827) in Ancona Cathedral (destroyed during World War II and replaced by a copy). The Prince Torlonia purchased from him a large canvas of Tasso che legge la sua Gerusalemme alla Corte di Ferrara. Podesti was to make variants of this painting also for the Prince Galitzin and count Paolo Tosi of Brescia.

In 1826, then traveled through Italy. In Milan, by commission he painted a Raphael paints the Madonna of San Luca in his studio, with la Fornarina as a model, and monsignor Bembo and Bussolante in the studio. Also for the casa Busca, he frescoed casa the Myth of Psyche.

He returned to Rome in 1835–1836 to paint frescoes for Prince Alessandro Torlonia commissioned a series of frescoes for Villa Torlonia. In the first-floor gallery, he painted I fasti denti Dei; in the second floor, The myth of Diana. Alessandro Torlonia commissioned frescoes for Palazzo Torlonia too, and when the palace was demolished during the restructuring of Piazza Venezia, some frescoes were salvaged. In 1835 he was elected to the Academy of St Luke.

He painted a series of scenes of the Decameron, both original and copies, for patrons including the King of Naples, the Marchese Ala Ponzoni, and the sig. Giacomelli of Treviso. For the same marchese Ponzoni he painted Rape of Persephone and the Rape of Europa: subjects also duplicated for marchese Antonio Busca. For a Milanese banker The Bath of Venus and The Judgement of Paris for an English patron. More copies were made by his pupils. For the Cathedral of Chiari he painted: Santi Faustino e Giovita; for the Academy of Mexico: The Angel of Justice, for King Carlo Alberto he completed the Judgement of Salomon. For this painting, he was awarded the Cross of Civil Merit of Savoy. Podesti refused the offer of a professorship at the Albertina Royal Academy at Turin.

== Mature career ==
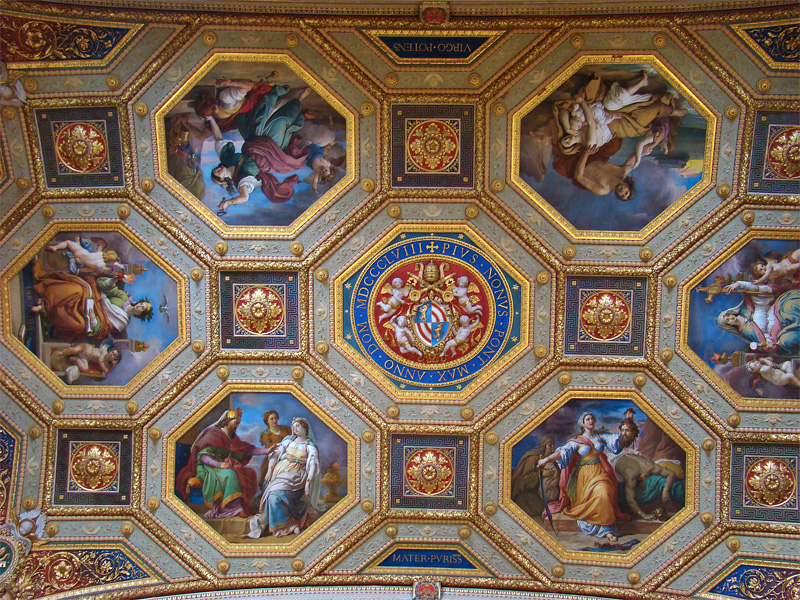
Ceiling Frescoes in sala dell'Immacolata in Vatican Museum

He dedicated himself to the execution of a series of portraits of nobles and cardinals Lombard and Roman. He then moved into a large studio where he worked until 1869.

Commissioned by the House of Savoy, he painted Judgment of Solomon for the Royal Palace of Turin and Henry II blesses the marriage of Emanuale Filiberto of Savoy for the residence in Agliè. Carlo Alberto of Savoy nominated Podesti to direct the Academy of Fine Arts in Turin, but he refused, fearing that the appointment could somehow limit his freedom as an artist. While in Turin, Podesti married Clotilde Cagiati. They had six children; three, however, died in infancy. One, Amalia, had a small tomb made in Santa Maria sopra Minerva.

In the 1840s he painted other paintings of historical subject, including Ludovico il Moro talks to Leonardo for the King of Naples Francis II, which gained him also a membership to Academy of Fine Arts in Naples. In 1849, while the brief Roman Republic was established, Podesti joined the battalion of the university defending the city of Rome from sieges by French forces.

In 1851 the municipality of Ancona asked Podesti for a painting to be placed in the Council Chamber. The artist chose an episode during the 1174 siege of Ancona by the imperial troops of Christian von Buch, Archchancellor of Germany: the large canvas masterpiece depicting the Oath of Anconetani won prizes at the Great Exhibition in London of 1851 as well as the Exposition Universelle in Paris in 1855. In 1856, it was hung in the Palace of the Elders in Ancona (now is located in the Civic Art Gallery). The work merges neoclassical and Romantic styles.

In 1855, the year of the proclamation of the Dogma of the Immaculate Conception by Pope Pius IX, Podesti was commissioned to paint the Hall of the Immaculate Conception in the Vatican, depicting events leading to the announcement. He accepted the commission as a great responsibility, because the dining fresco is contiguous to Raphael Rooms. During the eleven years it took to paint the room, he had a few clashes with the curia, who wanted to delete the depiction of one disgraced priest. Podesti however, was adamant, referring to the obligation of fidelity to historical reality.

He narrated later the event:

The monsignor said, "That picture there is now an indignity, for the Pope's sake, remove that face!" "No, I can not Monsignor, remember that while Judas betrayed Christ, in the representations of the Last Supper, no one has ever required that he not be represented!" The argument was compelling enough to silence the prelate

— Francesco Podesti, Memorie, 1854 (?)

His wife died in 1865, and Podesti realized the only major work of sculpture for her burial plot in the Campo Verano, the main cemetery of Rome.

In 1877 he painted for the Earl Ragnini, a historical subject Stamira, portraying the heroine from Ancona that burned the enemy siege machines during the conflict mentioned in the Oath of Anconetani. The painting was ultimately donated to the city of Bertinoro, to recall the intervention of Aldruda de Frangipani, a native of that town. The canvas is placed today in the office of Mayor of Bertinoro.

In 1870 he made one of his last masterpieces: the Martyrdom of St. Sebastian for Porto Maurizio. He had a serene old age among friends and family (three children and many grandchildren), being tirelessly active. He was 80 years old when he ascended the scaffolding to fresco the four evangelists on the spandrels of the dome of the church of the Blessed Sacrament in Ancona. In 1883 he was still exhibiting at expositions. He died in Rome.

Francesco's brother, Vincenzo Podesti (1812–1897), was also a painter. At the Academy, Aurelio Tiratelli was his pupil. His main pupils were the painters from Messina Giacomo Conti and Ferdinando Cicconi.

== Legacy ==
Francesco Podesti died in Rome in 1896. One hundred years after his death, a retrospective exhibition was held in his native Ancona, gathering about a hundred works from all over Italy. The exhibition was an opportunity for new studies on Podesti, his works and the nineteenth-century Italian painting. The Civic Art Gallery in Ancona is named after the painter. It was founded with this interest and donations.

== Main works ==
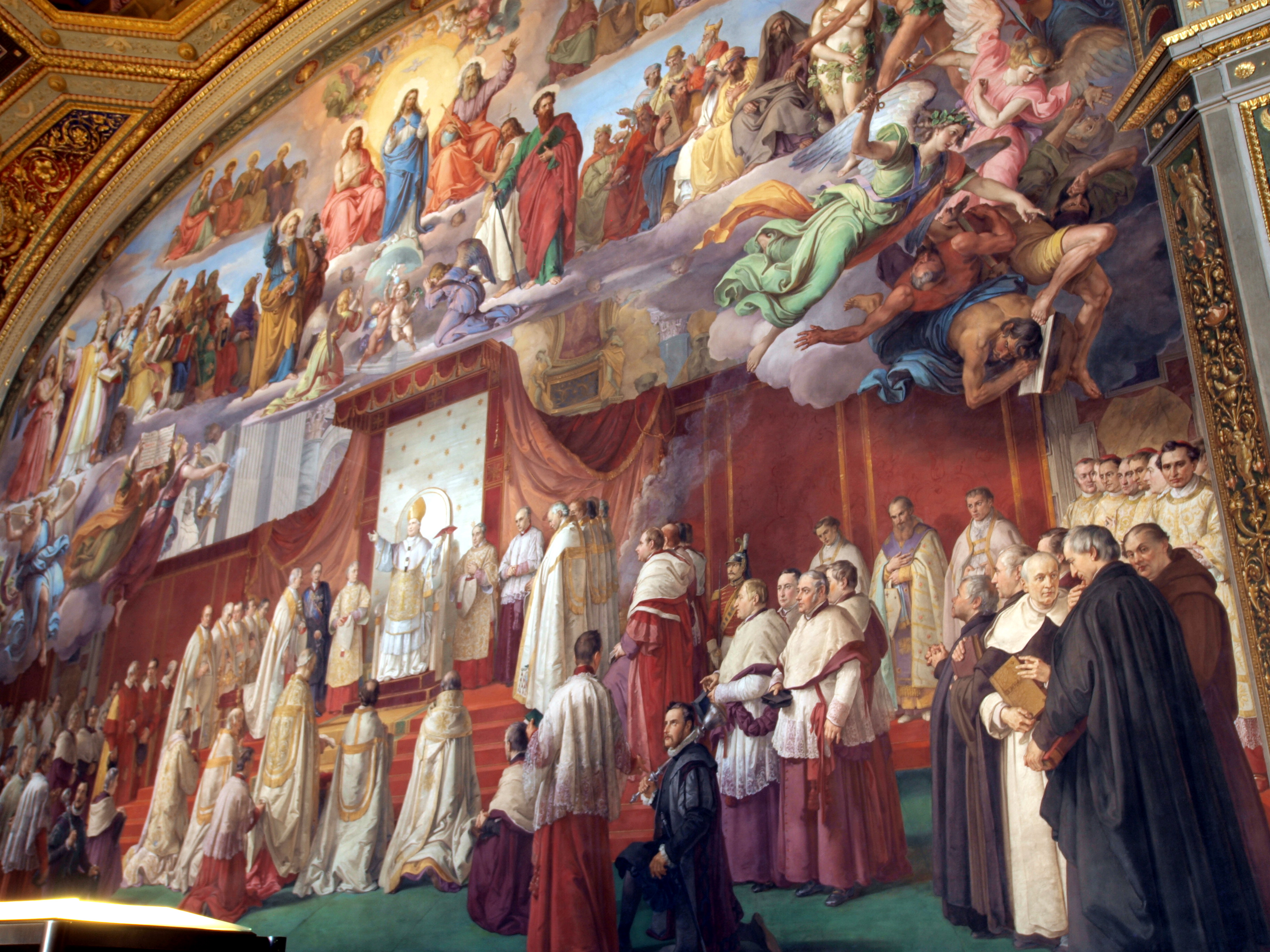
Hall of the Immaculate Conception in the Vatican Museum

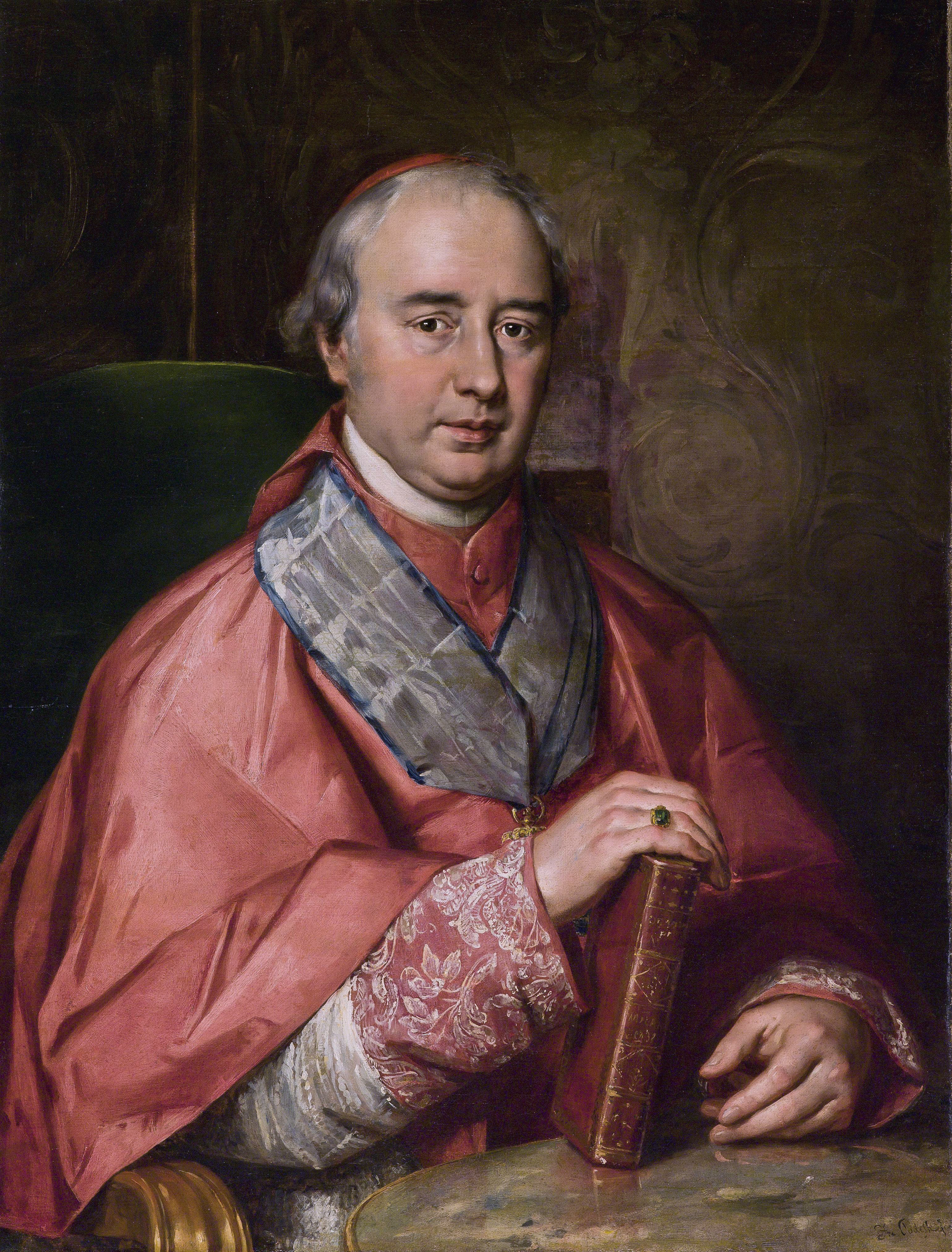
Ludovico Gazzoli

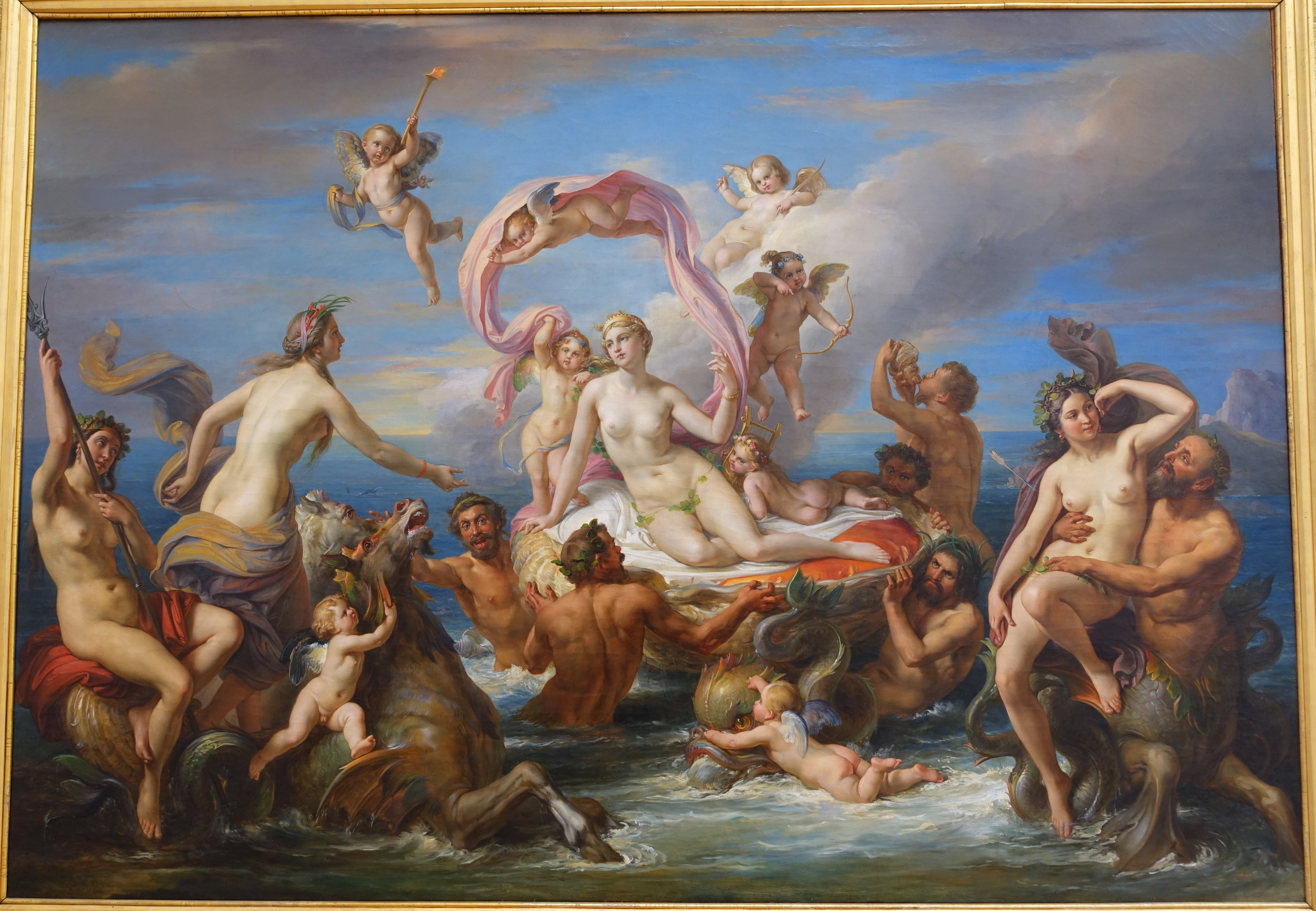
The Triumph of Venus, Galleria nazionale d'arte moderna, Rome

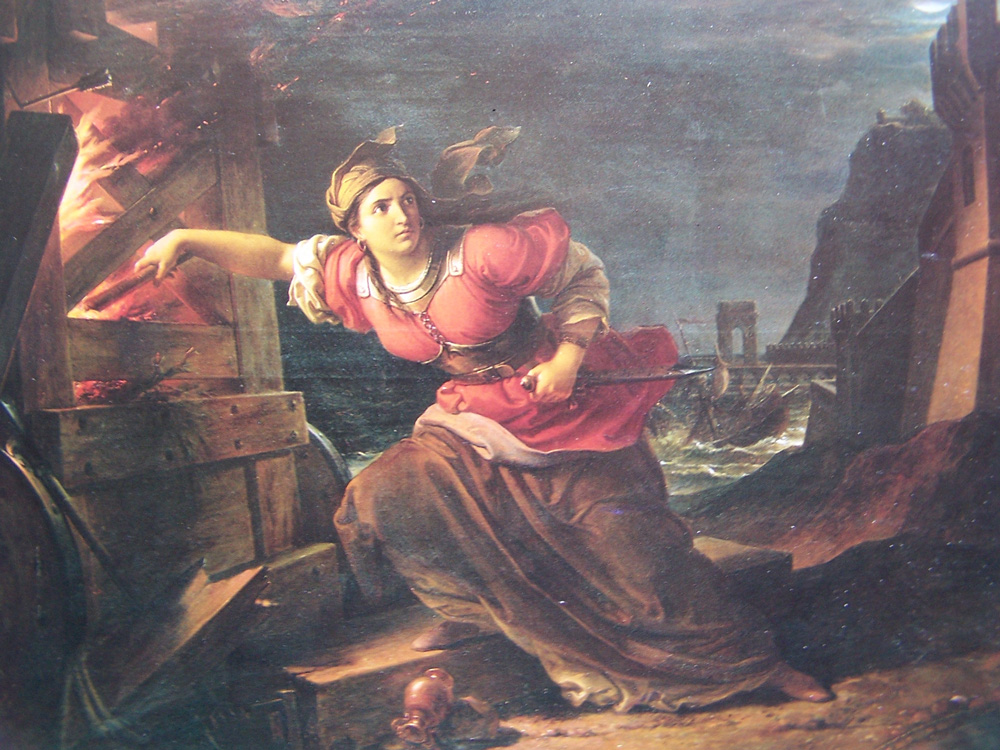
Stamira, Bertinoro, city Hall

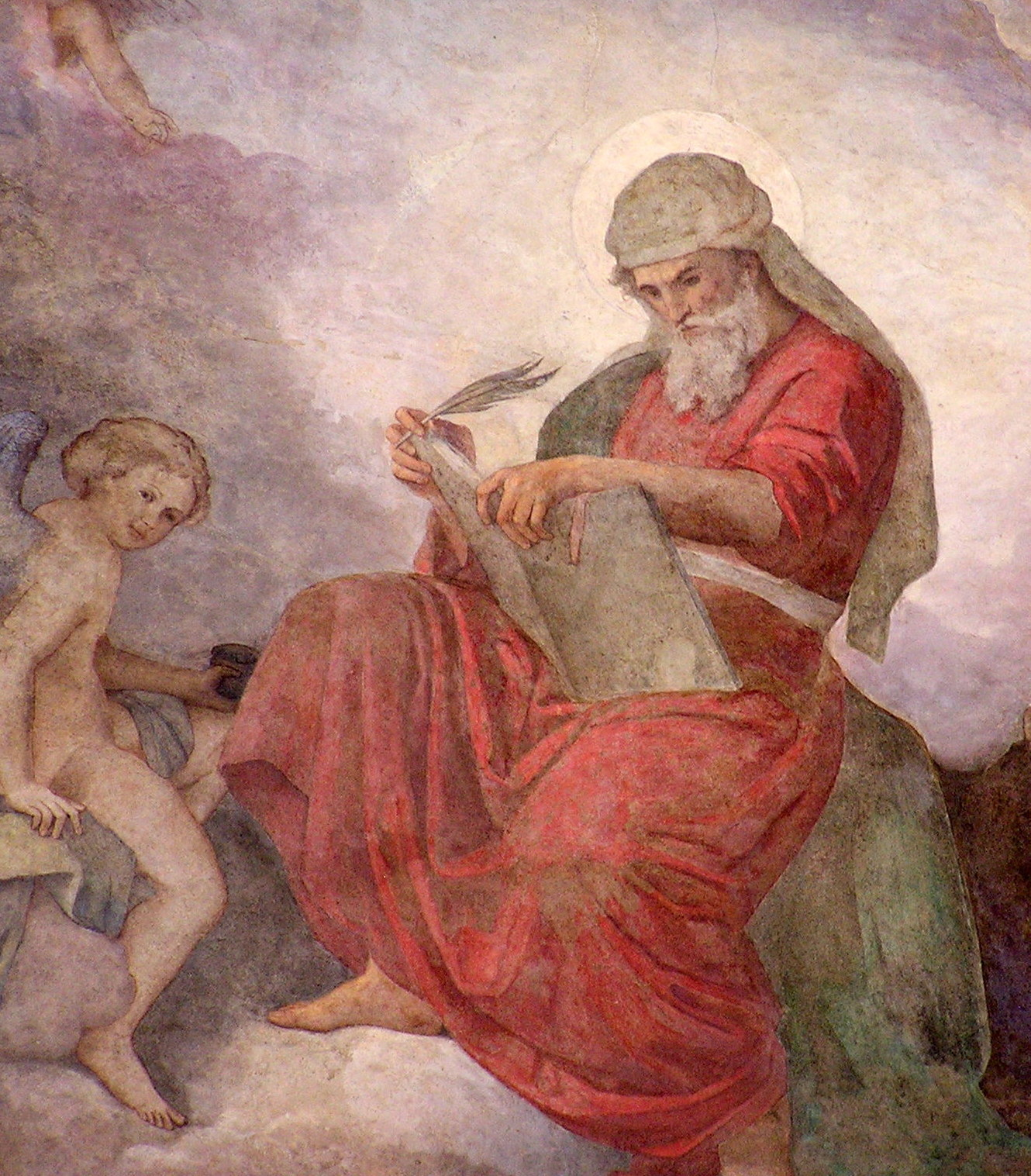
St. Mark the Evangelist - Ancona, Church of Blessed Sacrament (fresco)

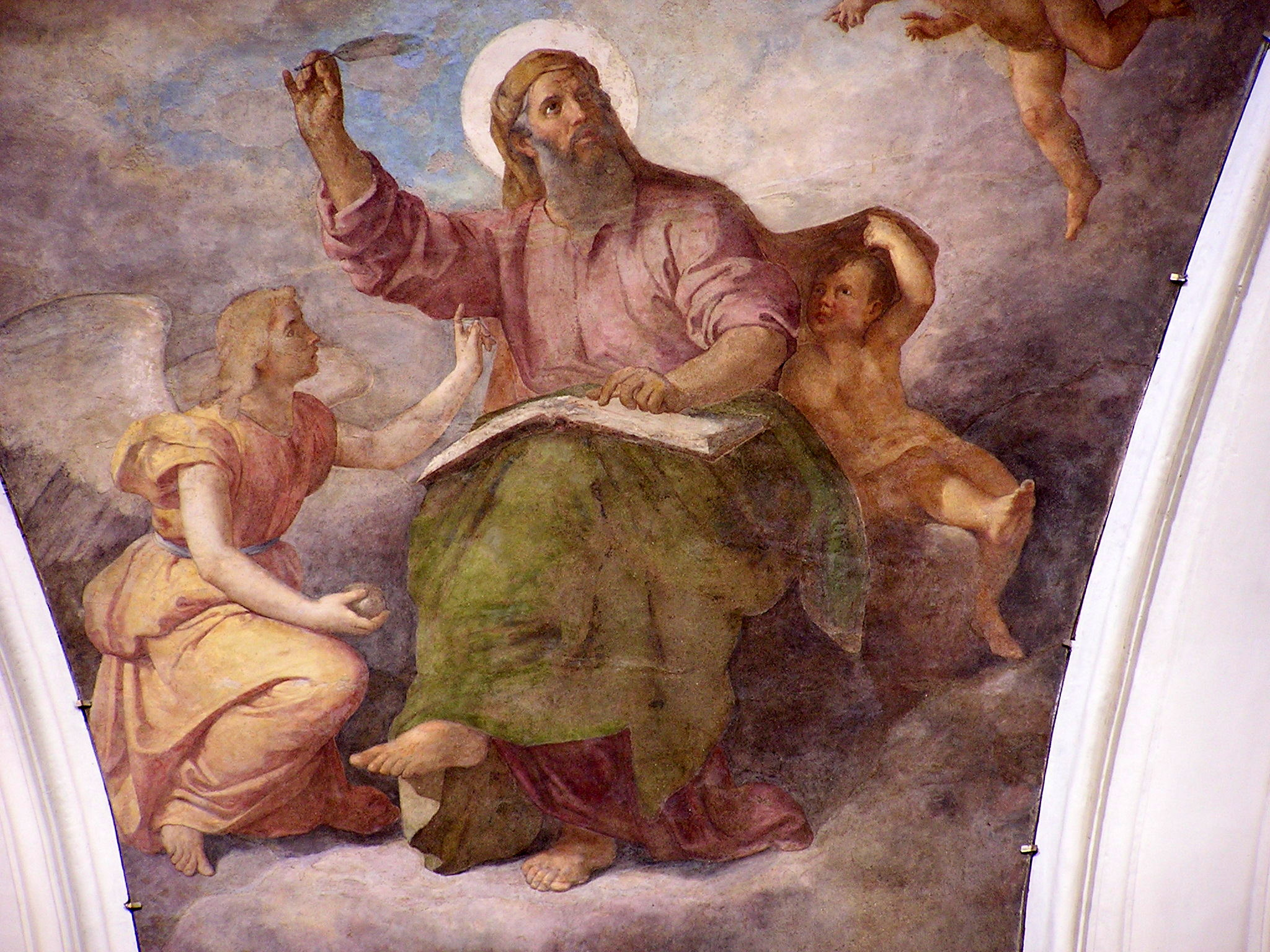
St. Mattew the Evangelist - Ancona, Church of Blessed Sacrament (fresco)

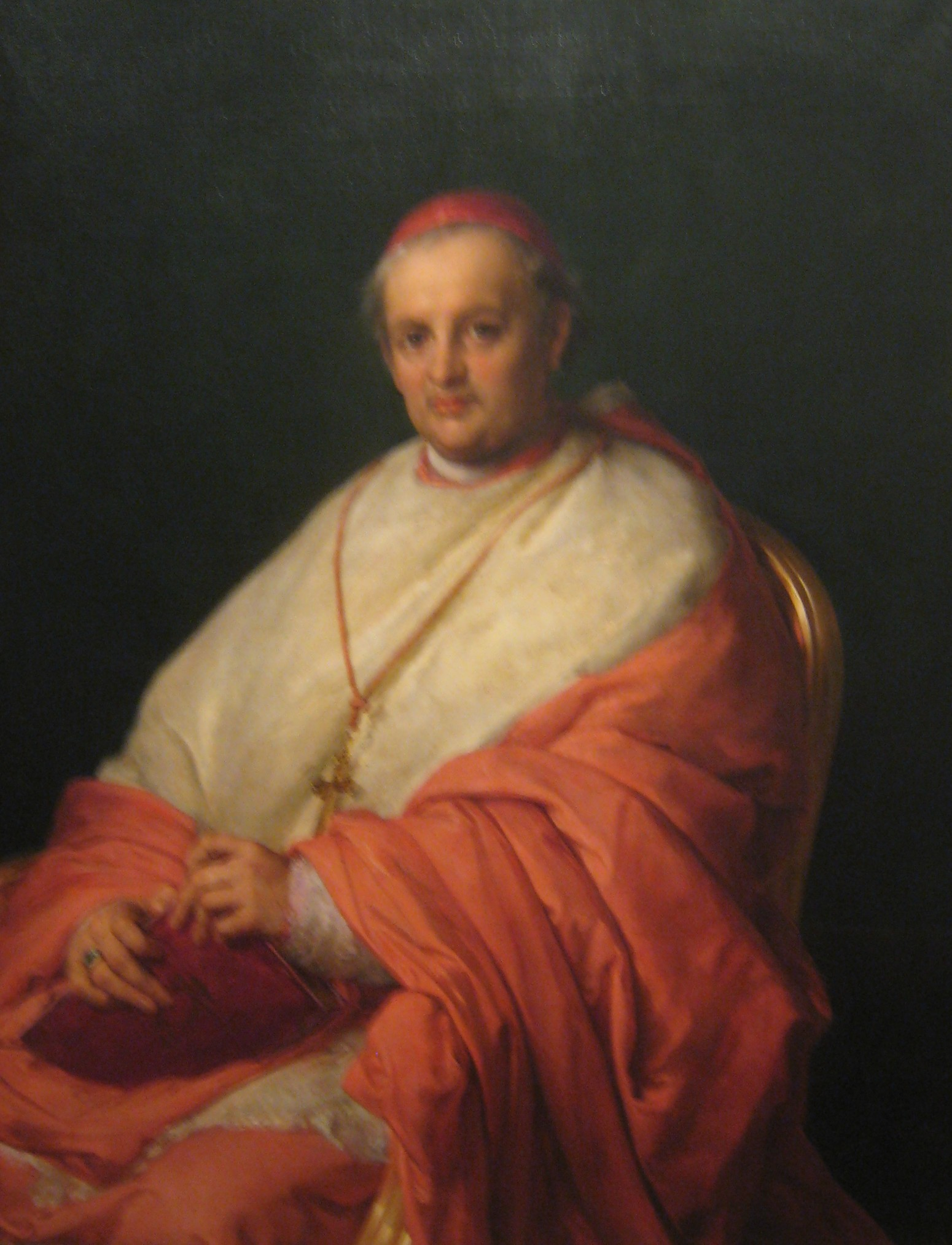
Cardinal Ignazio Cadolini

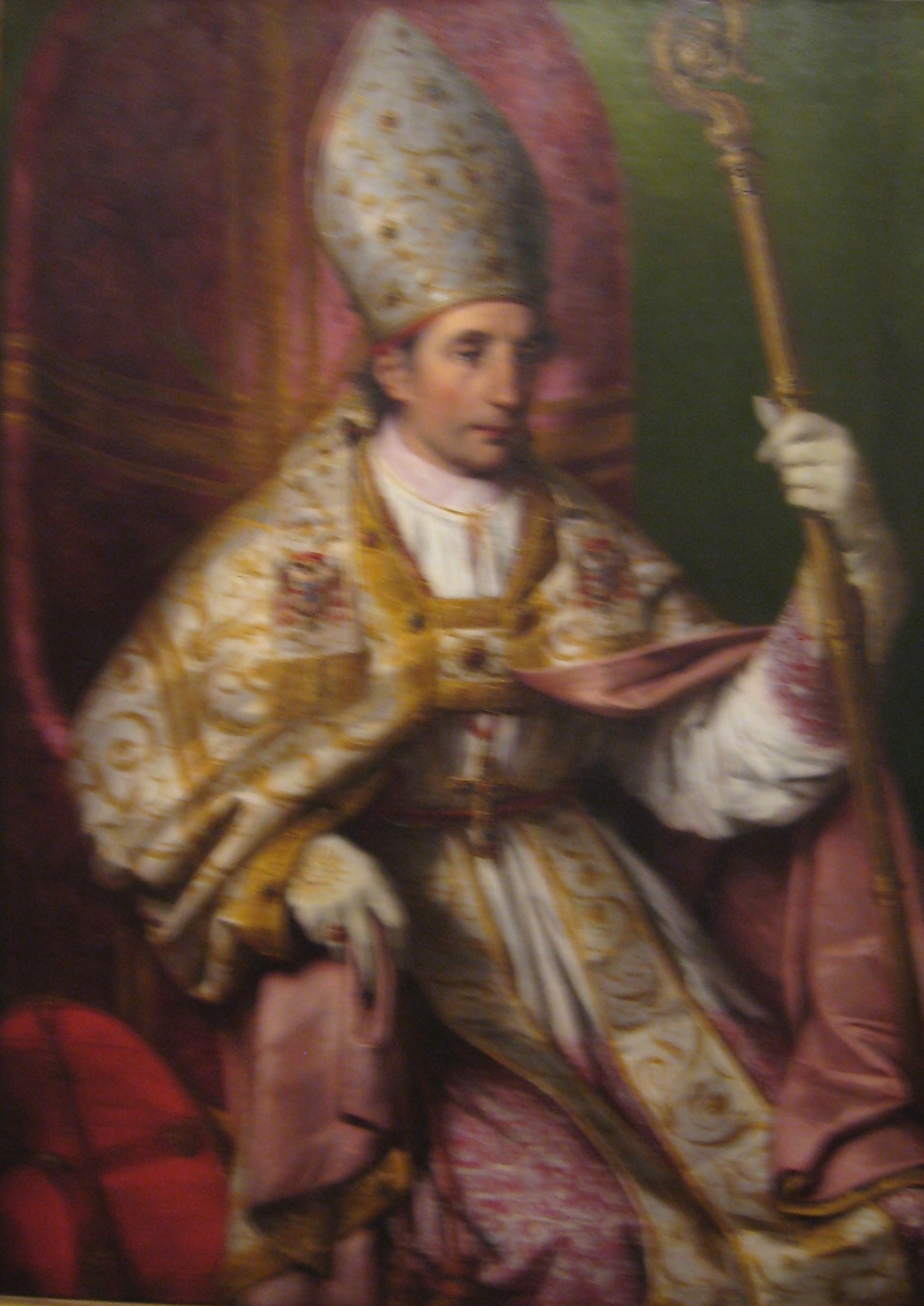
Cardinal Cesare Nembrini

The angel-judge who rewards the good soul and punishes the guilty one, Museo Nacional de San Carlos, Mexico City

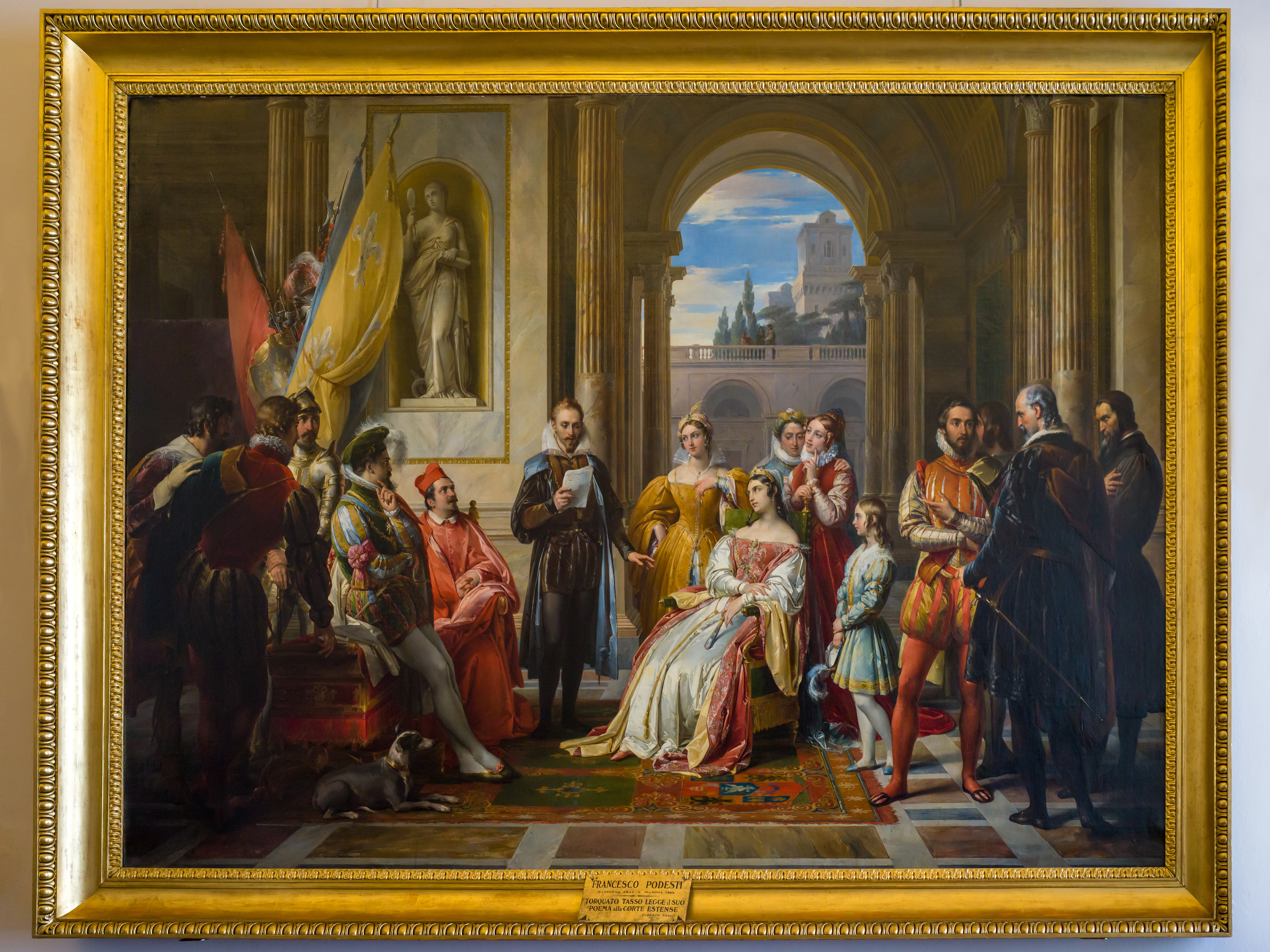
Torquato Tasso reads his poem at the Ferrara court. Painting in the Palazzo Tosio, Brescia.

== Oil paintings on canvas ==
- Eteocles and Polynices, 1824 (Pinacoteca Podesti, Ancona)
- Portrait of the Marquis Busca, 1825 (Florence, private collection)
- Portrait of Joseph Girometti, 1831? (Galleria Nazionale d'Arte Moderna, Rome)
- Portrait of Mariano Plomer (Pinacoteca civica Francesco Podesti, Ancona)
- Torquato Tasso recites Gerusalemme Liberata (Pinacoteca Podesti, Ancona)
- Portrait of Cardinal Angelo Mai (Bergamo, City Hall)
- Torquato Tasso in Ferrara (Pinacoteca Tosio Martinengo, Brescia)
- The Judgment of Solomon (Royal Palace of Turin)
- Leonardo presents his thoughts on the Last Supper to Ludovico il Moro (Reggia di Caserta)
- The Oath of the Anconetani, 1850 ca. (Town hall, Ancona)
- Martyrdom of St. Stefano, 1851, ( Basilica di San Paolo fuori le mura, Rome)
- The storytellers of the Decameron ( Museo civico Luigi Bailo, Treviso)
- Portrait of the poet Elizabeth Barrett Browning with her young son Robert ( Galleria d'Arte Moderna di Palazzo Pitti, Florence)
- The meeting of Venus and Galatea (Galleria Nazionale d'Arte Moderna, Rome)
- Martyrdom of St. Sebastian, 1870 (Basilica of San Maurizio (Porto Maurizio), Imperia)
- Stamira burns the enemy ships, 1877 (Civic residence, Bertinoro)

=== Frescoes ===
- Stories of Bacchus, Villa Torlonia, Rome. (1835).
- Palazzo Torlonia. When redesigning Piazza Venezia the building was demolished; some frescoes were saved by tearing, others were auctioned off and others are still preserved, only as cartoons. Before destruction, works in the palace were photographed. The Museum of Rome at Palazzo Braschi preserves surviving frescoes, pictures and some boxes, other boxes are the Pinacoteca Podesti.

*Deeds of the Olympians (in the arm of Canova). (1836, first floor gallery, at the end of which was placed the sculpture of Hercules and Lichas by Canova, now in Galleria Nazionale d'Arte Moderna, Rome)
* The Seasons guided by the Hours (1838, second floor).
* The myth of Diana (1838, second floor).

- Hall of the Immaculate within the Vatican Museums. (1855–1864)

*Discussion about Mary conceived without sin
*Proclamation of the Dogma
*Coronation of the Effigy of the Virgin by Pius IX
*Sybils, stories and allegories
*Allegory of Faith
*Allegory of Theology
*The Shipwreck of Noah's Ark
*Jael killing Sisera
*Esther fainting before Ahasuerus
*Judith with the Head of Holofernes

- Palazzo Busca-Serbelloni, in Milan.
  - Stories Psyche
  - Dance of the Hours. (Destroyed by bombing during Second World War, boxed shards are stored at Francesco Podesti Civic Art Gallery, Ancona
- Birth of Venus. (Destroyed by bombing during Second World War)
- The Four Evangelists (1880, Church of the Blessed Sacrament, Ancona)

== Sources ==
- History of Modern Italian Art, (1900) by Ashton Rollins Willard page 322-330
