= Stamira =

Legendary figure who saved the Italian city of Ancona from invasion in 1173

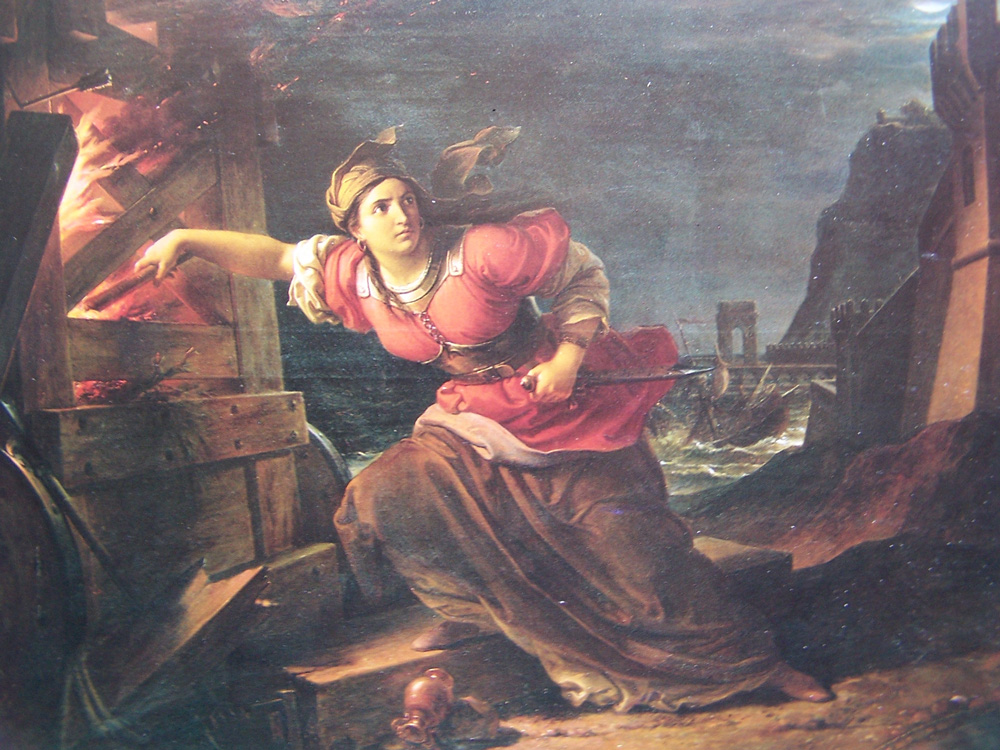
"Stamira", 1877 painting by Francesco Podesti.

Stamira (sometimes spelled Stamura) (date of birth unknown – Ancona, 1 September 1173) was, according to a long-standing tradition, a heroic self-sacrificing woman who saved the city of Ancona during the 1173 siege by Holy Roman Emperor Frederick Barbarossa. Her memory was later taken up prominently by Italian nationalism.

== Background ==
Emperor Frederick Barbarossa bore a long-standing grudge against Ancona, one of the Italian maritime republics, for its assertion of independence. Ancona had already stubbornly and successfully resisted an earlier attempt at Imperial occupation in 1167. Moreover, to counterbalance the power of the Holy Roman Empire, the Anconans made a voluntary submission to the Byzantine Emperor Manuel I Komnenos, and the Byzantines maintained representatives in the city.

In the latter part of May 1173 the Imperial forces, commanded by Christian von Buch, Archbishop of Mainz, laid siege to Ancona. In preparation for this step, the imperial troops had previously requested and obtained a naval alliance with the Republic of Venice. Despite the ongoing conflict between the Empire and the Italian cities of the Lombard League, Venice among them, Venice was happy to seize this occasion to rid itself of Ancona, a long time rival for the maritime trade in the Adriatic and Mediterranean Seas. The combination of the Imperial Army by land and the Venetian Navy by sea presented the Republic of Ancona with a formidable challenge.

== Stamira's heroic self-sacrifice ==
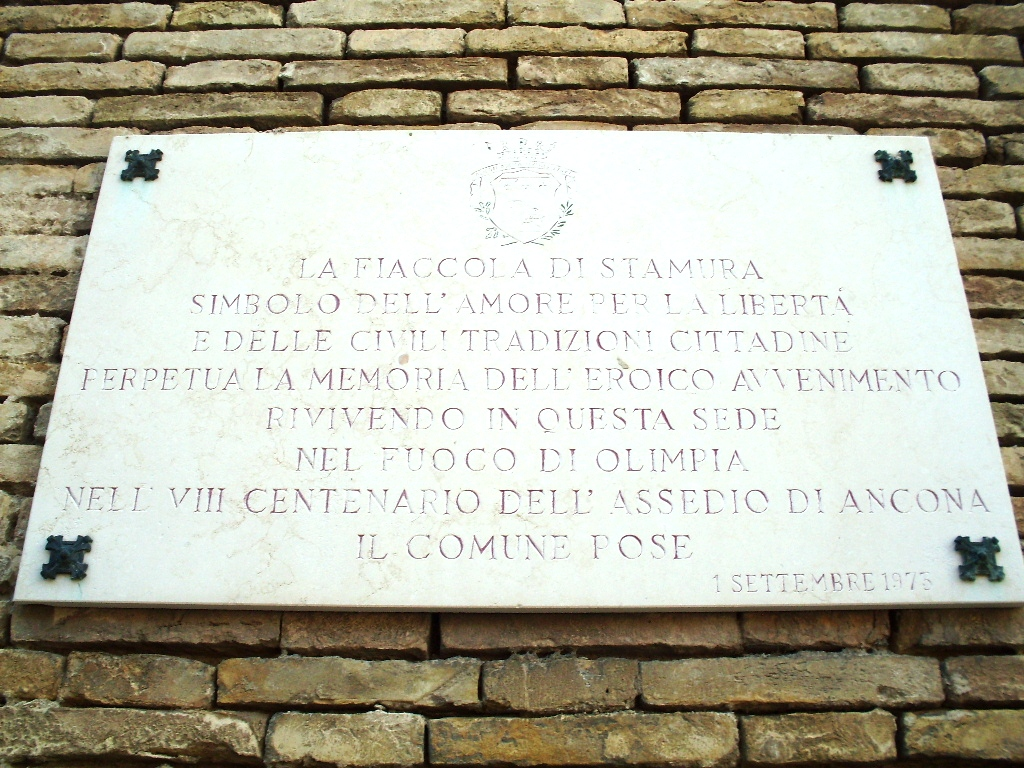
Memorial plaque to Stamira placed at the 18th Century building of the Lazzaretto of Ancona.

The siege lasted over four months. During a particularly dire moment of the siege, Ancona inhabitants staged a short sortie and managed to throw a barrel containing resin and pitch in front of the besiegers - but it was very dangerous to light it. It was at this moment that the widow Stamira boldly came out of the walls, wielding an ax with which she broke the barrel and set it on fire, thus destroying part of the besiegers' war machines – but at the price of herself being killed. Thanks to this sacrifice, the Ancona inhabitants were able to leave the walls for a short time, so that they could supply themselves with food and continue the resistance of the city.

This bought Ancona time until mid-October, when reinforcements came from Ancona's allies Aldruda Frangipane, Countess of Bertinoro, and Guglielmo Marcheselli, Guelph Chief of Ferrara. The arrival of these forces caused the Imperial and Venetian troops to lift the siege.

== Later depictions ==
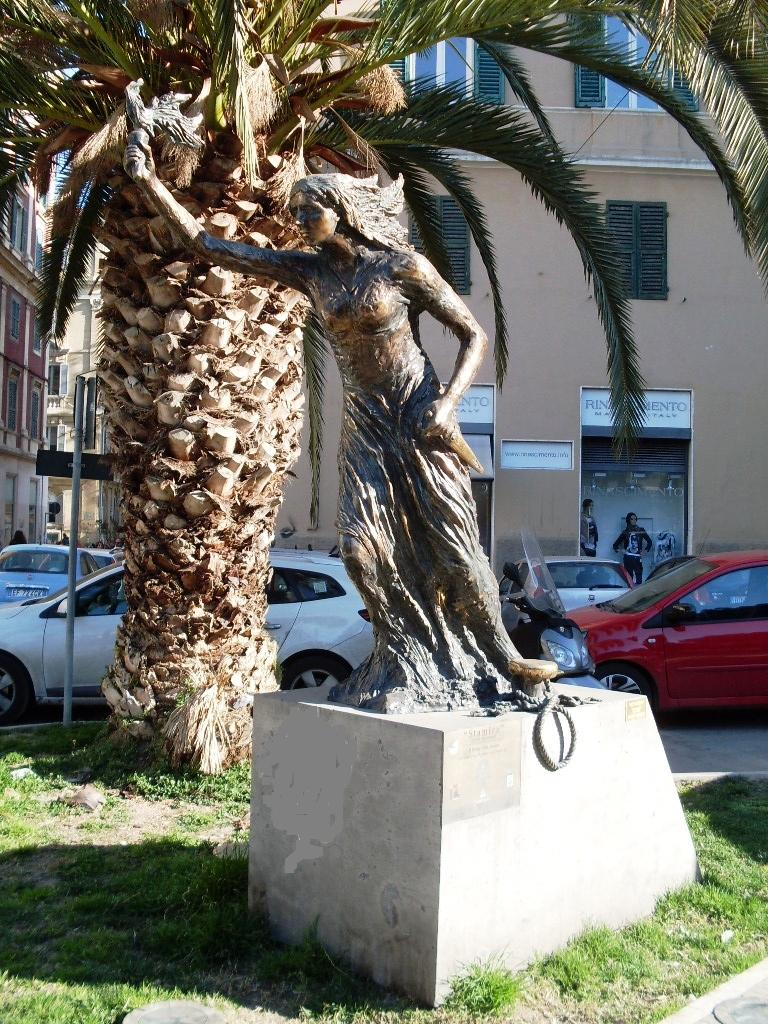
The Statue of Stamira erected at the Piazza Stamira, Ancona

The events of the 1173 siege – including Stamira's heroic act – were narrated some years later, in 1204, by Boncompagno da Signa, in the Liber de Obsidione Anconae. Of this, three copies remain: one is kept in the Vatican, the second in the National Library of Paris and the third remained unpublished until 1723, when it was bought by Father Auriberti of Brescia, from which the text was translated and published by the historian Ludovico Antonio Muratori in 1725. In the Nineteenth Century this copy was again sold and transferred to Cleveland, Ohio.

Muratori, after long research on Italian history – especially on the Medieval Period – published the "Annals of Italy", a major work recounting Italian history up to 1749, and giving considerable attention to the Heroine of Ancona. Muratori called her “Stamura”, and this version of her name was long current.

In 1848 the publisher Pier Carlo Soldi of Florence brought out the novel “The Siege of Ancona in The Year 1174” by the Italian Nationalist writer Giuseppe Cannonieri of Modena, written while Cannonieri was living in exile at Blois, France. In this account the story of Stamira/Stamura is made into a full-fledged historical novel in the manner of Alexandre Dumas.

“Stamura" is given as her family name. The heroine's first name is given as Maria, and she has a daughter named Virginia. She is the widow of Pietro Stamura, a Milanese citizen, who for being opposed to the troops of Barbarossa, was brutally tortured and killed together with other Lombard patriots. (The manner of his death is described at great and horrifying detail). At the time of her heroic self-sacrifice, Maria Stamura is engaged to Guglielmo Gosia, son of Martino, Mayor of Ancona, and is a friend of the priest Don Giovanni da Chiò, another hero of the siege of 1173.

All of the above details are entirely fictional, derived from 19th Century invention. Of the actual historical woman, hardly anything is known beyond the bare fact of her having been a widow. Still, the fictional account had a considerable popularity during the struggle for Italian Unification. Since that time, she is often characterized as “An Italian Patriot” though this designation is an anachronism when applied to a person who lived at a time when Italy was divided into numerous, often mutually-hostile principalities and city states.

In 1877 Francesco Podesti, himself a native of Ancona, made for the Earl Ragnini a painting of Stamira. Another Podesti painting depicted The Oath of The Anconetani, also an incident of the same 1173 siege. The Stamira painting was eventually donated to the city of Bertinoro, in appreciation of the intervention of Aldruda Frangipane, Countess of Bertinoro, which ultimately helped lift the siege. The canvas is placed at present at the office of Mayor of Bertinoro.

== Debate on the correct spelling of her name ==
Due to the great popularity of Cannonieri's work, especially widely disseminated in mid-Nineteenth Century Italy, “Stamura” was the commonly accepted version of her name.

However, the vernacular poet Ferruccio Marchetti, in an essay entitled “Stamira or Stamura?” pointed out that “Stamira” must be the correct version of her name, based on the specific grammatical rules of the Ancona Dialect. In 1936 Palermo Giangiacomi, self-taught historian and Ancona City Councilor, convinced the municipal administration to accordingly change the name in the public locations commemorating her.

== Bibliography (in Italian) ==
- Giuseppe Cannonieri, L'assedio di Ancona dell'anno 1174, Tipografia Niccolai 1848, Firenze.
- Chiara Censi, Stamira. L'eroina di Ancona tra storia e leggenda, Ancona, edizioni laboratorio culturale di Ancona, 2004.
- Paolo Grillo, Le guerre del Barbarossa, Laterza, Bari, 2014.

== See also ==
- Republic of Ancona#History
