= Boncompagno da Signa =

Italian scholar

Boncompagno da Signa (also Boncompagnus or Boncompagni; c. 1165/1175 – after 1240) was an Italian scholar, grammarian, historian, and philosopher.

Born in Signa, near Florence, between 1165 and 1175, he was a professor of rhetoric (ars dictaminis) at the University of Bologna and then the University of Padua.

In the early thirteenth century, he was one of the first Western European authors to write in the vernacular, in his case Italian. He spent his career travelling between Ancona, Venice, and Bologna and died at Florence. He wrote a history of the 1173 Siege of Ancona, his only work of that kind, and works on chess. His love of elaborate practical jokes is described by Helen Waddell in The Wandering Scholars (1927).

The events of the 1173 Siege of Ancona were narrated in 1204 in da Signa's ‘’Liber de Obsidione Anconae’’. This book especially made widely known the self-sacrifice of the widow Stamira, who had a major role in saving the city. Of this book, three copies remain: one is kept in the Vatican, the second in the National Library of Paris and the third remained unpublished until 1723, when it was bought by Father Auriberti of Brescia, from which the text was translated and published by the historian Ludovico Antonio Muratori in 1725. In the Nineteenth Century this copy was again sold and transferred to Cleveland, Ohio.

== Works ==
- Tractatus virtutum
- Rhetorica novissima
- Palma
- Quinque tabulae salutationum
- Rota veneris
- Bonus Socius e Civis Bononiae (disputed authorship)
- Liber de Obsidione Ancone

== Sources ==
- Boncompagno da Signa. 1975. Rota veneris, facs. ed. Scholars' Facsimiles and Reprints: ISBN 978-0-8201-1137-7.
- Cortijo Ocaña, Antonio. Boncompagno da Signa. El ‘Tratado del amor carnal’ o ‘Rueda de Venus’. Motivos literarios en la tradición sentimental y celestinesca (ss. XIII-XVI). Pamplona: Eunsa, 2002.
- Cortijo Ocaña, Antonio. Boncompagno da Signa. La rueda del amor. Los males de la vejez y la senectud. La amistad. Madrid: Gredos (Bliblioteca Clásica Gredos), 2005.
