= Christian I (archbishop of Mainz) =

German prelate and nobleman (1165 to 1183)

- Archbishop of Mainz
- Church: Catholic Church
- Diocese: Archdiocese of Mainz
- In office: 1165–1183

Personal details
- Born: c. 1130
- Died: 23 August 1183

Christian I (c. 1130 – 23 August 1183), sometimes Christian von Buch, was a German prelate and nobleman. He was Archbishop of Mainz and Archchancellor of Germany from 1165 until his death in 1183. He was originally elected archbishop in 1160 in a disputed election. He served the Emperor Frederick I as a diplomat in Italy on two occasions.

== Biography ==
Christian was of the family of Beichlingen and ruled the small county of Bucha. He entered the church under the patronage of Louis II, Landgrave of Thuringia, who helped him to the position of cathedral provost of Merseburg. In 1160, with the murder of the Archbishop Arnold of Mainz, Mainz was placed under an interdict. Some of the cathedral's canons fled to Frankfurt and there elected Christian archbishop. Others, however, elected Rudolf of Zähringen. The Emperor Frederick Barbarossa, however, convened the Synod of Lodi and had Pope Victor IV depose both candidates and raise Conrad of Wittelsbach to the episcopal seat on 20 June 1161.

=== First trip into Italy ===
Christian became provost of Mainz Cathedral in 1162, as well as in Basilica of Saint Servatius in Maastricht, and accompanied the emperor on his Italian expedition of 1163. In 1165, Conrad of Wittelsbach refused to recognise the imperial antipope, Paschal III. Frederick and Paschal immediately appointed Christian to the bishopric and he was recognised throughout the empire, but not by Pope Alexander III. The Diet of Würzburg was held, proclaiming Frederick's intentions. Christian marched into Latium, harassed the Romans, procured a treaty whereby they would recognise Paschal, and sacked Anagni. In 1167, Frederick set out to impose Paschal in the Lateran by force, and Christian accompanied him. On 4 March, he was consecrated priest and the next day, bishop.

Christian then set out on the warpath. He ferociously repressed Narni for opposing the emperor and Paschal. Then, in May, the Romans amassed a large army of 40,000 and besieged Tusculum, where the imperialist Count Raino called in the forces of Rainald of Dassel, the archbishop of Cologne and archchancellor of Italy. Help was then requested from Christian, then in Ancona. With 1,300 Germans and Brabantines, and the men of Robert II of Bassunvilla, Christian encamped beside Monte Porzio outside the city. The Romans spurned all attempts by Christian at diplomatic resolution and attacked. The momentous Battle of Monte Porzio took place on May 29. The Roman and Papal troops were defeated, Tusculum preserved, and the road opened to Rome. The emperor and his antipope entered Rome, but the onset of malarial weather cut down 2,000 men, including Rainald of Dassel. Christian was appointed archchancellor of Italy in his place. The next year, he assisted the Romans in razing Albano.

=== Diplomat ===
After returning to Germany, where he made one of only two visits of his career to Mainz, he mediated between Frederick and the Saxon duke Henry the Lion. In 1168, he was in Rouen, mediating between Henry II of England and Louis VII of France. It was Christian's idea to crown Frederick's son Henry as King of the Romans at Bamberg in June 1169. He also tried to end the Great Schism between Eastern and Western churches, which brought him to Greece in 1170 as an ambassador of the Holy Roman Emperor. In 1177, he was one of the chief negotiators of the Treaty of Venice between Emperor and Pope, in which the Emperor formally acknowledged Alexander as pope and abandoned his own antipope, Callistus III. He thus received the recognition of Alexander III and received the pallium.

=== Second trip into Italy ===
Not only a diplomat, in 1171, Christian had accompanied Frederick into Italy again. He attacked all cities aligned with Alexander. Allied with Venice, he besieged Ancona in 1173, but was forced to retreat; the widow Stamira, later accounted an Italian national heroine, had an important role in the city's resistance. In 1174, he sacked Terni and in 1176, Fermo.

On 12 March 1178, Christian escorted the pope into Rome. He then besieged Viterbo, where the Antipope Callistus III was staying. He forced his surrender to Alexander and the subjection of the city, which had begged the assistance of Conrad of Montferrat. In March 1179, he took part in the Third Lateran Council, which reversed all the acts of Paschal III. He then turned to defend Viterbo from Conrad, whom he captured and who then captured him at Camerino in September and held him prisoner for fifteen months in the castle of San Flaviano, then in Rocca Venere, and finally in Acquapendente. According to the Byzantine historian Niketas Choniates, Conrad benefited from the financial support of the Emperor Manuel I Komnenos and was prepared to send his captive to Constantinople as a hostage, but Manuel finally refused the suggestion. After Christian's liberation he continued in Viterbo, even taking in the pope, who had left Rome.

In 1181, when Pope Lucius III likewise fled the city, Christian came to his assistance at Tusculum, which the Romans were besieging. He defeated the Romans twice and saved the pope and the city once again. He caught the same malarial fever which had killed 2,000 after Monte Porzio, though Roger of Hoveden suggests he drank from a poisoned fountain. He died at Tusculum and was buried there. Conrad of Wittelsbach was again made archbishop of Mainz.

Christian was a diplomat and a soldier, never a prelate, throughout his life. His legacy and character are summed up by Gregorovius:

Christian [...] was one of the greatest princes of his age, [...] a jovial knight until his death, kept a harem of beautiful girls, and, clad in glittering armour, rode a splendid horse, swinging the battle axe with which he shattered the helmet and head of many an enemy [...] He spoke several languages [...] The asses in his army were more luxuriously cared for than the servants of the Emperor.

.

== Sources ==
- Gregorovius, Ferdinand (1905). Rome in the Middle Ages Vol. IV Part II.
- Boncompagno da Signa. The History of the Siege of Ancona.

Catholic Church titles
Preceded by Arnold	Archbishop of Mainz; 1160–1161 with Rudolf	Succeeded by Conrad
Preceded by Conrad	Archbishop of Mainz; 1165–1183	Succeeded by Conrad
