= Giovanni Dalmata =

15th-century Dalmatian sculptor

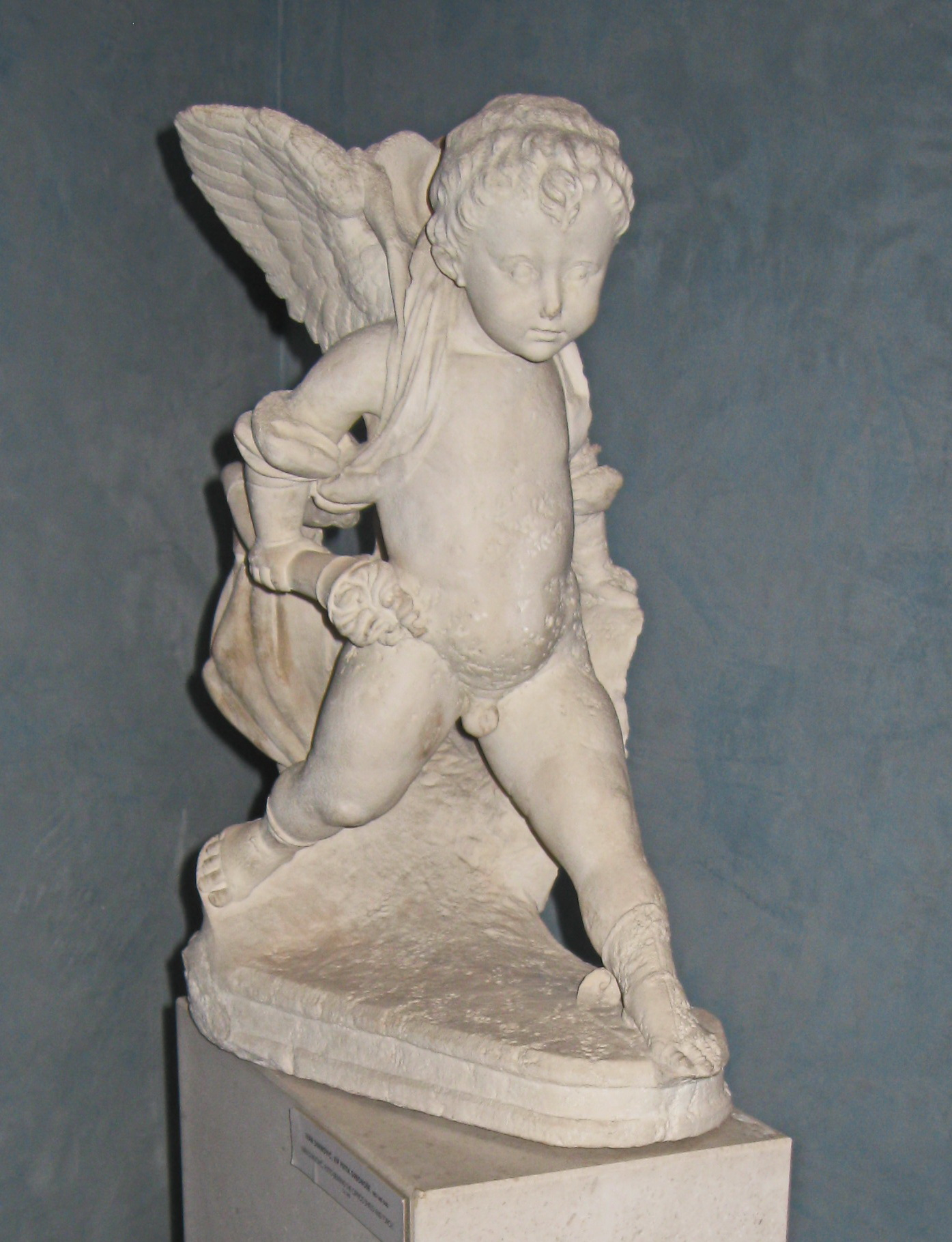
Putto bearing the Cippico shield and torch, circa 1480. Trogir City Museum

Giovanni Dalmata (Croatian: Ivan Duknović; c. 1440 – c. 1514), born Ioannes Stephani Duknovich de Tragurio, also known as Giovanni Duknovich di Traù in Italy and Ivan Stjepanov Duknović in Croatia, was a sculptor from Trogir, Dalmatia, who was mainly active in Rome, Hungary and his native country during the European Renaissance. Dalmata was, with Mino da Fiesole and Andrea Bregno, one of the leading sculptors in Rome in the second half of the 15th century.

== Biography ==
He was born in Vinišće, a Dalmatian village (now a part of Marina) in Venetian Dalmatia around 1440. His father was Stjepan Duknović, a stonemason in Trogir. He came to Rome between 1460 and 1465 to work for Pope Paul II on the Palazzo di Venezia. Other works in and around Rome include the Tempietto of S. Giacomo in Vicovaro (near Tivoli), the tomb monuments of Pope Paul II in St. Peter's (now dismantled), the tomb of Cardinal Bartolomeo della Rovere in San Clemente, the tomb of Cardinal Bernardo Eroli (now in the Grotte Vaticane).

Around 1488–1490, Giovanni went to the Court of King Matthias Corvinus in Buda, where he stayed for a few years, mastering a number of works which were unfortunately all either destroyed or badly damaged (e.g. the Fountain of Hercules in Visegrád).

After his stay in Hungary, Giovanni Dalmata returned to Trogir (Traù in Italian) where he left a number of works, most important among those is the statue of St. John the Evangelist in the Orsini Chapel in Trogir Cathedral. He is also the creator of the sculpture of St. Magdalene in the Franciscan monastery of St. Anthony on the nearby Čiovo island and worked with Niccolò Fiorentino and Andrea Alessi on the Renaissance Cippico Palace in Trogir.

Around 1503, he was in Rome again, working on the tomb of the papal protonotary Lomellino. In 1509 he executed the tomb of the Beato Giannelli for S. Ciriaco in Ancona. Some documents of 1513 and 1514 refer to one "Magistro Joanni lapicida" in Trogir where he presumably died soon afterwards.

A newly discovered work (The Virgin and Child, a marble relief) was offered on auction in London's Katz gallery and bought for £250,000 by Trogir City Museum. The authenticity of this work remains doubtful.

== Sources ==
- Johannes Röll, Giovanni Dalmata, 1994.
- The Dictionary of Art, www.groveart.com, entry by Kruno Prijatelj
