= Šibenik Cathedral =

Cathedral in Croatia

Cathedral of Saint James
- Croatian: Katedrala svetog Jakova
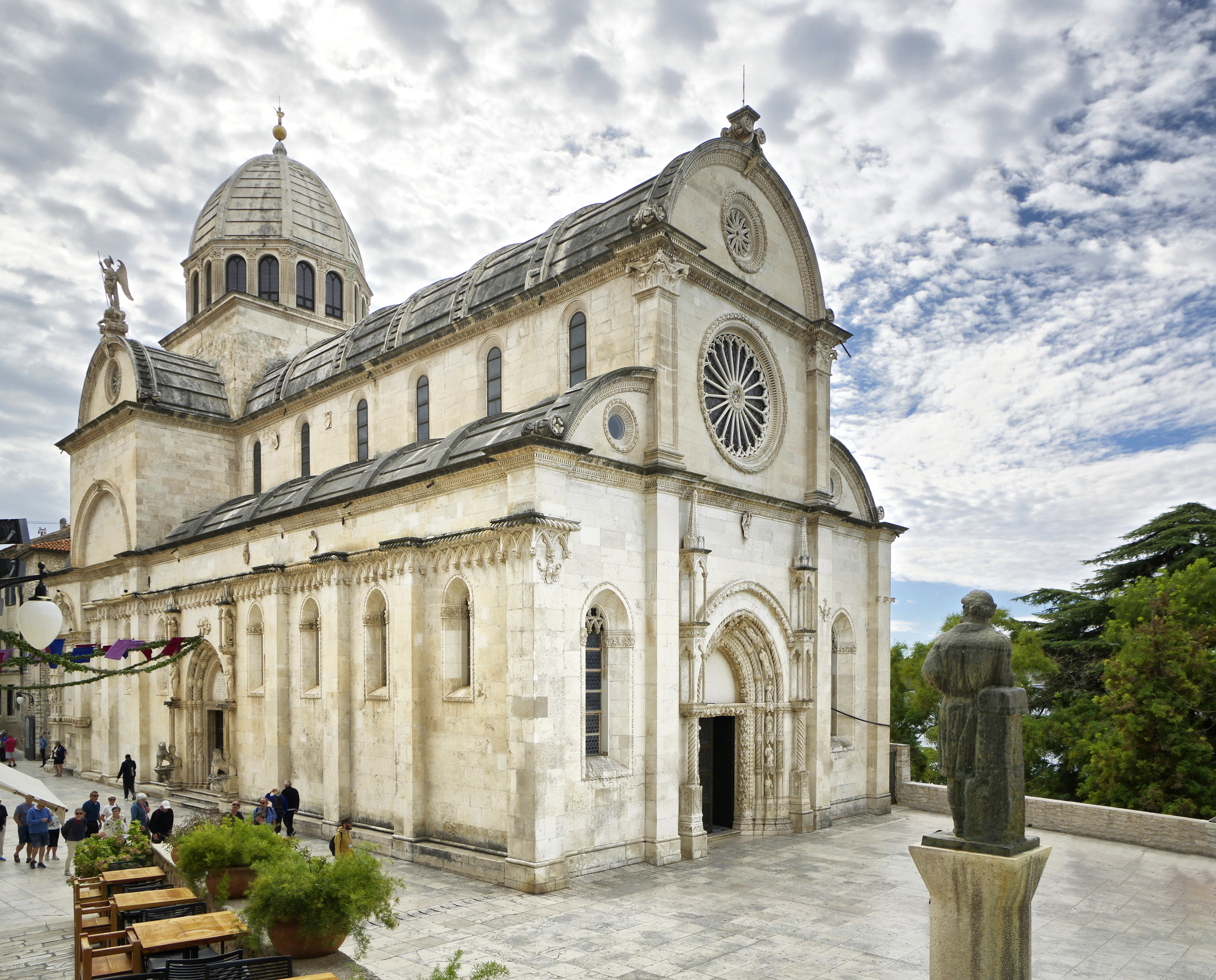
- Facade of the Cathedral
- Cathedral of Saint James
- 43°44′08″N 15°53′21″E
- Location: Trg Republike Hrvatske 1, Šibenik, Croatia
- Denomination: Roman Catholic

History
- Status: Cathedral
- Founded: 9 April 1431
- Consecrated: 1555

Architecture
- Functional status: In use
- Heritage designation: Register of Cultural Goods of Croatia
- Architect(s): Juraj Dalmatinac; Nikola Firentinac; Lorenzo Pincino
- Style: Renaissance
- Years built: 105 years
- Groundbreaking: 1431
- Completed: 1536

Specifications
- Capacity: 2,800
- Length: 38 m (125 ft)
- Width: 14 m (46 ft)
- Height: 38 m (125 ft)
- Materials: Stone

Administration
- Archdiocese: Diocese of Šibenik

UNESCO World Heritage Site
- Official name: The Cathedral of St James in Šibenik
- Criteria: i, ii, iv
- Designated: 2000 (24th Session)
- Reference no.: 963
- Region: Europe and North America

Cultural Good of Croatia
- Type: Protected cultural good
- Designated: 14 May 1963
- Reference no.: Z-2029

The Cathedral of St. James (Croatian: Katedrala sv. Jakova) or simply Šibenik Cathedral is a triple-nave Catholic cathedral with three apses and a dome (32 m high inside) in Šibenik, Croatia. It is the episcopal seat of the Diocese of Šibenik. It is often known as "St. Jacob's", because Croatian, like many other languages, uses the same name for both "James" and "Jacob". It is dedicated to Saint James the Great.

It was built entirely from stone between 1431 and 1536, the cathedral was designed by several prominent architects, most notably Juraj Dalmatinac and Nikola Firentinac, whose innovative construction techniques shaped its unique appearance. The cathedral is famous for its monumental stone dome, richly decorated portals, and the remarkable frieze of carved human heads surrounding the apses, which are considered to be individual portraits of people from Dalmatia at the time.

It is the most important architectural monument of the Renaissance in the entire country, and one of the finest examples of Gothic and Renaissance architecture on the Adriatic coast. Because of its exceptional cultural, historical, and artistic significance, the Cathedral of St. James was inscribed on the UNESCO World Heritage List in 2000.

== History ==
=== Foundation ===
Šibenik was first mentioned in written records in 1066, in a document issued by the Croatian king Petar Krešimir IV, who ruled from 1058 to 1074. Unlike most major coastal cities in Croatia, Šibenik was not founded during ancient times, but emerged nearly a thousand years later.

The 13th century marked a turning point in the city’s history. During this period, Šibenik fought to rise from the status of a villa - a settlement or town, to that of a civitas, meaning a fully recognized city with political independence and freedoms already enjoyed by neighboring urban centers. An important step forward came in 1251, when King Bela IV confirmed a charter granting the town broad autonomy. However, complete recognition also required ecclesiastical independence. This was finally achieved on May 1, 1298, when Pope Boniface VIII authorized the establishment of a bishopric in Šibenik, officially granting it city status.

The following century brought rapid growth and prosperity to the independent city and its diocese. By the beginning of the 15th century, this development inspired plans for the construction of a new cathedral. The existing Church of St. James, which had served as the cathedral until then, had become too small and unsuitable for the needs of the growing community. At the initiative of Bishop Bogdan Pulšić, a council of local citizens decided on April 10, 1402, to build a new cathedral that would be “wider, taller, and grander.”

=== Construction ===
The construction of the cathedral marked the symbolic culmination of Šibenik’s centuries-long ambition to separate from the Diocese of Trogir and achieve greater civic and religious independence through its own cathedral church. It was built on the southern side of the city’s main medieval square, on the site of the former Romanesque Church of St. James. During the first decade, Venetian Gothic architects collaborated with local stonemasons Andrija Budčić and Budiša Statčić. In that period, the northern and southern walls, the lower Gothic section of the façade, and both church portals were completed.

Shortly after the city authorities secured funding and started preparing building materials, conflict broke out with Venice. As a result, part of the stone intended for the cathedral was instead used to strengthen the city’s fortifications. The conflict lasted from 1409 to 1412, but stability did not fully return for another decade. Only in 1424 did preparations for the cathedral resume and stone production begin again. Finally, in May 1430, Bishop Bogdan Pulšić and two members of the Tavelić noble family signed a one-year agreement with the Venetian master builder Francesco di Giacomo, also known as Fran Jakovljev, to oversee and direct the construction of the new cathedral. It is believed that during that year Francesco’s task was to prepare the architectural design and detailed construction plans, allowing local builders and stonemasons to continue and complete the project after his departure. The foundation stone of the new cathedral was laid on April 9, 1431.

=== First phase of construction (1431 - 1441) ===
The first phase of construction lasted from 1431 to 1441. During this period, several master builders worked on the cathedral according to the original plans created by Francesco di Giacomo. Among the craftsmen involved were the Venetian masters Lorenzo Piucino and Antonio di Pier Paolo Busato, as well as the Šibenik stonemasons Andrija Budčić and Grubiša Slafčić. Stone used for the construction was transported from the islands of Korčula, Susak, Brač, Rab, and Krk.

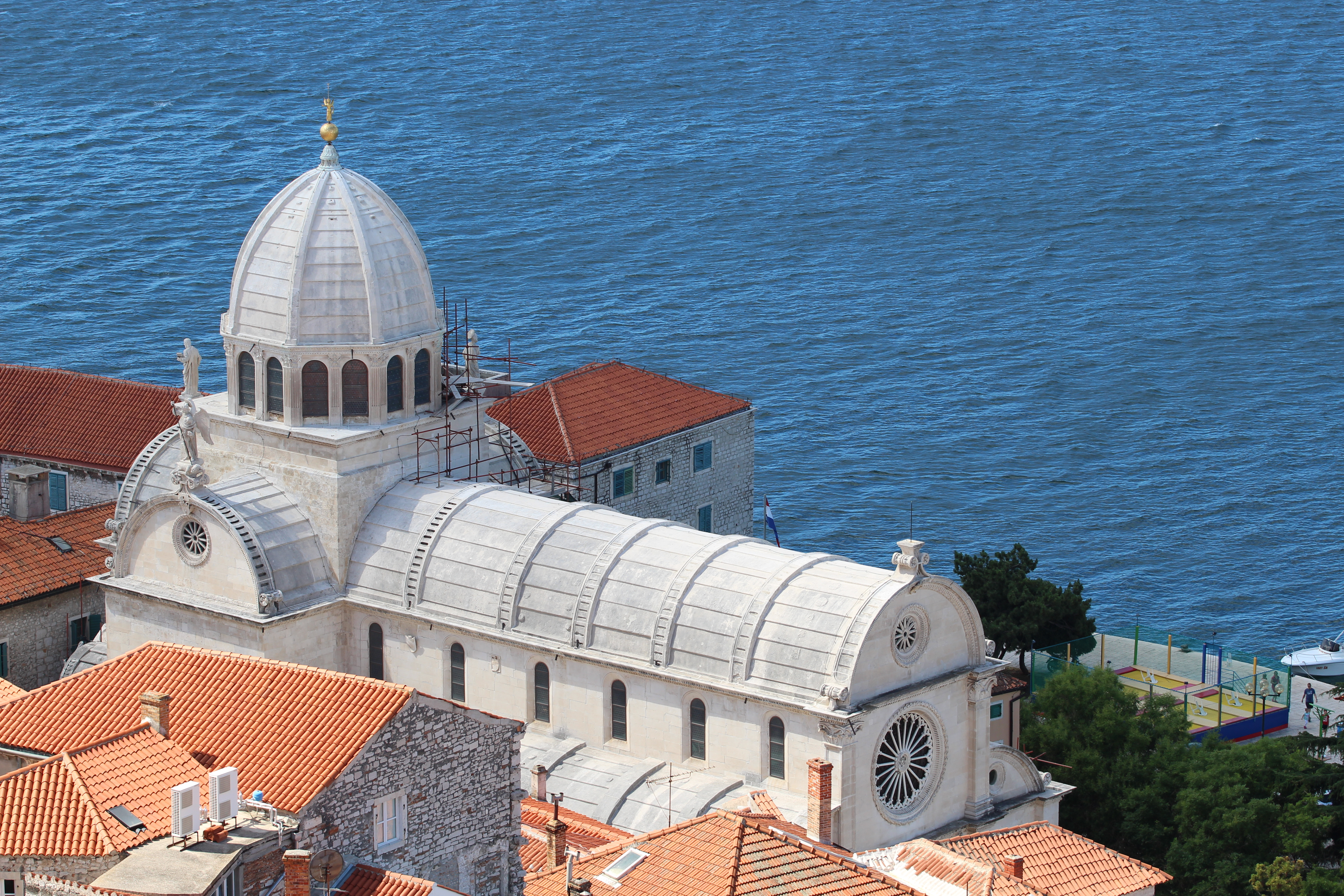
The present appearance of the Šibenik Cathedral is largely the result of Juraj Dalmatinac’s vision. Through his redesigned plans, he introduced a series of innovative architectural solutions that made the cathedral unique among European cathedrals and Christian churches of its time.

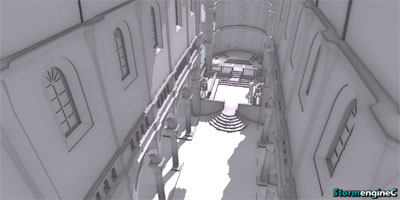
3D rendering of the cathedral

On April 23, 1441, the Šibenik noble council concluded that large sums of money had already been spent, yet serious construction mistakes had been made, some of which required parts of the structure to be demolished and rebuilt. A special committee was formed to resolve these issues. A delegation was immediately sent to Venice to request permission to remove offices and stables located in front of the rector’s palace and to create a new street in their place. Permission was granted, but even more important was the fact that the delegation returned with a new architect. Following the discovery of flaws in the earlier construction work, the cathedral supervisors signed a contract with a new chief architect and master builder - Juraj Dalmatinac, the greatest contribution to the history of the cathedral. In the presence of Duke Jakov Donat, the city council, municipal official Nikolini, and two witnesses, an agreement was concluded with “the prudent man, Master Juraj, stonemason, son of the late Matej from Zadar, resident of Venice, presently in Šibenik.” Juraj committed himself, as chief master of the Cathedral of St. James, to direct and supervise all construction works, provide instructions, measurements, and technical guidance, while also personally working as both builder and stonemason. His first contract in 1441 was concluded for a period of 6 years to build just a simple church, but another contract of 10 years followed the first one in 1446. His responsibilities additionally included traveling to quarries, organizing the extraction and shaping of stone, and supervising its transport and delivery.

=== Second phase with Juraj Dalmatinac (1441 - 1473) ===
Giorgio da Sebenico (lit. 'George of Sebenico') or Juraj Dalmatinac led the construction of the cathedral from 1441 until his death in 1473. Juraj Dalmatinac, who expanded the project and continued to build according to the characteristics of the Renaissance. The cathedral was built only of stone without any binding material. Throughout those decades, he worked alongside numerous highly skilled assistants, collaborators, and apprentices, among whom the most notable were Andrija Aleši and Ivan Pribislavić. Many of them later collaborated with him on other important architectural projects as well. Juraj Dalmatinac expanded the original design by adding a dome and, enlarged the cathedral with a side nave and apses, so that the ground plan of the cathedral was in the shape of a cross, built the presbytery, sanctuary and his masterpiece - the baptistery. using an innovative assembly technique with large stone slabs, constructed the lower sections of the sanctuary, baptistery, and sacristy. In doing so, he introduced the principle of unified stone construction, which was later continued by his successors. At the same time, the previously begun longitudinal walls of the church were being completed up to the height of the cornice of the suspended arches, while inside, according to Master Juraj’s new design, the arcades of the central nave were being raised together with the vaulted side chapels up to the same level.

When construction was interrupted in 1455, the high substructures of the polygonal sanctuary had been built up to the level of the cornice with sculpted heads, that is, up to the level of the presbytery floor in the interior. He further enriched his life’s masterpiece with remarkable sculptural works in the baptistery and along the apse frieze, bringing some of the earliest influences of Renaissance art into Dalmatia.

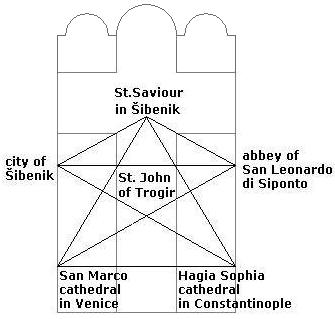
Artistic trinities of the Cathedral

The investors considered that too little for the money spent, so Juraj Dalmatinac altered the plan: With tremendous skill, he combined architectural and decorative elements to create a unified entity. Juraj Dalmatinac combined several artistic elements in the ground plan: the Lion Gate was inspired by the Abbey of San Leonardo di Siponto (Puglia), the central nave by Trogir Cathedral, an eagle over the main entrance as the John the Evangelist's symbol, the St Mark's Basilica as one side nave and the Hagia Sophia in Constantinople as the other side nave. He constructed the western main portal, the northern portal (The Lion Gate) and the first chapel. The western main portal was decorated by Bonino da Milano, first master mason, with statues of Christ and the twelve apostles. The current bronze door was created in 1967 by the Šibenik sculptor Grga Antunac.

The motif of the northern portal, called the Lion Gate, are Adam and Eve standing on two lions, which is also seen at the Trogir Cathedral, but here Adam and Eve are on columns over the lions. These statues, together with St. Jacob and St. Peter, are the work of Juraj Dalmatinac. The statue of Eve draws the attention of onlookers as she has a belly button, while, according to the Bible, she was conceived from a rib of Adam. The bronze doors were made in 1967 by the Šibenik sculptor Grga Antunac. The coats of arms of two bishops and of the procurator of then-church of St. Saviour in Šibenik were placed over the Lion Gate.

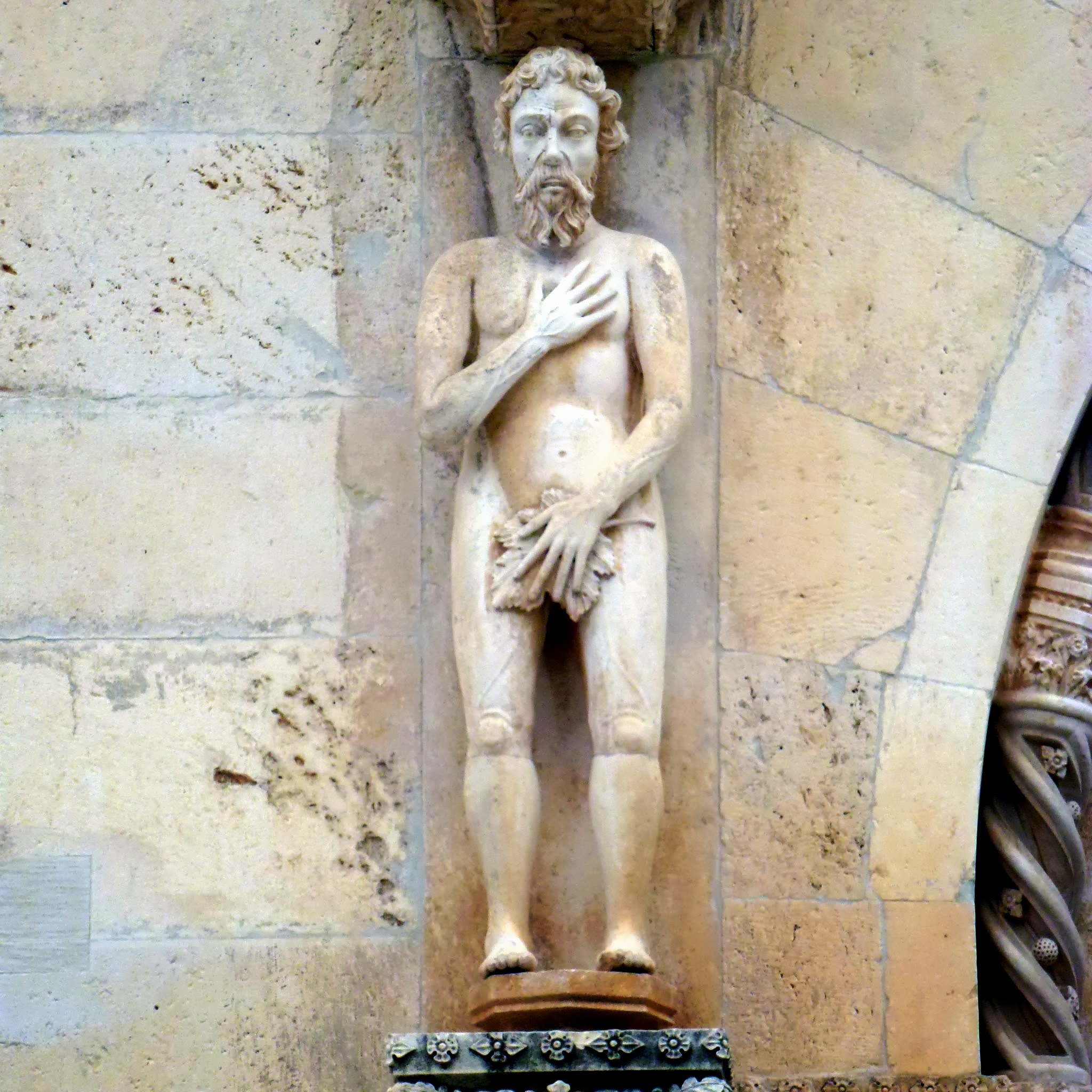
Statue of Adam above Lion Gate

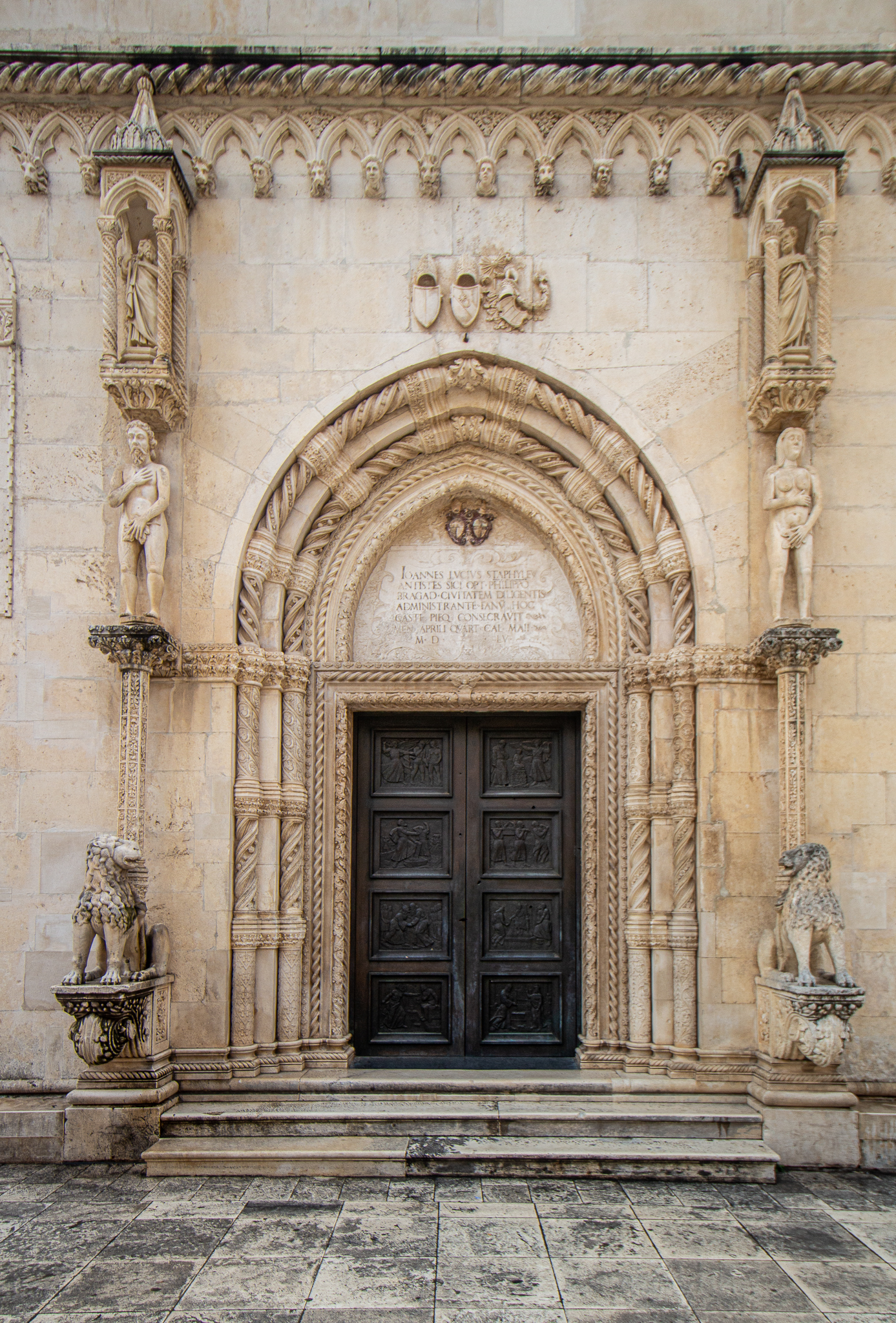
The Lion Gate

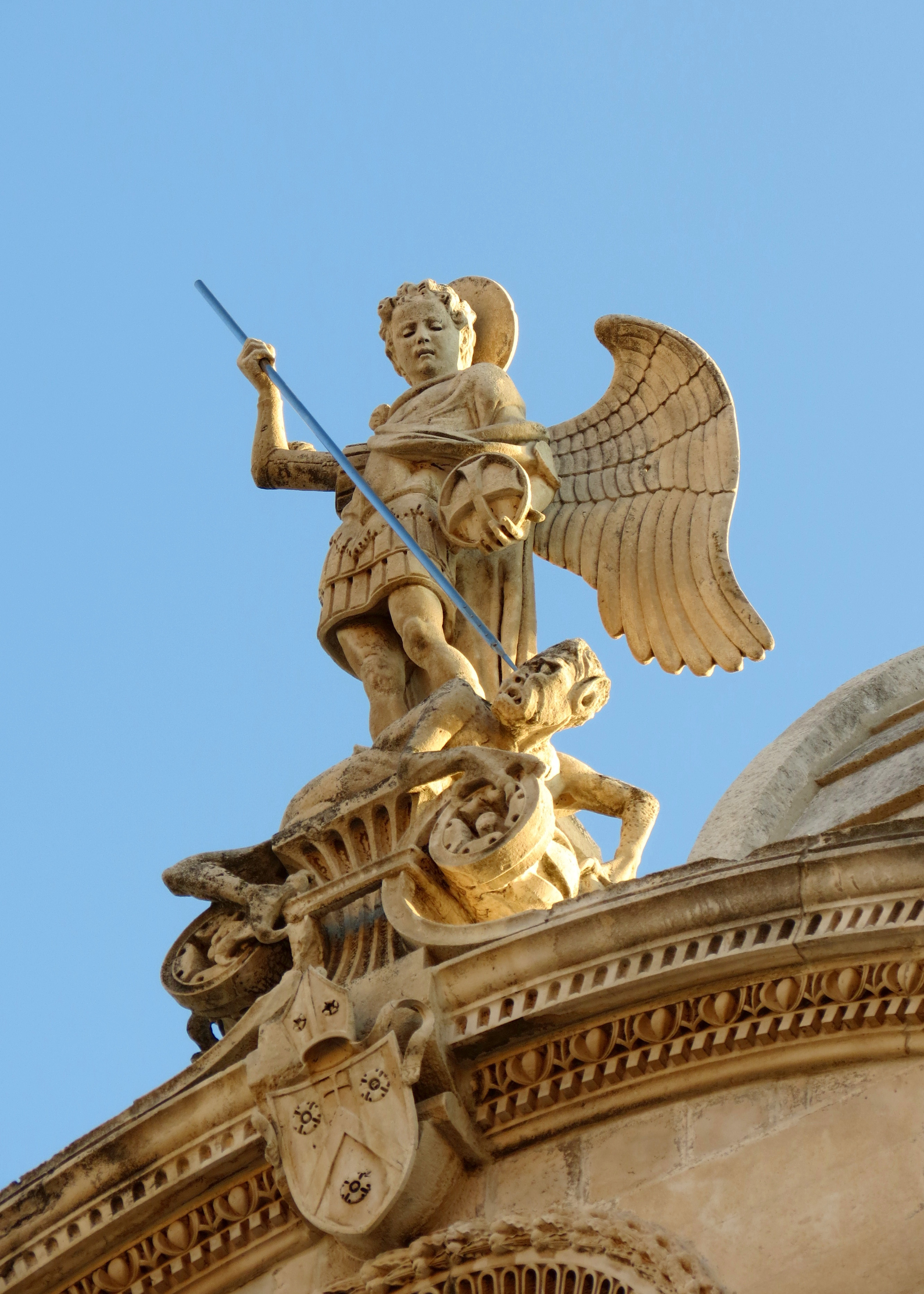
St.Michael, sculpture by Niccolò di Giovanni Fiorentino on the dome

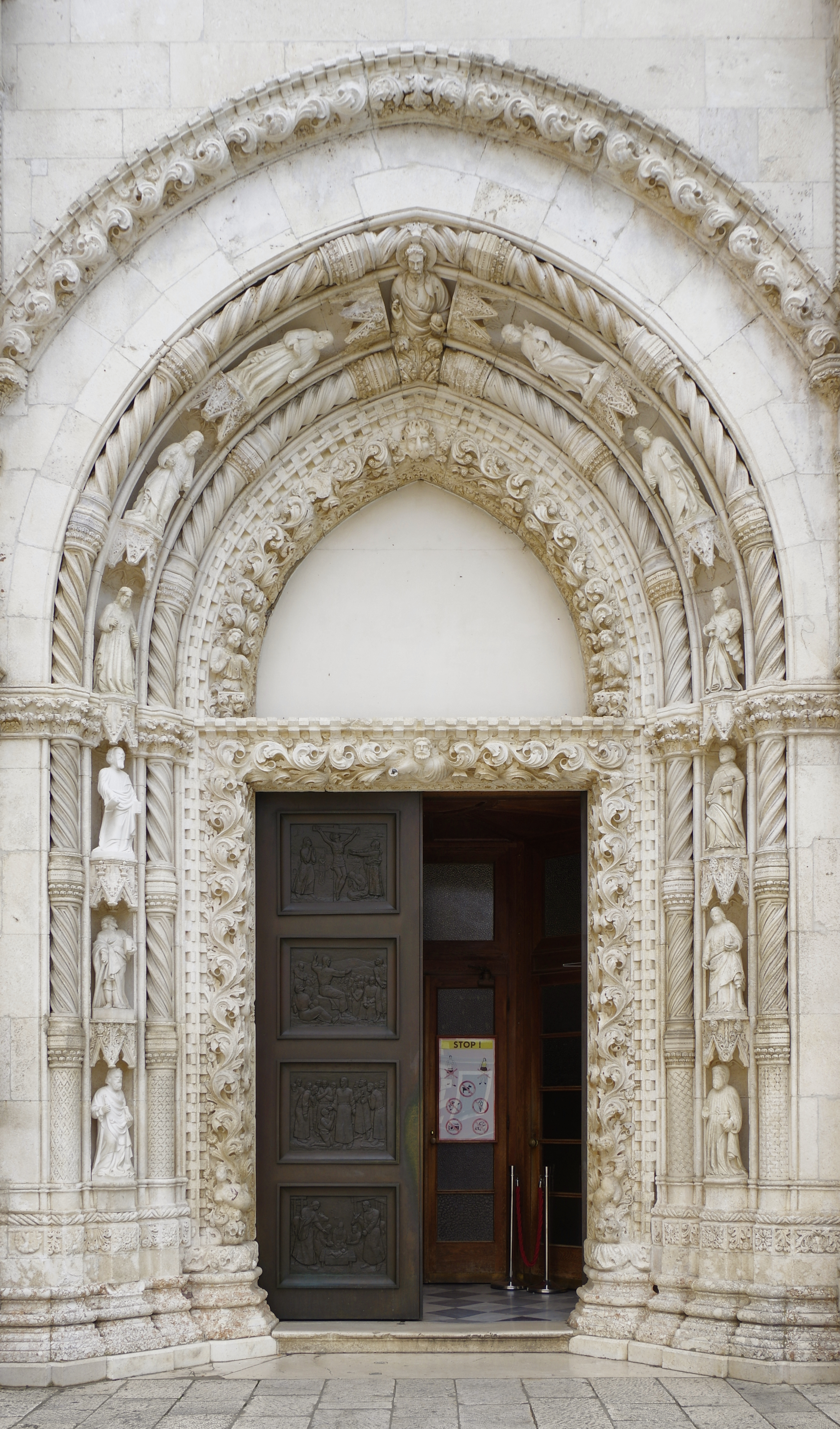
Portal by Bonino da Milano who decorated the portal with Jesus and Twelve apostles

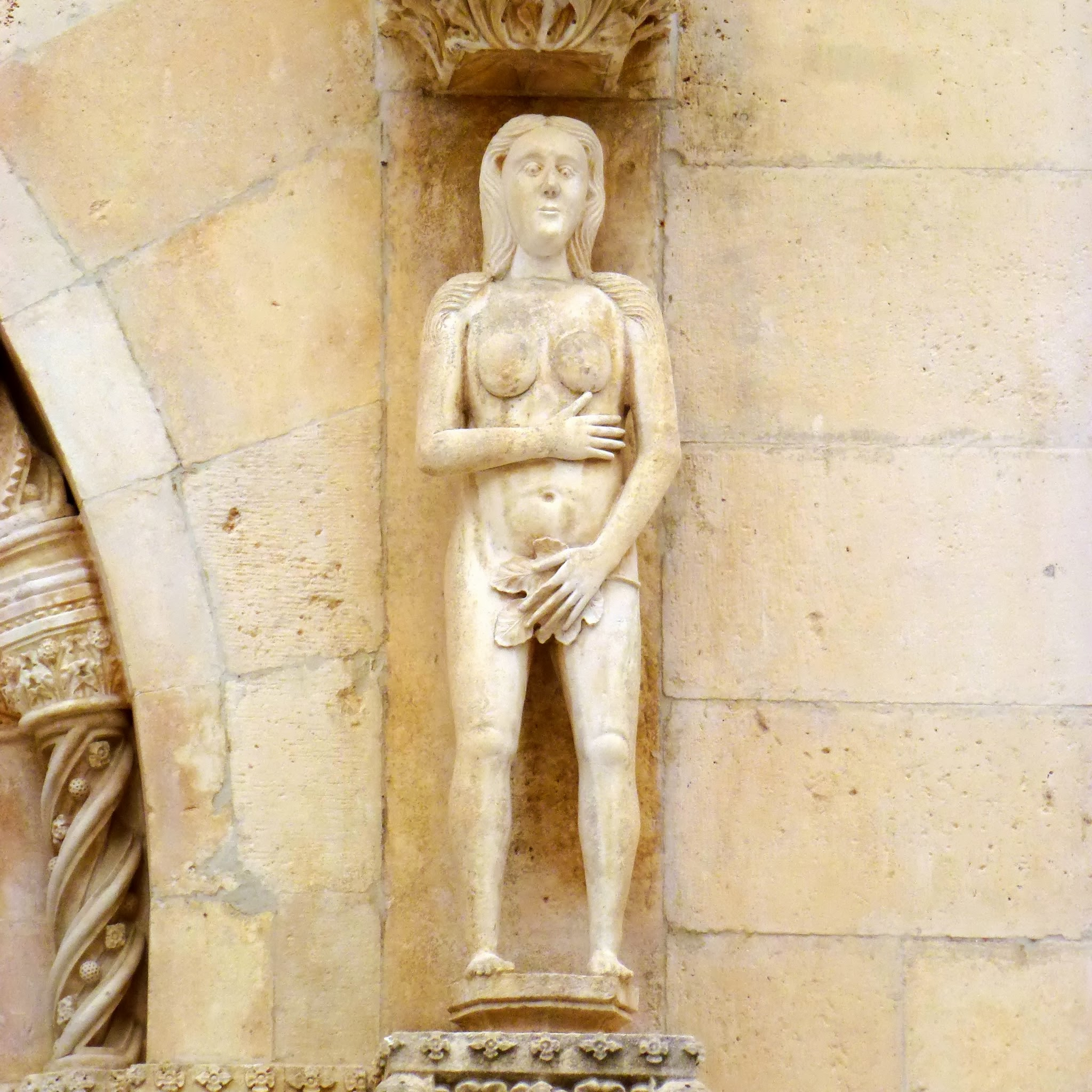
Statue of Eve above Lion Gate

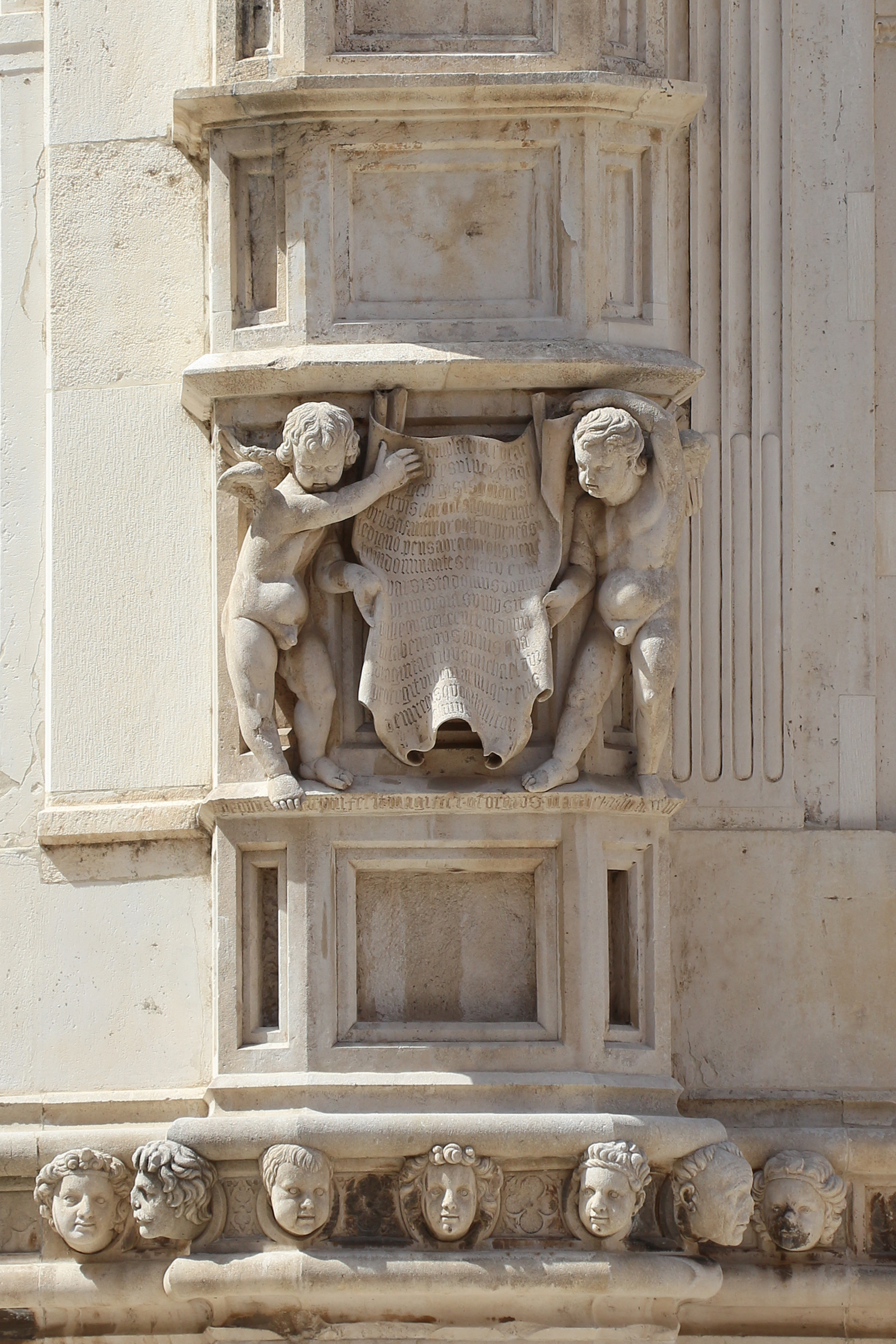
Two Renaissance putti

The two Renaissance putti at the northern end of the cathedral bear an inscription of the consecration in 1443 of the cathedral. Under their feet is his only remaining signature: "Hoc opus cuvarum fecit magister Georgius Matthei Dalmaticus". He also designed the baptistery in the 1440s. He built it next to the southern apse in the form of a quatrefoil. The upper part is covered with lacelike sculptures, the first Renaissance sculptural work in Croatia. The flat niches are vaulted with corrugated seashells of St. James. On the baldachins between them hold two statues: King David and the prophet Simon. The vault ribs end in the keystone representing the Father God, surrounded by angels and the dove (symbol of the Holy Ghost). The baptismal font, made from reddish breccias, is supported by three angels.

The apses are decorated on the outside with various sculptural decorations, including 74 small Renaissance portraits immortalising important contemporaries and figures who had for some reason particularly impressed the architect or that he deemed to tight to help foot the bill for the cathedral's construction. Some of these heads on the facade have a damaged nose, probably due to vandalism. Indeed, until Justinian II this was the expression to discredit the reputation of someone, and so it was necessary that this individual remained anonymous.

Juraj Dalmatinac worked probably on the cathedral up to his death in 1475 and certainly until 1473.

=== Third phase with Niccolò di Giovanni Fiorentino (1475 - 1505) ===
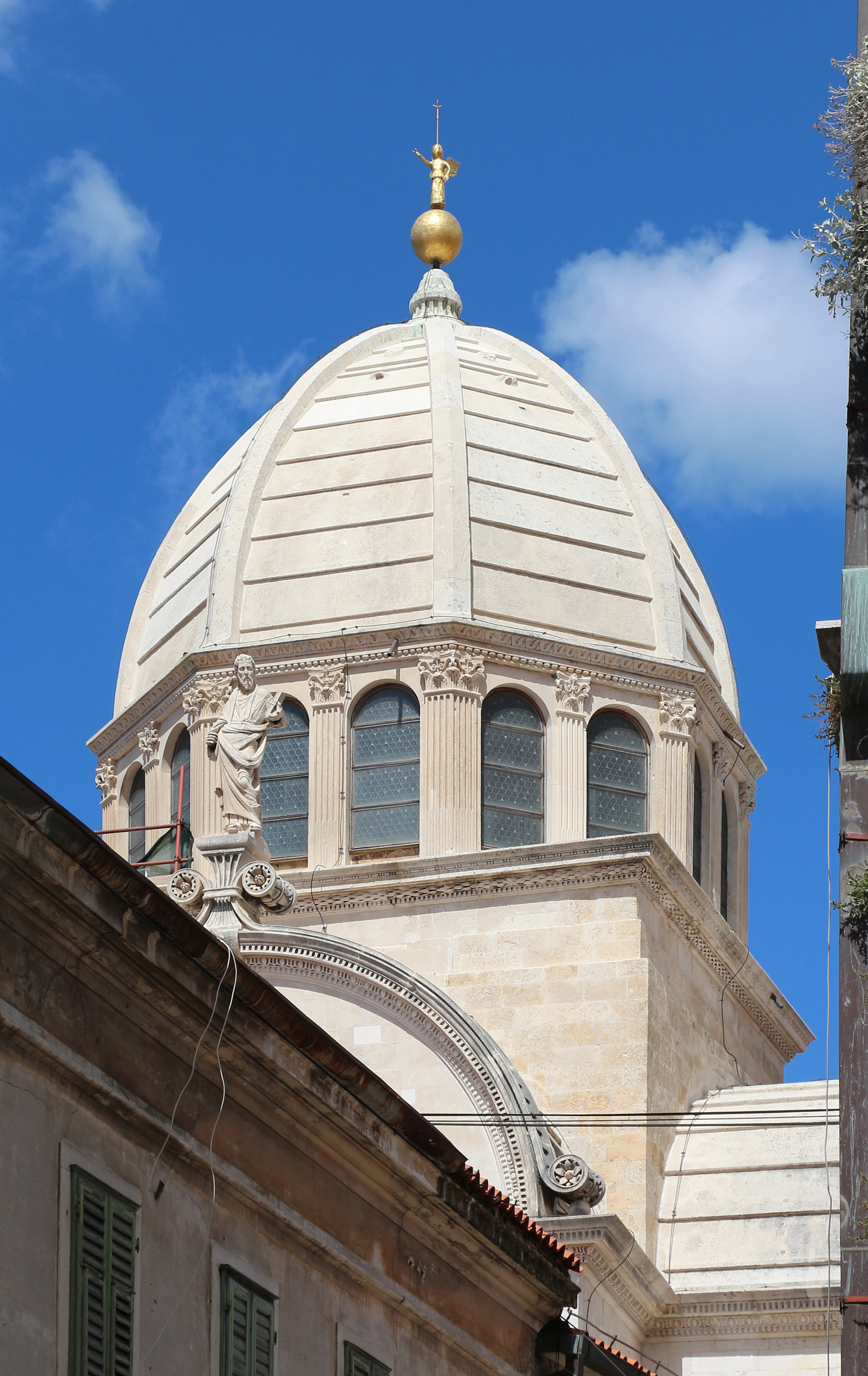
St. James statue on the dome of the cathedral with visible roof lantern

Between 1475 and 1505 the work was overseen by Tuscan master Niccolò di Giovanni Fiorentino (Nicola Firentinac), from the Donatello school of sculpture who developed as a sculptor and builder in Dalmatia. When Firentinac arrived, he found the cathedral completed up to the height of the enclosing walls of the sanctuary and the side aisles, but the parts were mutually uncoordinated and structurally disconnected, with numerous irregularities in the ground plan of the entire choir area (including thinned and broken wall sections of the sanctuary and transept in the interior). By 1477, Nikola Firentinac had produced a design for the completion of the entire upper structure of the cathedral and began vaulting the side chapels of the sanctuary. By transforming the earlier concept of a three-aisled basilica with an open roof into a church covered with barrel vaults, he first levelled the heights of the sanctuary and the three-aisled nave, and then, using a strong all’antica cornice, clearly separated the earlier construction from his new upper design.

Adapting Juraj’s “modular” construction technique, Firentinac raised short barrel vaults over the sanctuary’s side chapels, made of long stone slabs laid in overlapping courses (completed by 1479). In order to prepare a stable and regular structural base for the similarly conceived large vaults of the church, he corrected and reinforced the walls of the choir, quickly raising them (by 1483) to the level of the vault springing. In doing so, he applied complex engineering solutions, including hidden metal ties embedded within the thickness of the walls and cantilevered flat arches (piattabanda). The barrel vaults, together with the crossing crowned by an octagonal drum Roof lantern and dome, were completed by 1499. That year, Nikola ceased to serve as protomagister and, independently, signed a contract for the creation of stone furnishings in the sanctuary. Aside from the dome, by the time of his death (1506/1507) two additional bays of the barrel vault over the nave had been constructed, along with corresponding quarter-barrel vaults over the side aisles.

He continued the building in the Tuscan Renaissance style, completing the extensive galleries, building the vault in the central nave, the outer sculptures of St. Michael, St. James and St. Mark. The barrel roof is made from a line of enormous stone slabs and considered a marvel of construction at the time, and the upper façade. He also built the triforias (parallel galleries) and worked on the presbytery and sanctuary.

Although the dome of Šibenik Cathedral was built after the dome in Florence, Niccolò di Giovanni Fiorentino used an octagonal drum in its construction, before Bramante and Michelangelo, in its original function as the transition from the square base to the circular dome. The execution of the cupola is considered one of the best achievements of Renaissance architecture. After Nikola Firentinac, the role of protomagister was held by two more architects Bartolomeo of Mestre (from 1520), and later his son Jakov. They completed the remaining four bays of the vaults in the central and side aisles, and constructed the upper triple-lobed termination of the western façade.

== Inside the cathedral ==
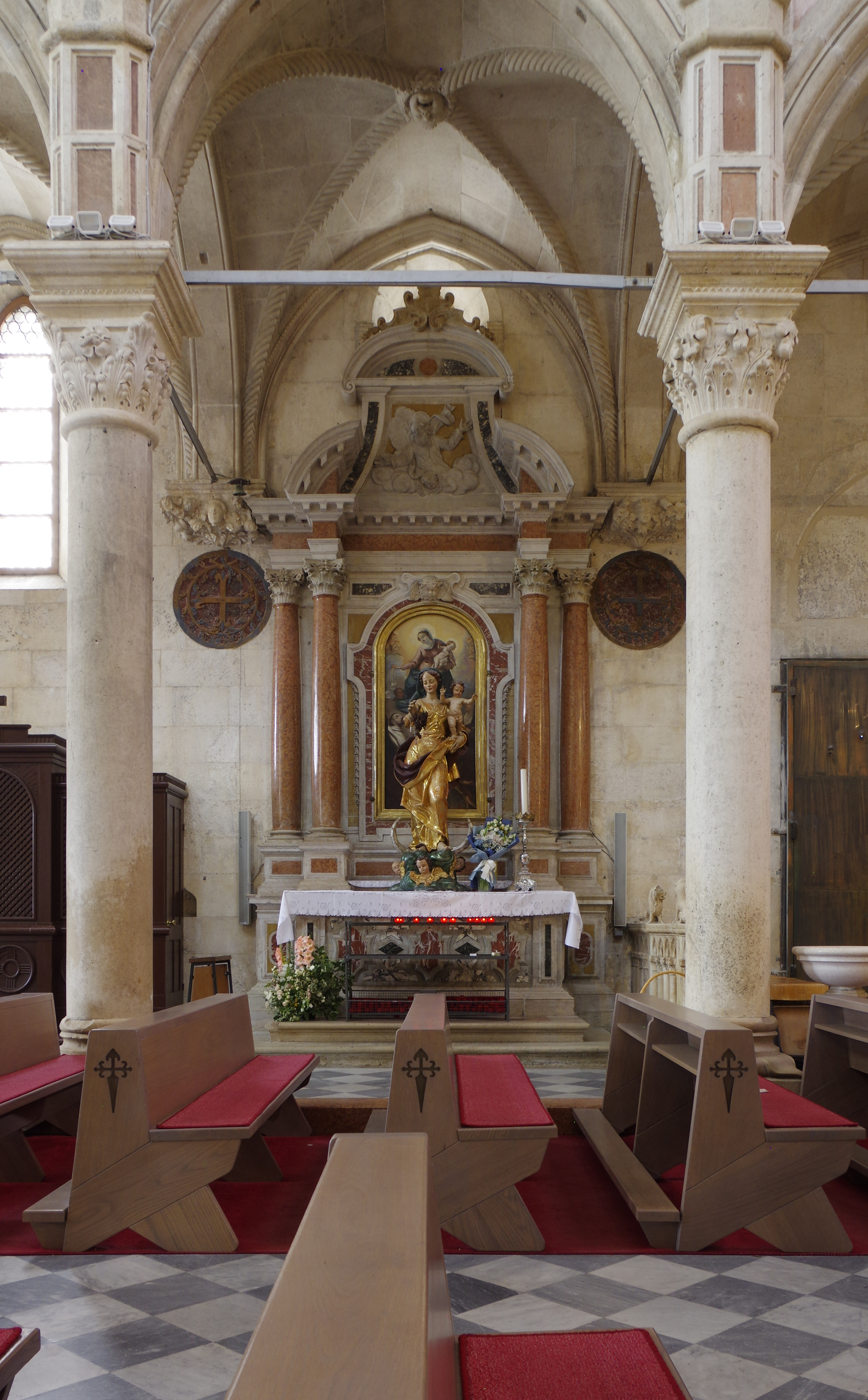
Altar

Inside the cathedral there are four large, evenly matched columns on which the dome rests. The builder decorated the capitals and came to arrangements with the nobles who were to finance the building of chapels, on condition that they would be free to choose their own builders. In the first chapel on the right-side, there is the sarcophagus of the bishop, humanist and writer Juraj Šižgorić (1420–1509) which is the work of Andrija Aleši based on a design by Juraj Dalmatinac. Aleši also created the statue of St. Elijah which stands behind the bishop's throne. On the left-hand side is the sarcophagus of Bishop Ivan Štafilić, during whose life the cathedral was completed. Beneath the choir there are the graves of two bishops, with reliefs: on the right Bishop Calegari and on the left, Bishop Spingarola. The latter is the work of the local artist Antun Nogulović.

Opposite the famous Altar of the Holy Cross (Sveti Križ) made by Juraj Ćulinović (Giorgio Schiavone) is buried (1433 or 1446–1505). On the altar there is a painting by Felipe Zaniberti. Amongst other altars to the left of the entrance is the Altar of the Holy Three Kings with a painting by Bernardo Rizzardi, according to the ground plan of Juraj Dalmatinac. The fragments of the mosaic of the Holy Three Kings in St. Mark's Basilica, Venice are now in the Museo Marciano in Venice. The sides of the altar are decorated with reliefs of two angels holding the scroll of Nikola Firentinac, set into shell-shaped niches. The cathedral treasury includes works by the Renaissance master Orazio Fortezza of Šibenik (1530–1596), an exceptional goldsmith and miniaturist. After Fiorentino died in 1505, the construction was finally completed in 1535 by two other craftsmen, Bartolomeo of Mestra and his son Jacob, completely following Nicholas' instructions. The cathedral officially became consecrated in 1555 after a multitude of Venetian and local craftsmen had worked on it, in Gothic style.

== Characteristics ==
The Cathedral of Šibenik is a three-aisled cathedral measuring 38 × 14 metres, with a maximum height of 38 metres at the top of the dome. It was built entirely of stone, whereas most other stone churches were traditionally constructed using mortar, most often with wooden roof structures covered with tiles, and sometimes with lead sheets. For the cathedral, Juraj used limestone from the island of Brač as well as stones from other Croatian islands, quarried in the northern part of the island in the Veselje area, where stone had been extracted since antiquity. Because of its quality and beauty, this stone is often referred to as “Brač marble”.

Furthermore, the Šibenik Cathedral is the only building in Europe before the 19th century (when metal structures and reinforced concrete began to be used) whose apse walls were not made of mortar-bound elements, but were assembled using an original technique of fitting large stone slabs precisely cut to measure. These elements were carefully profiled according to design drawings and joined so that a stepped cut on one slab fits over the adjacent one “in overlap,” or so that a projecting edge of one slab fits into a groove in the next, “tongue and groove,” a method typically used in carpentry. In addition to the slabs, large stone piers and ribs or transverse arches were also used, integrated in the same way into a statically perfectly structured tectonic system.

=== Heads around the apse ===
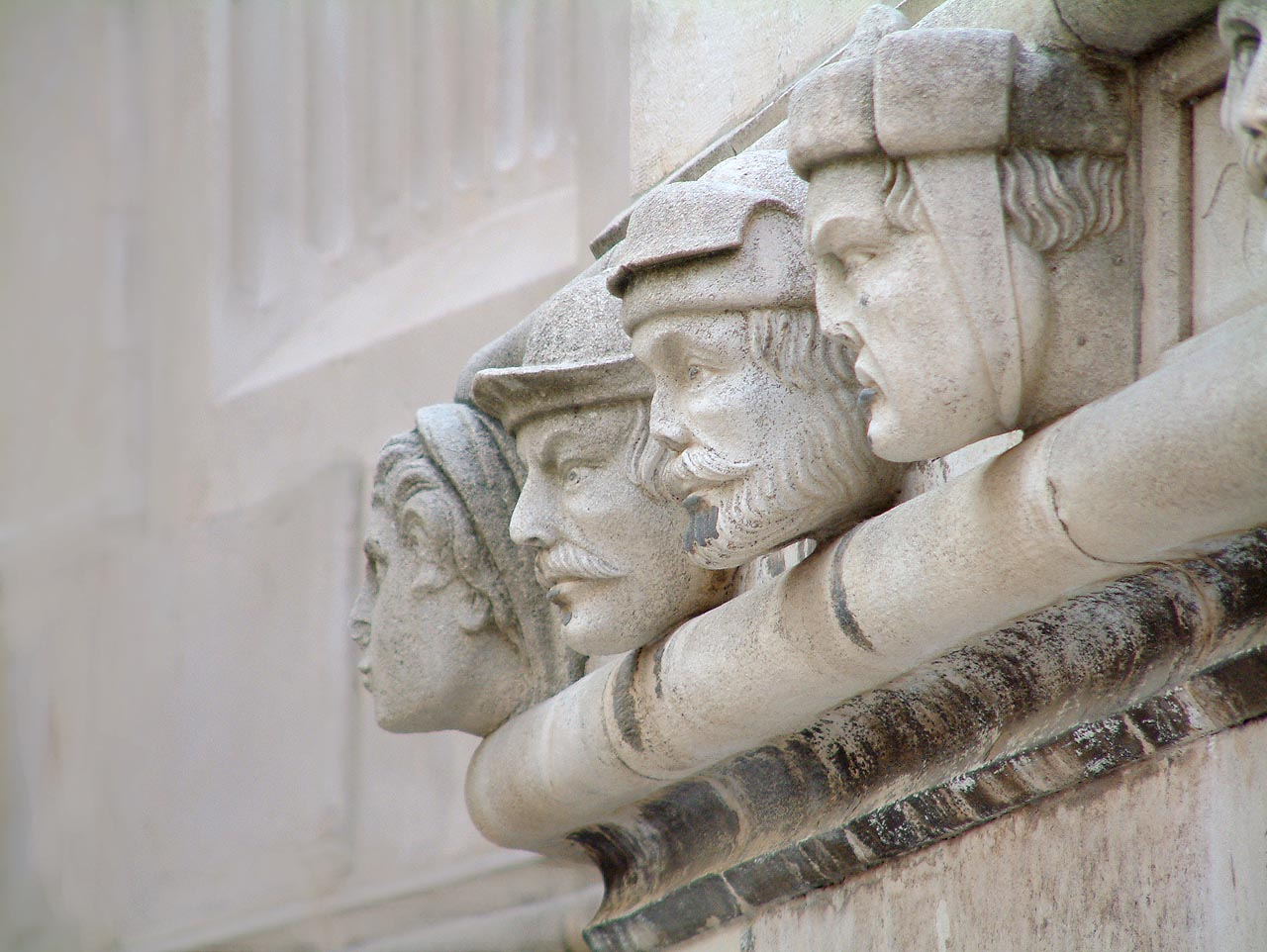
72 Human heads around the apses

The Cathedral of Šibenik is also significant for a series of innovations in iconography, most notably the famous sequence of seventy-four sculpted heads placed along the cornice of the three apses. Viewing humanity through the lens of the new humanist philosophy, Juraj Dalmatinac placed man above traditional ecclesiastical iconography, giving primacy to the individual rather than purely religious symbolism. This sequence of heads constitutes the largest and highest-quality portrait gallery displayed as a public monument of secular sculpture on a sacred building in Europe, representing a kind of triumph of early Renaissance humanism. Interestingly, the heads bear no insignia of rank, names, or professions, leaving it unknown whether they depict donors, nobles, martyrs, saints, or ordinary passers-by, but it's believed that the heads represent different people from Dalmatia at the time. In their physiognomies, the sculptor’s exceptional portrait skills conveyed individual character traits and psychological nuances, further emphasizing the humanist focus on the individual within the sacred architectural setting.

=== Baptistery ===
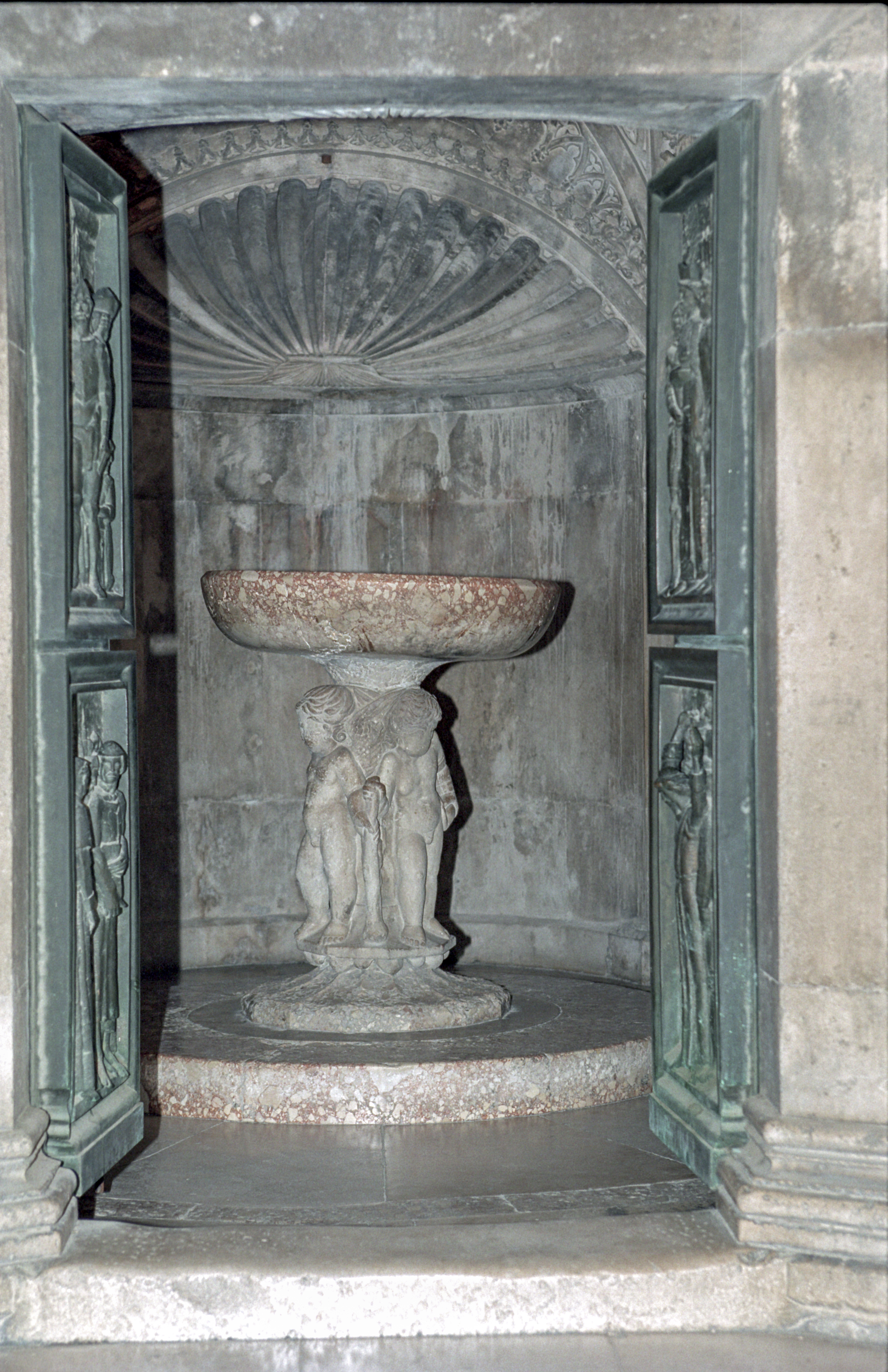
Baptistery, a masterpiece of Juraj Dalmatinac

On the southern side of the sanctuary and the apse below is the Gothic-Renaissance baptistery (1443), a masterpiece by Juraj Dalmatinac. A particular highlight is the cathedral’s baptistery, which Juraj Dalmatinac placed on the ground floor of the southern apse. It is a small, circular space with recesses that connect into supporting columns. On their foliate capitals, the artist placed statues of prophets beneath baldachins, and covered the space with a gently curved vault divided by bands into four sections.

The baptistery’s most striking feature is the richness of its sculptural decoration, in which the human figure plays a dominant role. Alongside four statues of prophets (two of which have been preserved), the vault is filled with full-length figures of angels, cherubic heads, and a prominent relief of God the Father. At the centre, a trio of chubby, dynamically modelled nude children was placed around the baptismal font, where three winged boys (putti) support it. Here, Juraj Dalmatinac unified Gothic ornamentation with Renaissance figural sculpture into a coherent and harmonious whole. The vault itself was constructed using his modular building technique, consisting of only nine precisely cut stone blocks interlocked without mortar or any binding material. Together with the ribbed ornamentation, these elements form the Gothic component of the baptistery’s decorative scheme.

=== Treasury ===
Inside the cathedral there are also several tombs of Šibenik’s bishops. To the right of the main entrance lies the sarcophagus of Juraj Šižgorić, with a stone lid bearing a sculpted image of the bishop, the work of Juraj Dalmatinac. On the left side is the sarcophagus of Bishop Ivan Stafilić, while to the right of the semicircular staircase leading up to the choir is the tomb of the Venetian Callegari, bishop of Šibenik (1676–1722). On the left side is the tomb of Bishop Spingarola (1573–1589), with a relief of the reclining prelate made by the Šibenik sculptor Antun Nugulović.

== Subsequent work ==
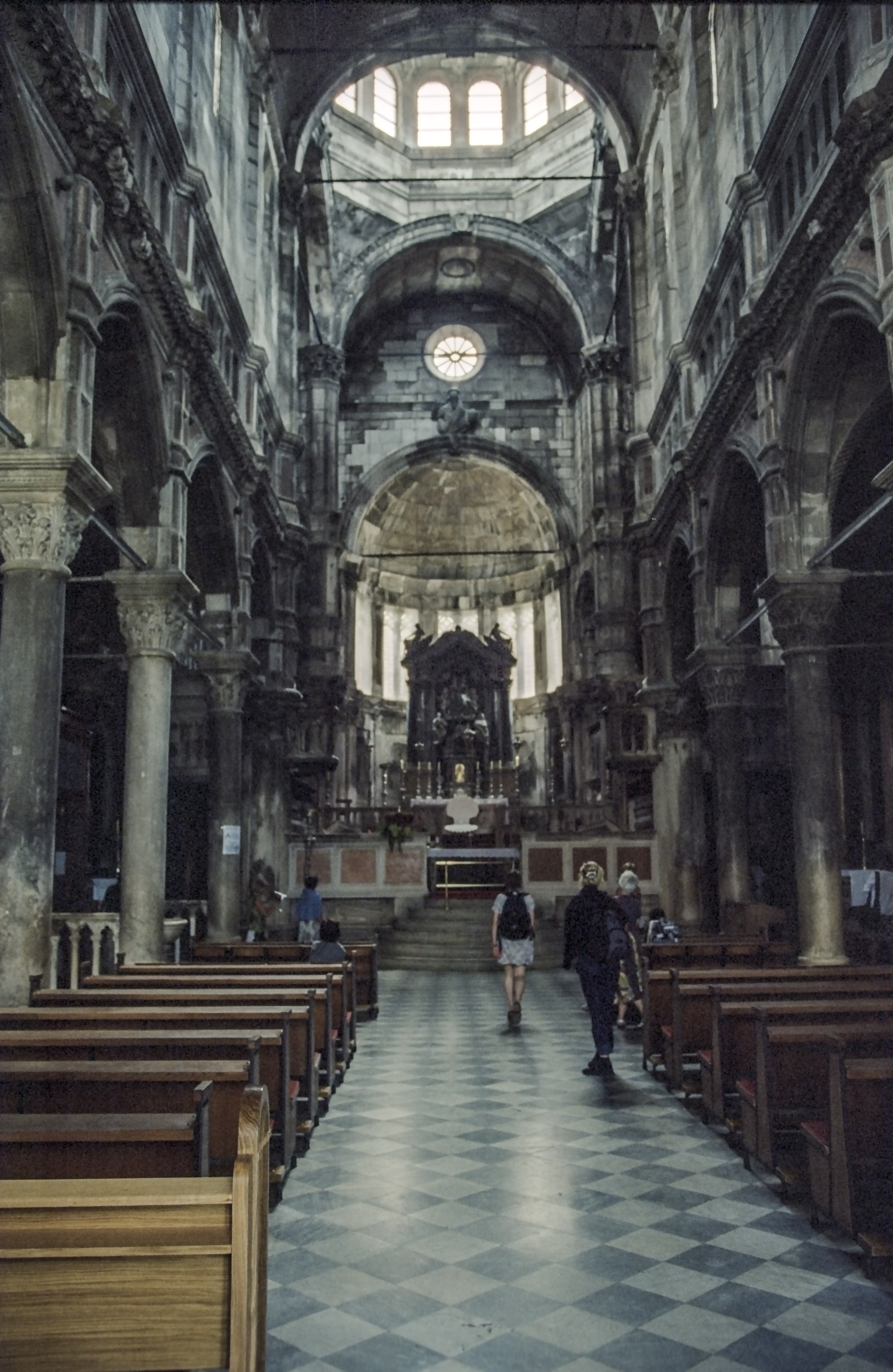
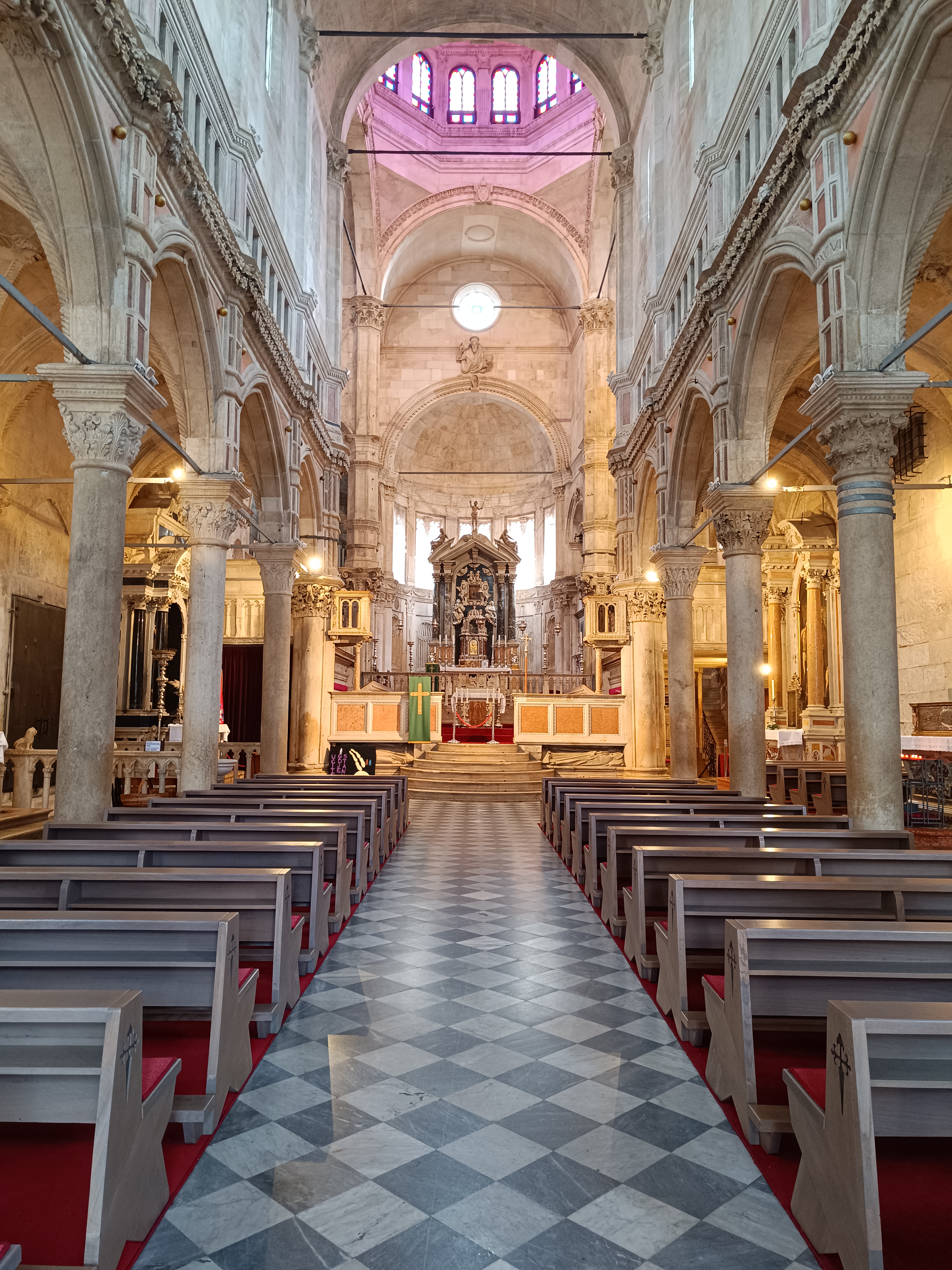
Main nave of St. James Cathedral before and after 2013-2015 restoration, with visible restoration to nave and aisles

Since the 16th century, numerous minor repairs have been continuously carried out on the cathedral, primarily due to water leakage problems. In the second half of the 19th century, through the efforts of the Šibenik architect Paolo Bioni and with the support of the Austrian government, a thorough and comprehensive restoration was undertaken between 1843 and 1860. Most of the restoration was done between 1850 and 1860 and subsequently between 1992 and 1997.

After the Second World War, the sacristy was completely restored between 1947 and 1949, and the replacement of the iron tie rods in 1961 provided structural stabilization for the cathedral. On 18 September 1991, during the shelling of Šibenik in the Croatian War of Independence, the cathedral's dome was heavily damaged when three shells fired by Yugoslav People's Army-supported Serb forces struck and pierced the structure. Restoration work on the damaged dome was carried out between 23 August 1996 and 14 March 1997, and the cathedral was subsequently restored with no visible signs of the wartime damage. A continuing program of maintenance, cleaning, and monitoring remains in place to preserve the monument.

A major conservation and restoration programme began in the early 2010s following extensive research by the Croatian Conservation Institute. Work commenced in 2013 with the restoration of the main apse, semi-dome, and sanctuary, using techniques such as laser cleaning, stone replacement, and the reconstruction of damaged reliefs. Later phases included the restoration of the sanctuary and the main altar of Our Lady of Tears. The project involved specialists in conservation, geology, chemistry, architecture, and art history, and was funded by the Croatian Ministry of Culture and the Diocese of Šibenik under the supervision of heritage authorities in Šibenik.

As Šibenik cathedral has no bell-tower, a tower on the adjoining city walls served this purpose until its demolition at the end of 19th century.

== Organ ==
The cathedral's pipe organ was built in 1968 by the organ builder Franc Jenko.

The instrument has two manuals and pedal, with the following specification:

- Manual I (C–g^{3}): Principal 8′, Bordun 8′, Diapason 8′, Octave 4′, Super Octave 2′, Sesquialtera, Mixture IV, Flauta Dolce 8′, Fugara 8′, Flute 4′, Tromba 8′.
- Manual II (C–g^{3}): Violin Principal 8′, Quint 2⅔′, Cymbal III, Harmonic Flute 8′, Aeoline 8′, Celeste 8′, Silvana 4′, Piccolo 2′, Oboe 8′.
- Pedal (C–f^{1}): Contrabass 16′, Subbass 16′, Pianobass 16′, Octave Bass 8′, Bourdon 8′, Choral Bass 4′, Posaune 16′.

The organ is equipped with the following couplers: Super I, Super II, Sub II/I, Pedal/I, II/I, Pedal/II, Super II/I, and Super Pedal/I. It also features fixed combinations (PP, P, MF, F, TT), two free combinations, a crescendo pedal, automatic piano-pedal function, and electric action.

== In popular culture ==
- Since the interior of the cathedral was extensively 3D recorded for documentation and restoration purposes, its 3D model is often used for graphic and especially video modelling purposes.
- The cathedral served as a backdrop for the Iron Bank in the ninth episode of the fifth season of Game of Thrones. Šibenik portrayed Braavos, the city where the Iron Bank is located.

== Gallery ==
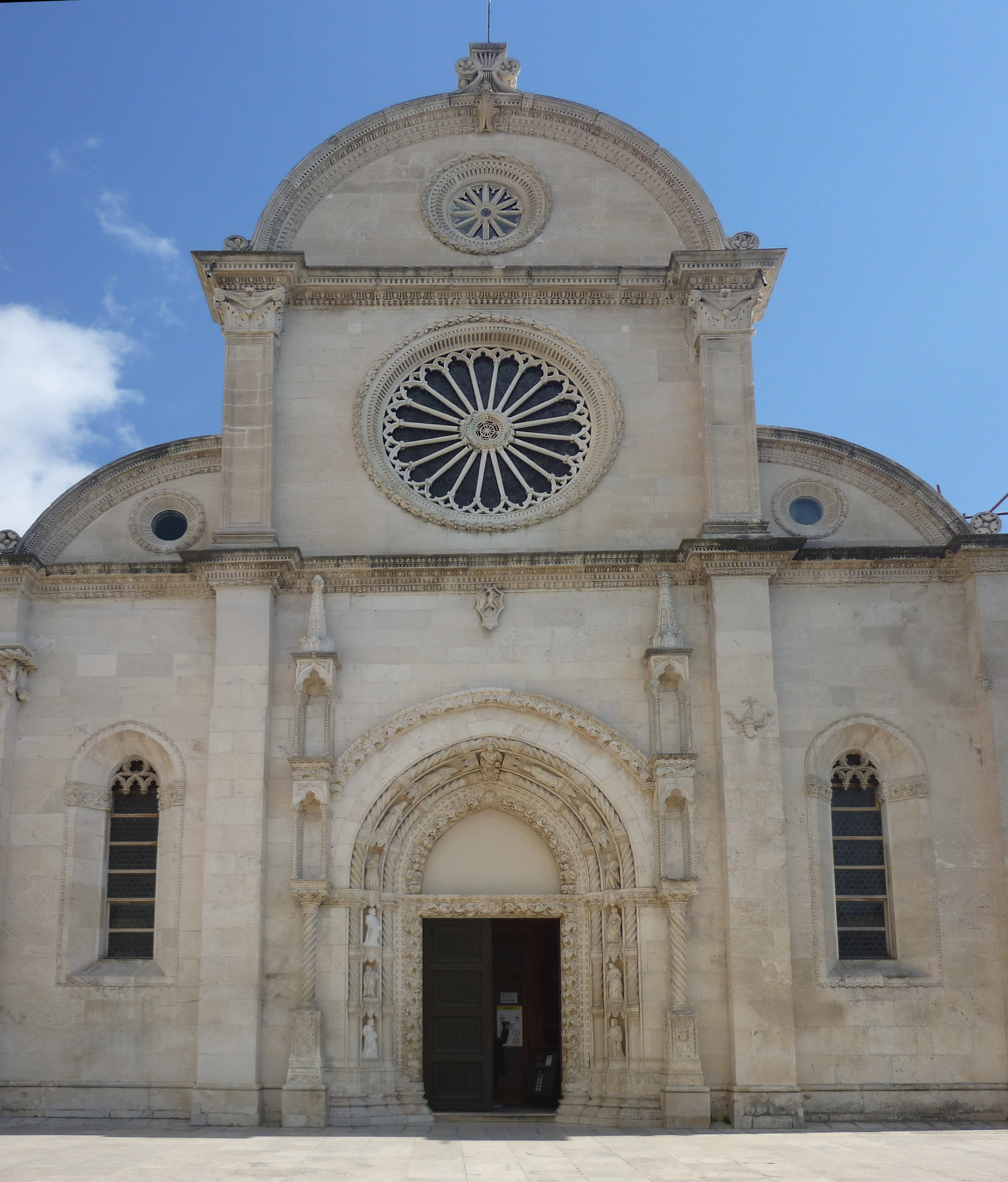
The facade of the cathedral, with the rose window and portal

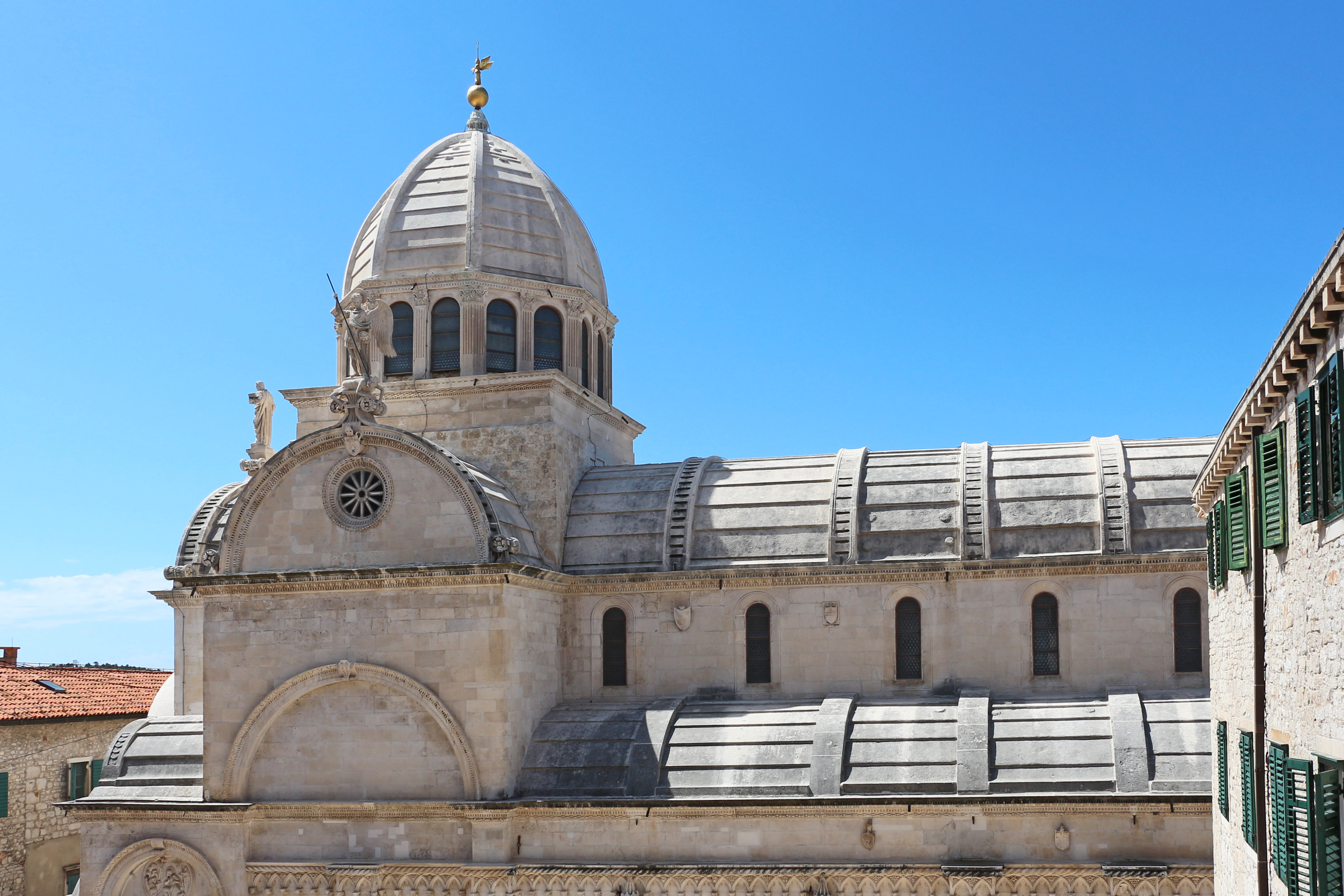
The cathedral dome and sculptures

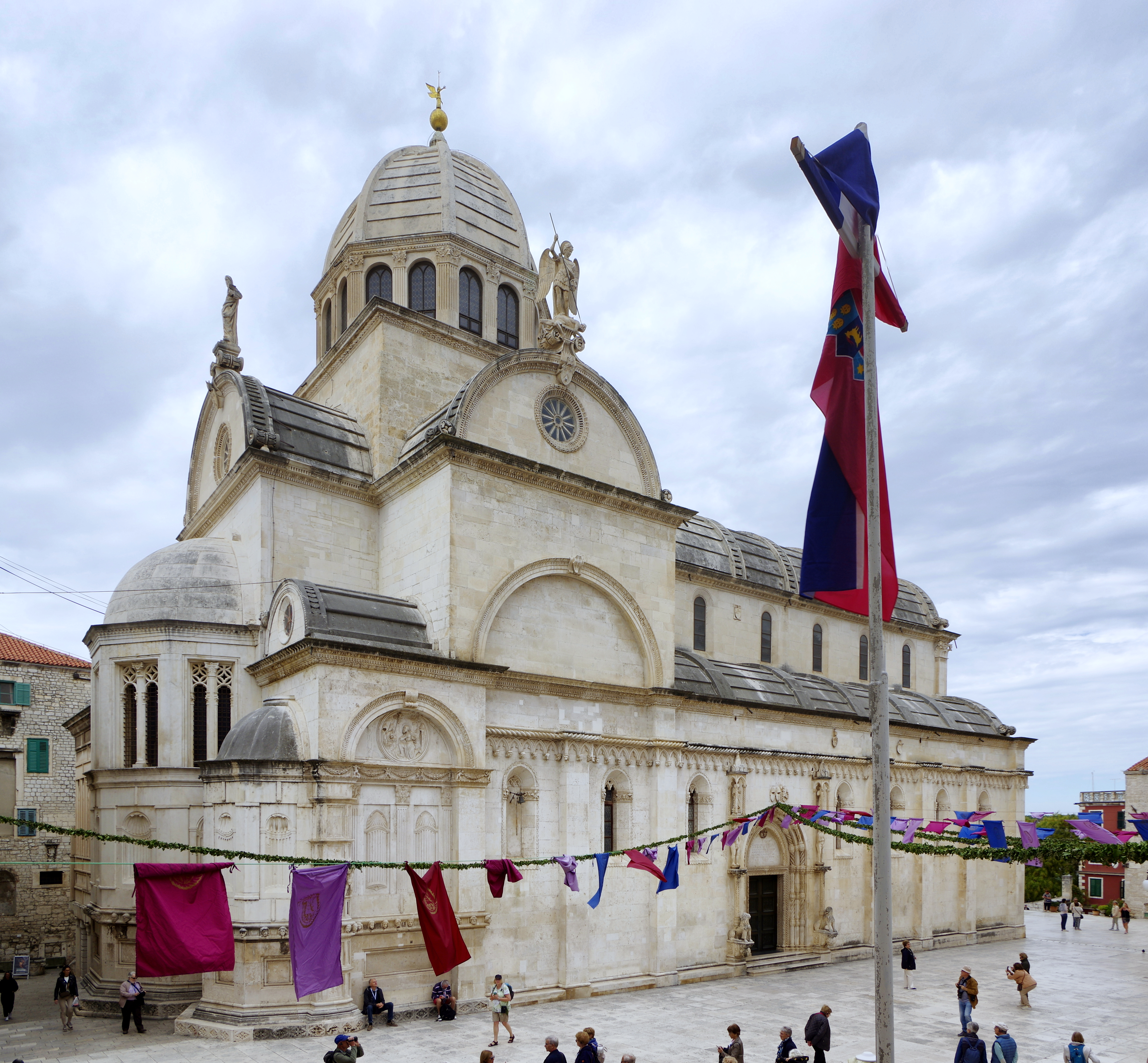
Side view

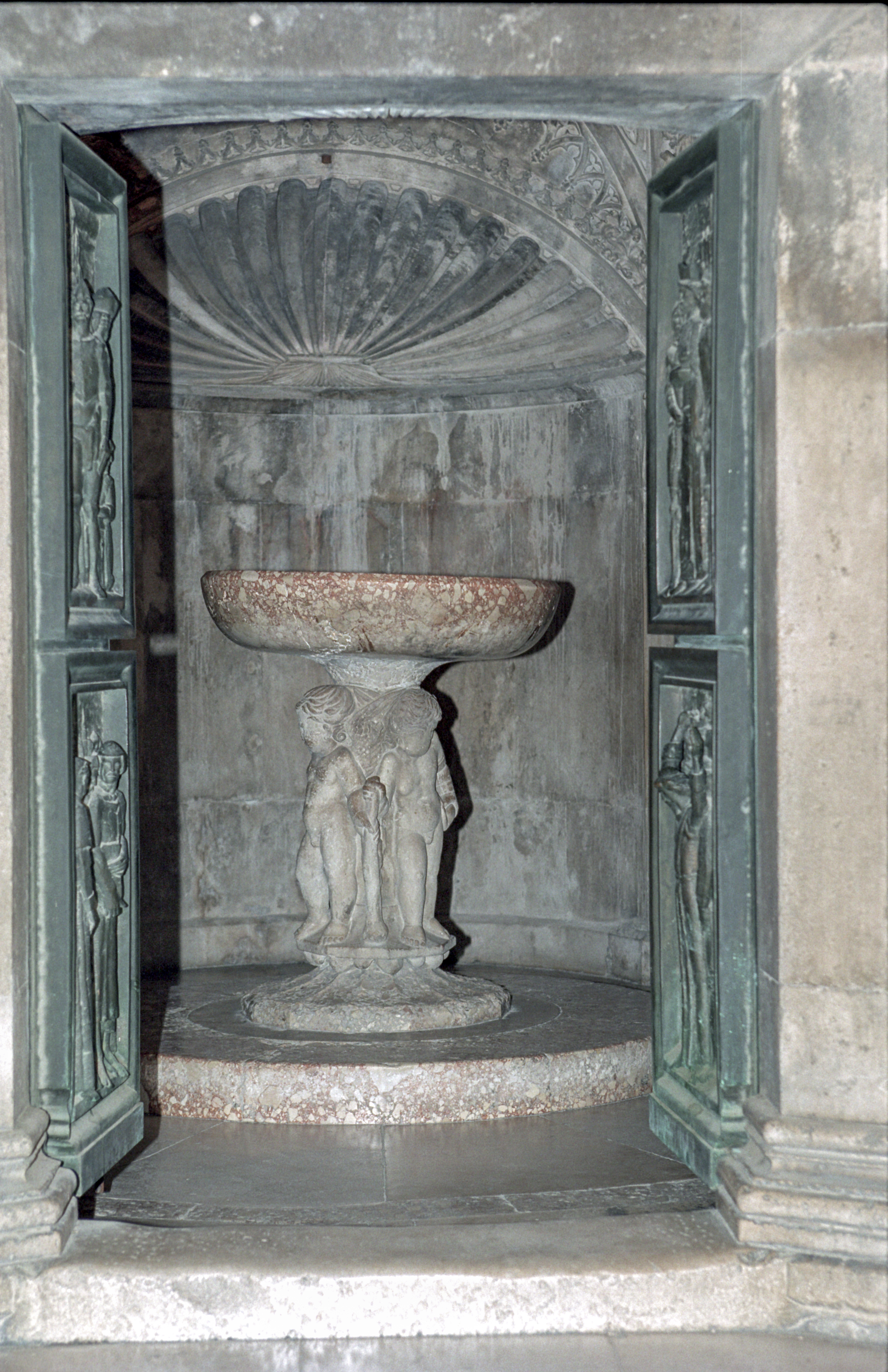
The baptistery

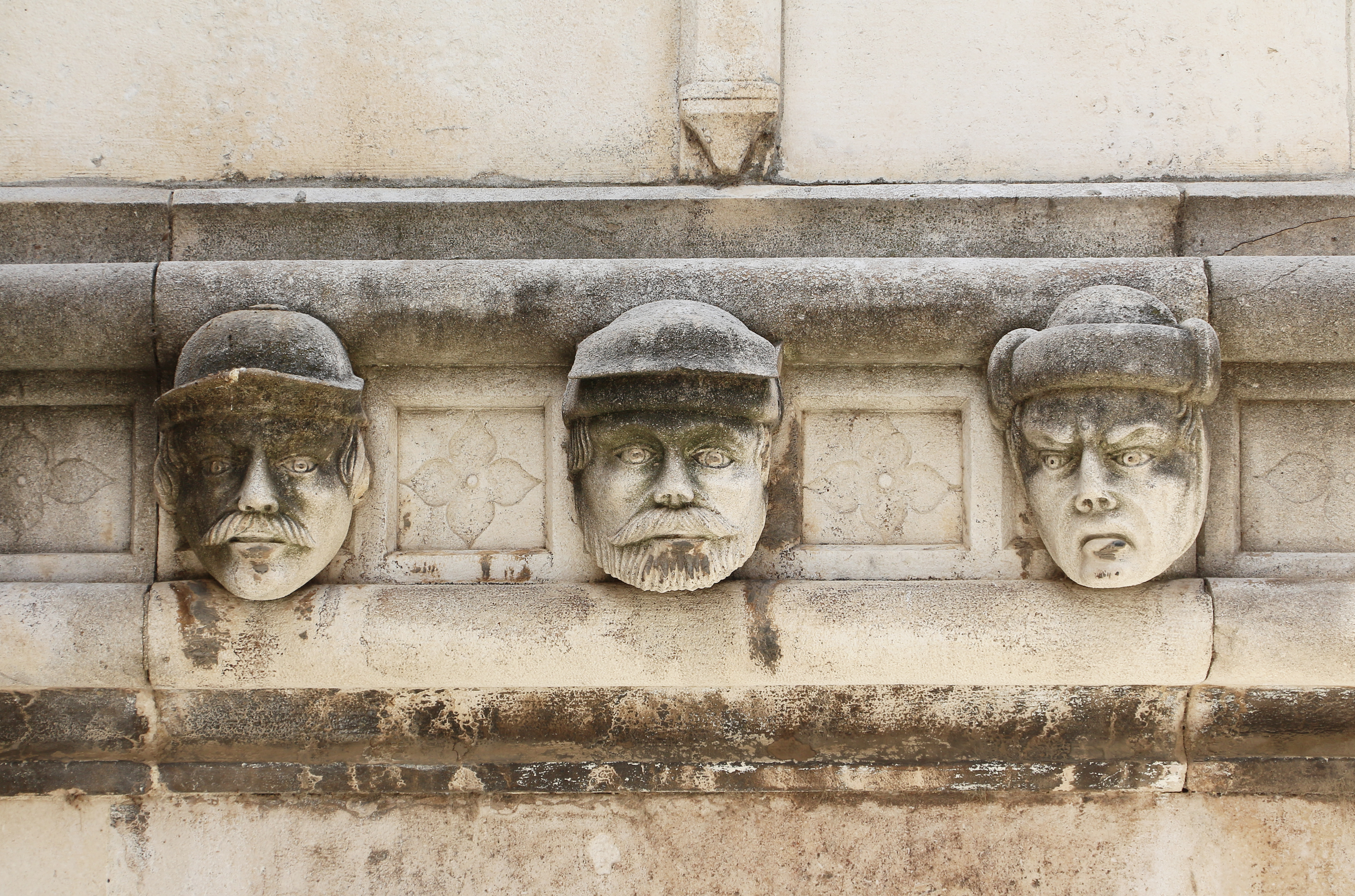
Heads on the exterior depict unknown individuals

Video overview

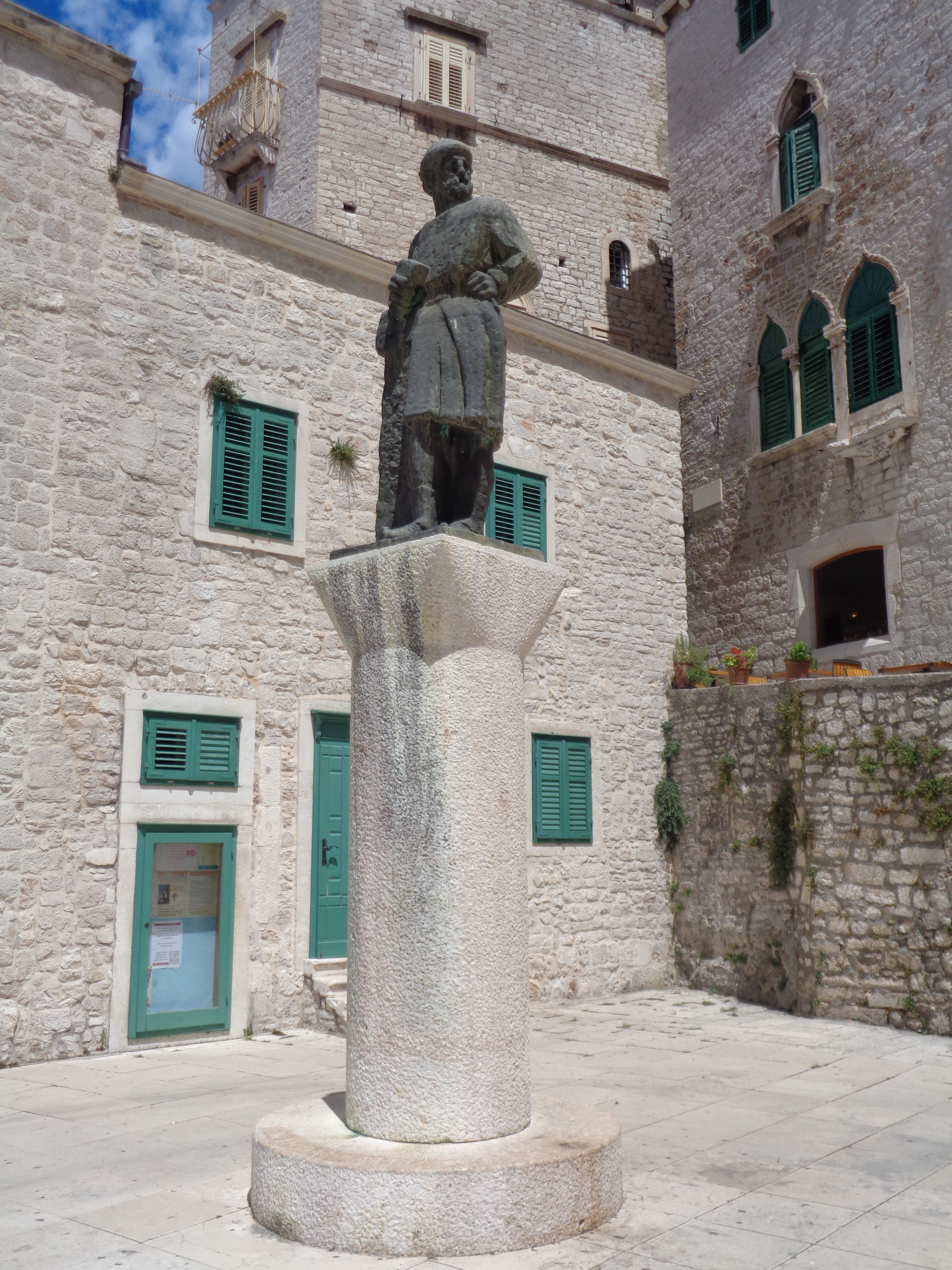
Sculpture of Juraj Dalmatinac, the constructor of the cathedral, in front of the main entrance

View of Šibenik Cathedral from St Michael's Fortress

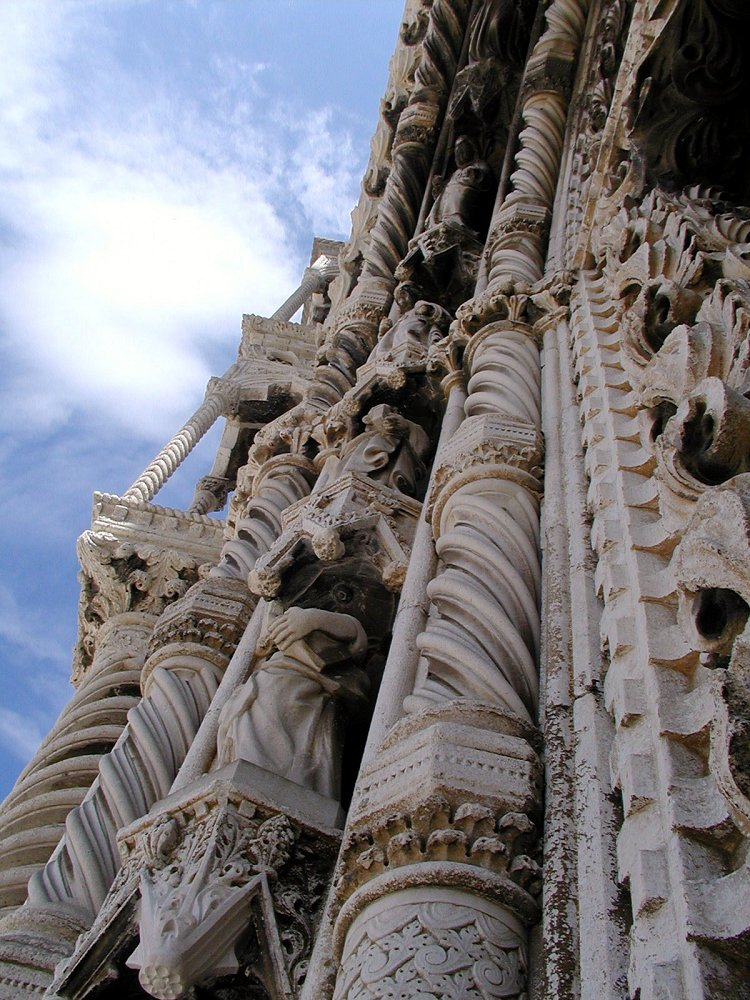
Details of the main portal

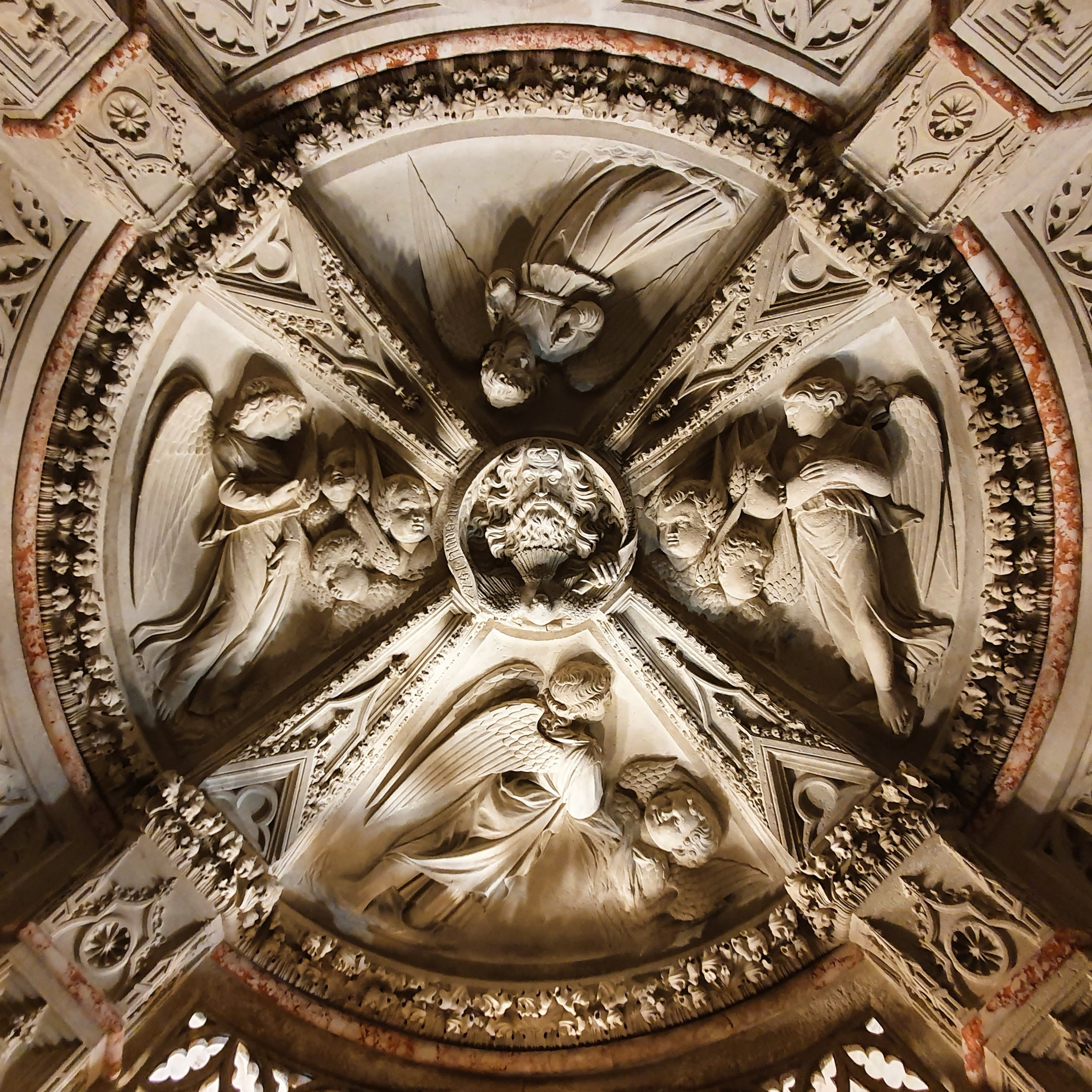
Baptistery’s dome

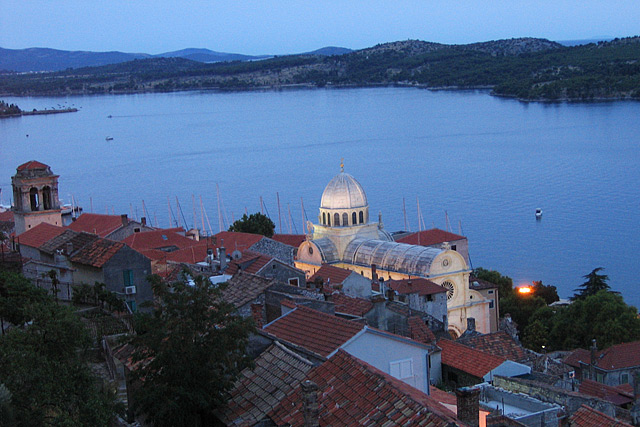
Cathedral at dawn

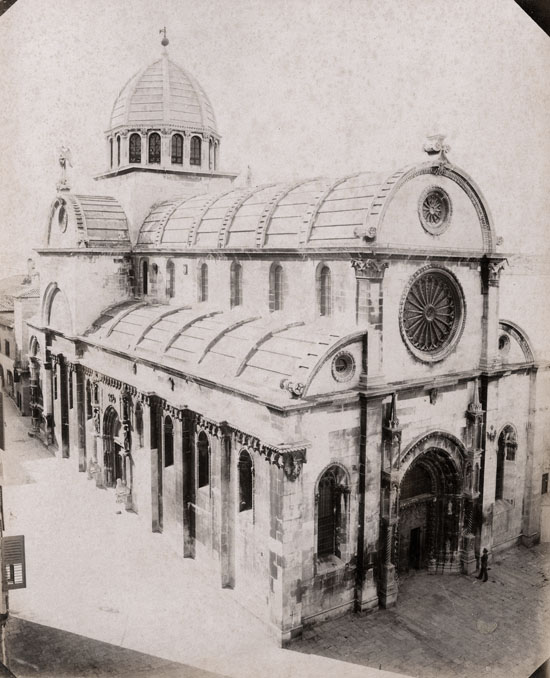
Franz Laforest, "Sebenico", circa 1880

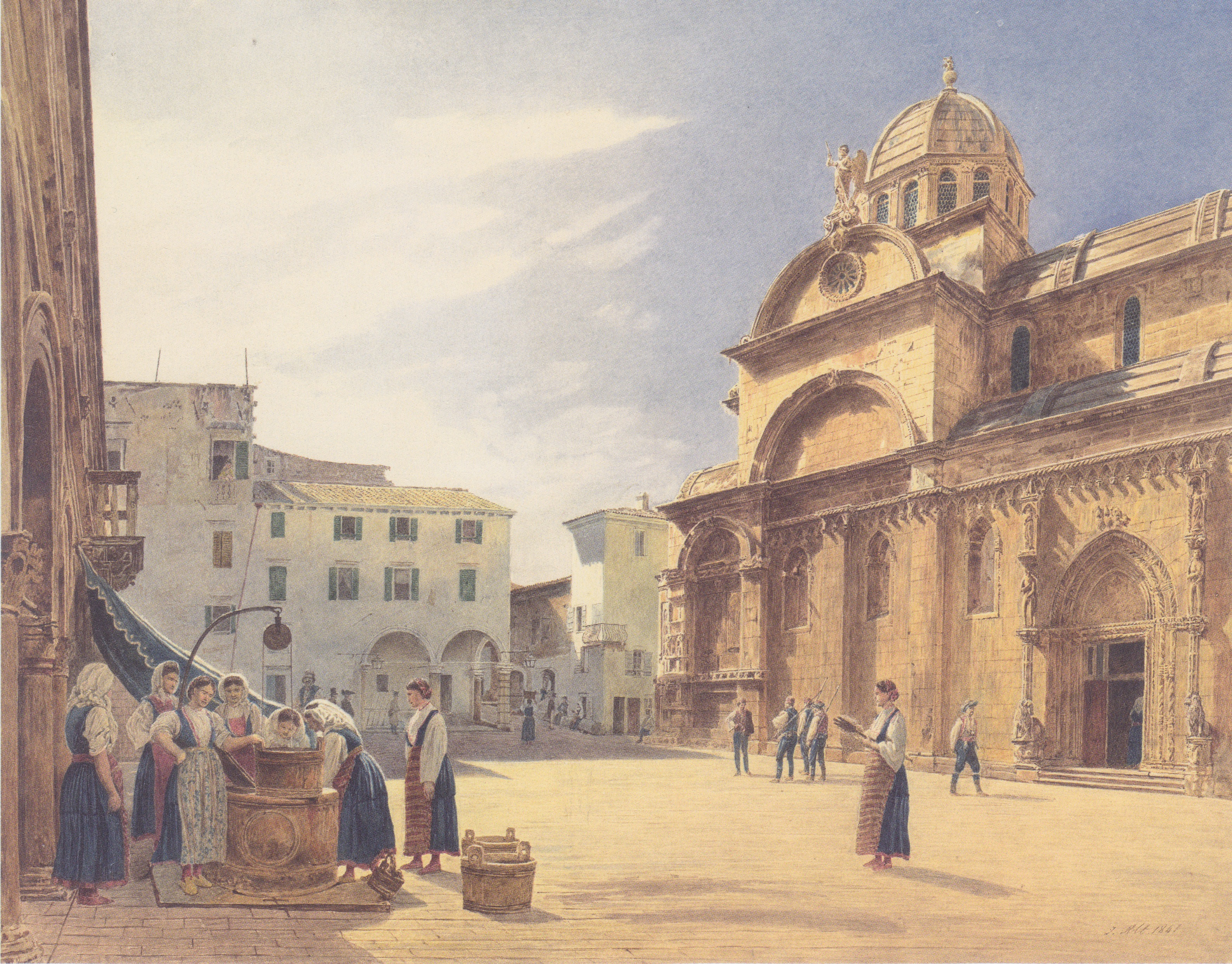
Jakob Alt, "Piazza Grande mit der Domkirche von Sebenico", 1841

== See also ==
- Late medieval domes
