= Andrea Alessi =

Venetian architect and sculptor

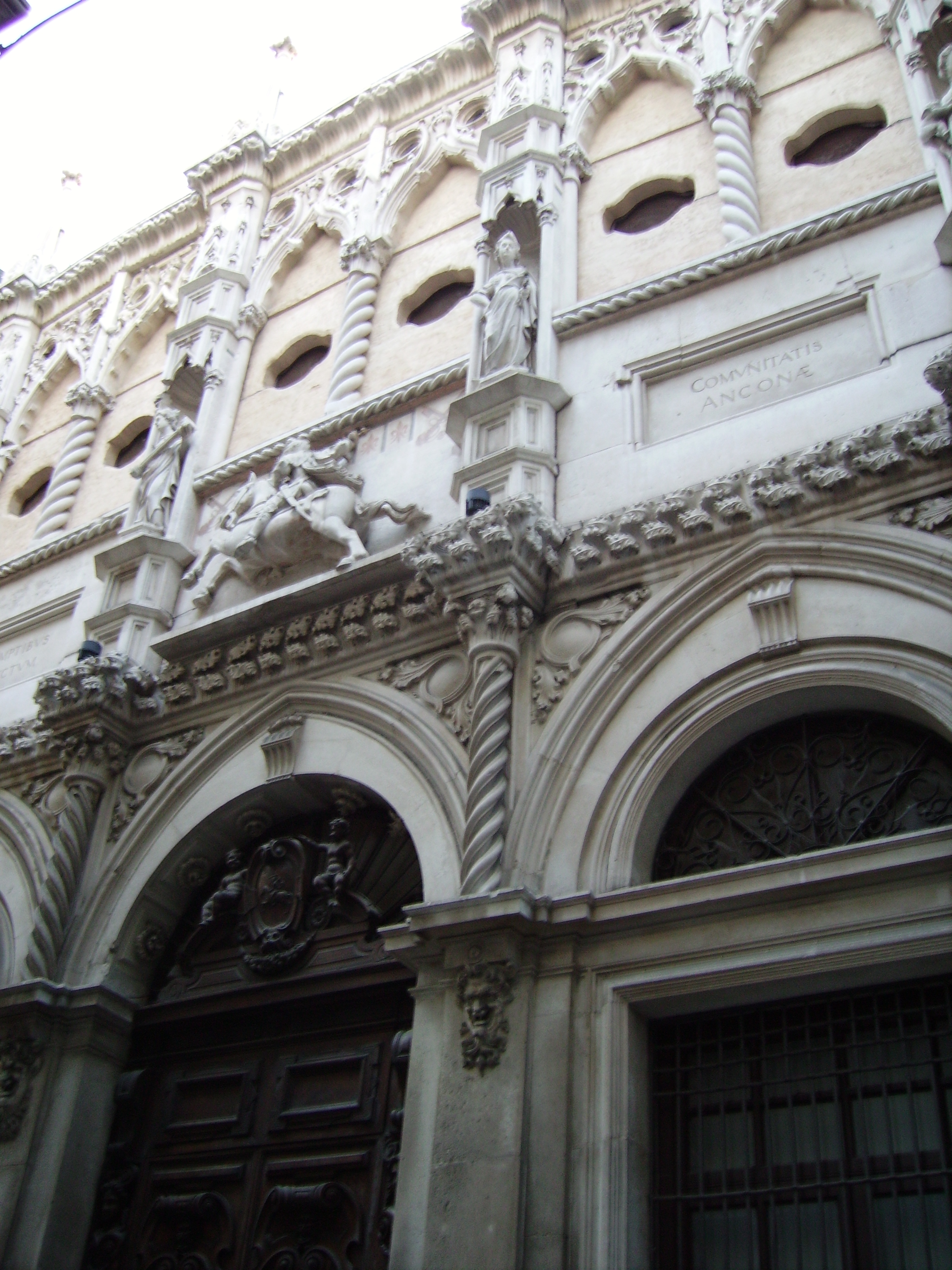
- Works of Alessi in Ancona
- Born: c. 1425; Durazzo, Albania, Venetian Republic (now Durrës, Albania)
- Died: 1504 or 1505 (aged about 80); Split, Dalmatia, Venetian Republic (now Split, Croatia)
- Occupations: Architect, sculptor, artist
- Notable work: The Baptistry of Trogir

Andrea Alessi (Albanian: Andrea Nikollë Aleksi, Croatian: Andrija Aleši, c. 1425 – 1504/05) was a Venetian architect and sculptor considered one of the most distinguished artists of Venetian Dalmatia.

== Life ==
Andrea Alessi was born around 1425 in the city of Durazzo in the area ruled and influenced by Venetians (modern day Durrës, Albania). There are questions that he may be of Albanian, rather than Italian, birth. Other sources say he was of Italian origin. He moved to the city of Split in Dalmatia during the Republic of Venice, where he studied under sculptor Mark Troja. He lived most of his life and conducted much of his work in Dalmatia, working in Split, Šibenik, Zadar, Rab, Trogir, Ancona, and the Tremiti Islands.

He died in Split in either 1504 or 1505 and was buried Durrës.

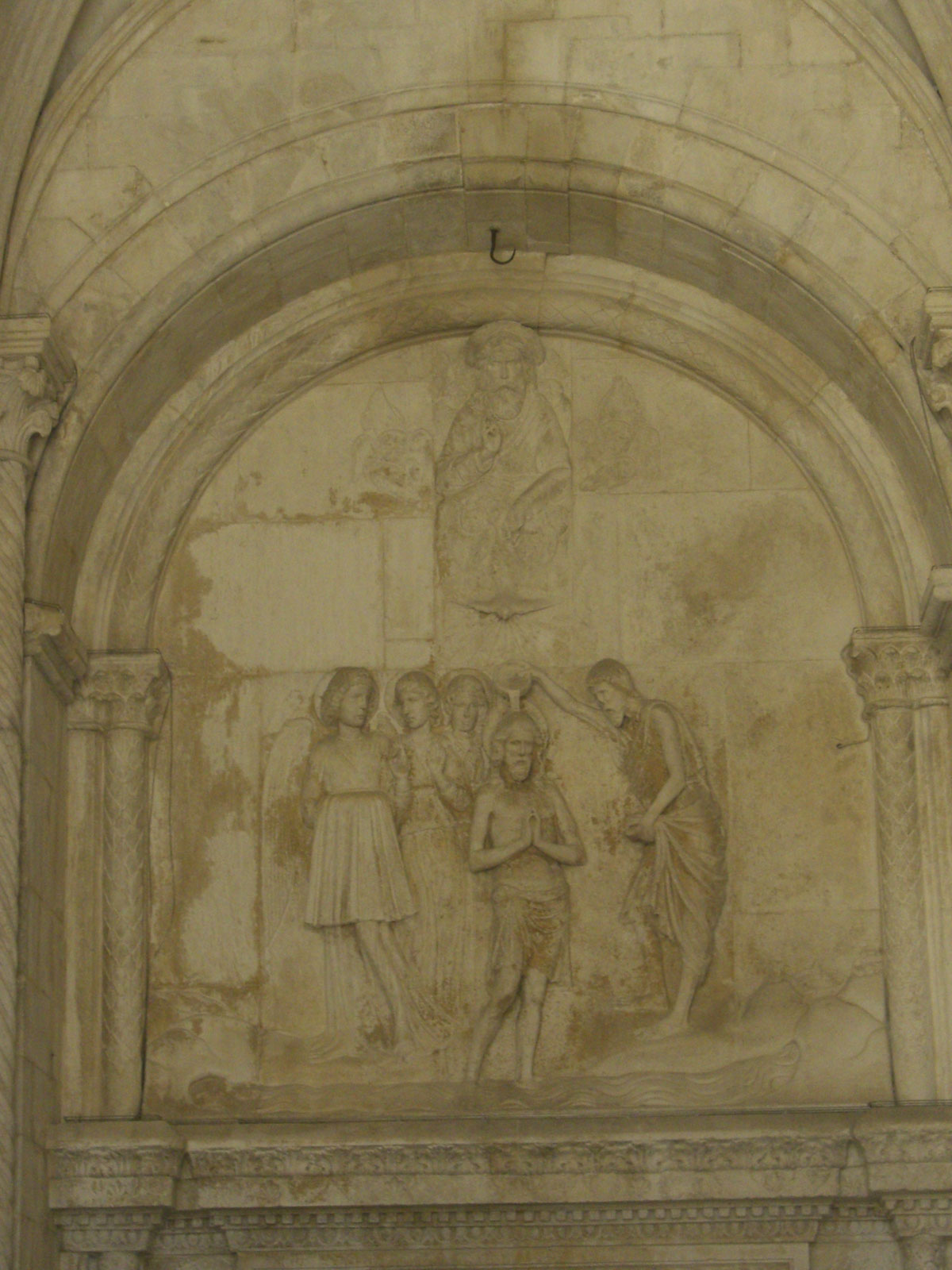
Trogir Cathedral entrance detail by Andrea Alessi

== Career ==
Alessi was a disciple of Giorgio da Sebenico, and his best-known work is with Niccolò di Giovanni Fiorentino on the expansion of the Chapel of St. John of Trogir located in Trogir that began in 1468. Just like Šibenik Cathedral of Saint James in Dalmatia, the Chapel of was composed out of large stone blocks with extreme precision. It is unique harmony of architecture and sculpture according to antique ideals. From inside, there is no flat wall. In the middle of chapel, on the altar, lays the sarcophagus of blessed John of Trogir. Surrounding are reliefs of puttos carrying torches that look like they were peeping out of doors of Underworld. Above them there are niches with sculptures of Christ and apostles (the principle work of Alessi), amongst them are putties, circular windows encircled with fruit garland, and a relief of Nativity. All is ceiled with coffered ceiling with image of God in the middle and ninety-six portrait heads of angels. With so many faces of smiling children the chapel looks very cheerful and there isn’t nothing similar in European art of that time.

Andrea is best known for his merchant statues in Ancona, Italy, and his mural paintings in the Trogir Cathedral, particularly The Baptistry of Trogir. He signed the Trogir Baptistery in 1467 with: ANDREAS ALEXIUS DURRACHINUS OPIFEX MCCCCLXII (Andreas Alexius, artisan from Durrës, 1462).
