= Niccolò di Giovanni Fiorentino =

Italian sculptor

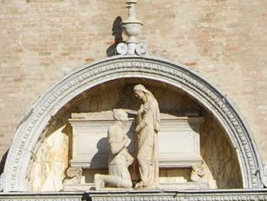
The grave of Ser Vittore Cappello in the Church of Saint Helen in Venice, made by Niccolò Fiorentino.

Niccolò di Giovanni Fiorentino (Croatian: Nikola Firentinac) called Nicolas of Florence (1418 in Bagno a Ripoli – 1506 in Šibenik), was an Italian Renaissance sculptor and architect, active in Venice and Dalmatia.

== Biography ==
He is best known by his work on the Šibenik Cathedral of St James, in 1455. After the death of Giorgio da Sebenico, Niccolò finished the cathedral and its original stone dome, following the original plans of Giorgio.

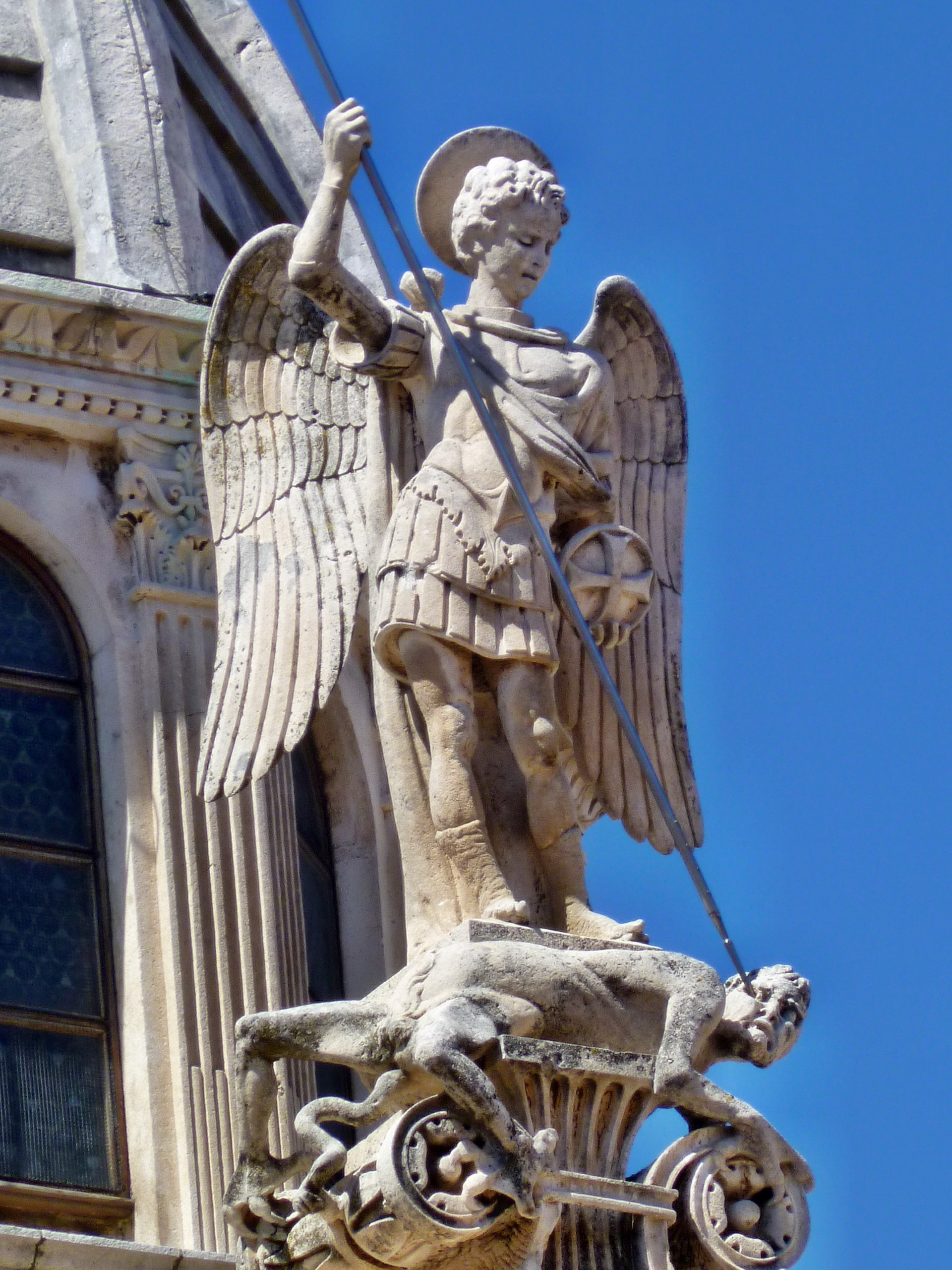
St.Michael, sculpture by Niccolò di Giovanni Fiorentino on the dome of the Šibenik Cathedral of St James, Croatia

Before 1457 he probably worked with Donatello in Padua, between 1457 and 1468 was active in Venice but moved after to Dalmatia where he worked until his death in 1506.

Work on Šibenik cathedral inspired Niccolò for his work on the expansion of chapel of Blessed John from Trogir in 1468. Just like the Šibenik cathedral, it was composed of large stone blocks with extreme precision. In cooperation with a disciple of Giorgio, Andrea Alessi, Niccolò achieved close harmony of architecture and sculpture according to antique ideals. From inside, there is no flat wall. In the middle of chapel, on the altar, lies the sarcophagus of blessed John of Trogir. Surrounding this are reliefs of genies carrying torches as if peering out of the doors of the underworld. Above them there are niches with sculptures of Christ and the apostles, among of which are putti, circular windows encircled with fruit garland, and a relief of Nativity. All feature a coffered ceiling with an image of God in the middle and 96 portrait of angels' heads. With so many faces of smiling children, the chapel looks very cheerful, unlike other European art of that time.

== See also ==
- Šibenik Cathedral
- Renaissance architecture
