= List of people from Croatia =

Flag of Croatia (Zastava Republike Hrvatske)

The following is a list of prominent individuals who are or were Croatian citizens or of Croatian ancestry.

== Art ==
=== Architecture ===
- Viktor Axmann – architect
- Nikola Bašić – architect
- Vjekoslav Bastl – architect
- Julio Deutsch – architect
- Hugo Ehrlich – architect
- Ignjat Fischer – architect
- Stjepan Gomboš – architect
- Vjekoslav Heinzel
- Leo Hönigsberg – architect
- Lavoslav Horvat
- Drago Ibler
- Viktor Kovačić – architect
- Slavko Löwy – architect
- Rudolf Lubinski – architect
- Paskoje Miličević Mihov – architect
- Vlado Milunić – architect
- Juraj Neidhardt – architect
- Velimir Neidhardt – architect
- Stjepan Planić – architect
- Vjenceslav Richter – architect
- Vladimir Šterk – architect
- Anđeo Lovrov Zadranin – architect

=== Sculpture ===
- Antun Augustinčić
- Lujo Bezeredi
- Andrija Buvina
- Frane Cota
- Ante Dabro
- Juraj Dalmatinac
- Branislav Dešković
- Ivan Duknović
- Dušan Džamonja
- Robert Frangeš-Mihanović
- Ivo Kerdić
- Albert Kinert
- Ivan Kožarić
- Frano Kršinić
- Vasko Lipovac
- Ivan Meštrović
- Oscar Nemon
- Dimitrije Popović
- Kosta Angeli Radovani
- Vanja Radauš
- Master Radovan
- Ivan Rendić
- Toma Rosandić
- Branko Ružić
- Ivan Sabolić
- Petar Smajić
- Aleksandar Srnec
- Marija Ujević-Galetović
- Maksimilijan Vanka
- Franjo Vranjanin

=== Painting ===
- Oskar Alexander
- Lovro Artuković
- Vladimir Becić
- Federico Bencovich
- Lujo Bezeredi
- Charles Billich
- Nikola Božidarević
- Vlaho Bukovac
- Eugen Buktenica
- Bela Čikoš Sesija – painter, representative of symbolism: art-deco and art nouveau
- Menci Clement Crnčić
- Josip Crnobori
- Lovro Dobričević
- Jelena Dorotka
- Davor Džalto
- Marta Ehrlich
- Emerik Feješ
- Eva Fischer
- Alen Floričić
- Dragan Gaži
- Vilko Gecan
- Ivan Generalić – naïve art
- Josip Generalić
- Oton Gliha
- Petar Grgec
- Krsto Hegedušić
- Oskar Herman
- Josip Horvat Međimurec
- Mirko Ilić – cartoonist, graphic designer
- Nina Ivančić
- Oton Iveković
- Marijan Jevšovar
- Ignjat Job
- Drago Jurak
- Gabrijel Jurkić
- Vjekoslav Karas
- John of Kastav
- Albert Kinert
- Željko Kipke
- Mira Klobučar
- Juraj Julije Klović – portrait miniatures
- Tripo Kokolja
- Edo Kovačević
- Mijo Kovačić
- Ladislav Kralj
- Miroslav Kraljević
- Živa Kraus
- Kristian Kreković
- Vlado Kristl
- Tomislav Krizman
- Izidor Kršnjavi
- Ferdinand Kulmer
- Ivan Lacković Croata – naïve art
- Vasko Lipovac
- Zvonimir Lončarić
- Dora Maar – photographer, painter, model
- Andrija Maurović – illustrator
- Mato Celestin Medović
- Martin Mehkek
- Ivan Milat-Luketa
- Jerolim Miše
- Antun Motika
- Franjo Mraz
- Edo Murtić
- Virgilije Nevjestić
- Vera Nikolić Podrinska
- Alfred Pal
- Ordan Petlevski
- Ivan Picelj
- Dimitrije Popović
- Oton Postružnik
- Ivan Rabuzin – naïve art
- Josip Račić
- Mirko Rački
- Božidar Rašica
- Slava Raškaj
- Ivan Rein
- Martino Rota
- Đuro Seder
- Zlatko Sirotić
- Matija Skurjeni
- Petar Smajić
- Aleksandar Srnec
- Miljenko Stančić
- Slavko Stolnik
- Zlatko Šulentić
- Miroslav Šutej
- Marino Tartaglia
- Đuro Tiljak
- Ivan Tišov
- Lavoslav Torti
- Marijan Trepše
- Ana Tzarev – naïve art
- Milivoj Uzelac – painter
- Maksimilijan Vanka
- Vladimir Varlaj
- Ivan Večenaj
- Matko Vekić
- Mladen Veža – illustrator
- Emanuel Vidović
- Mirko Virius – naïve art
- Adolf Waldinger
- Viktor Đerek – photographer

=== Film and theatre ===
- Ante Babaja
- Steve Bacic
- Eric Bana – actor
- Relja Bašić – actor
- Branko Bauer
- George Beban – actor, director, writer and producer
- Ena Begović
- Mia Begović
- Rene Bitorajac
- Mirjana Bohanec
- Slavko Brankov
- Vinko Brešan – director
- Veljko Bulajić – film director
- Zlatko Burić – actor
- Boris Buzančić – actor
- Nathaniel Buzolic – actor
- Al Christy – actor
- Petra Cicvarić
- Christina Cindrich – television producer, host, and actress
- Zlatko Crnković – actor
- Zrinka Cvitešić
- Nataša Dorčić
- Vanja Drach
- Claire Du Brey – actress
- Vlatko Dulić – actor
- Boris Dvornik – actor
- Jenna Elfman – television and movie actress
- Stipe Erceg – actor
- Nela Eržišnik – actress, comedian
- Judah Friedlander – actor and comedian
- Mira Furlan – actress (Babylon 5, Lost)
- Gallagher – comedian and prop comic
- Gianni Garko - actor
- Stanka Gjurić – actress, writer, filmmaker
- Emil Glad
- Ratko Glavina
- Obrad Gluščević
- Ljupka Gojić – model
- Krešo Golik
- Frank Gorshin – actor and comedian
- Ivo Gregurević
- Gloria Grey – screen, stage actress and director
- Goran Grgić
- Rajko Grlić
- Fedor Hanžeković
- Ivan Herceg – actor
- Werner Herzog – film director, producer, screenwriter, actor, and opera director
- Alaina Huffman
- Željko Ivanek – actor
- Nives Ivanković
- Anne Jackson – actress
- Nataša Janjić
- Toni Jeričević
- Anthony Jeselnik – comedian
- Mladen Juran
- Sena Jurinac
- Jagoda Kaloper
- Saby Kamalich
- Sonja Kastl
- Donna Kelce - actor
- Ljubomir Kerekeš
- Michael Klesic – actor
- Matija Kluković
- Sylva Koscina – actress, model
- Mario Kovač – theatre and film director
- Robert Kurbaša
- Frano Lasić
- John G. Lenic
- Rachel Leskovac – actress
- Edvin Liverić
- Leon Lučev
- Branko Lustig – film producer
- Franjo Majetić
- John Malkovich
- Dalibor Matanić
- Nevio Marasović
- Branko Marjanović
- Stojan Matavulj
- Mark Matkevich – actor
- Rene Medvešek
- Sven Medvešek
- Oktavijan Miletić
- Ivana Miličević – actress
- Vatroslav Mimica
- Ildy Modrovich – television producer, writer and singer
- Nina Morić – model
- Patrick Muldoon – actor
- Lorenzo Music – actor, voice actor, writer, television producer and musician
- Antun Nalis – actor
- Bojan Navojec
- Antonio Nuić
- Zrinko Ogresta
- Marija Omaljev-Grbić
- Mia Oremović
- Krsto Papić – film director
- Leona Paraminski
- Frank Pavich – film director, producer
- Stjepan Perić
- Anton Perich – filmmaker, photographer and video artist
- Edo Peročević – actor, radio speaker
- Žarko Potočnjak
- Alma Prica
- Ivica Rajković - cinematographer
- Zvonimir Rogoz – actor
- Rick Rossovich – actor
- Branko Schmidt
- Lucija Šerbedžija
- Ivo Serdar
- Shaun Sipos – actor
- Joseph Sirola - actor and producer
- Marija Škaričić
- Mia Čorak Slavenska – prima ballerina
- Tonko Soljan – film and television producer
- Fabijan Šovagović – actor
- Filip Šovagović
- Gabriela Spanic – actress
- Lita Stantic – producer, screenplay writer, and director
- Nera Stipičević
- Yvonne Suhor – actress
- Ognjen Sviličić
- Nikola Tanhofer
- Vanessa Terkes – actress, TV show host in Latin America of Croatian descent
- Ivica Vidović
- Goran Višnjić – actor (ER)
- Zlatko Vitez
- Antun Vrdoljak – film director
- Severina Vučković – entertainer, actress
- Dianne Wiest – American actress
- Anthony Yerkovich – television producer and writer
- Matthew Yuricich – special effects artist
- Richard Yuricich – special visual effects artist
- Lordan Zafranović
- Louis Zorich – American actor
- Jim Zulevic – actor, comedian, TV writer, and radio host

=== Media ===
- Lidia Bastianich – American celebrity chef, television host, author, and restaurateur
- Adrian Chiles – British television and radio presenter
- Slavica Ecclestone – British-Croatian former model
- Robert Herjavec – Canadian businessman, investor, author, dancer, and television personality from Shark Tank
- Vladimir Herzog – Croatian-born Brazilian journalist
- Bill Kurtis – journalist, television reporter, producer
- Goran Milić – journalist
- Katie Pavlich – American conservative commentator, author, blogger, podcaster
- Gene Rayburn – American radio and television personality.
- Tony Robbins – American life coach, self-help author and motivational speaker
- Teresa Scanlan – Miss America 2011
- Petra Stunt – British designer
- Matija Babić

== Academics ==
=== History ===
- James Belich – historian
- Julije Kempf – historian, writer
- Nada Klaić – historian
- Vjekoslav Klaić – historian
- Ivan Kukuljević Sakcinski – historian
- Ivan Lučić – historian
- Dominik Mandić – historian
- Franjo Rački – historian
- Ivan Ratkaj – historian, Jesuit, explorer
- Juraj Ratkaj – historian
- Ferdo Šišić – historian
- Ludovicus Tubero – historian
- Franjo Tuđman – historian, politician

=== Invention ===
- Zlata Bartl – inventor of Vegeta
- Josip Belušić – inventor
- Franjo Hannaman – inventor, engineer
- Marcel Kiepach – inventor
- Mario Kovač – computer engineering professor and inventor
- Ferdinand Kovačević – inventor
- Giovanni Luppis – inventor of the torpedo
- Slavoljub Eduard Penkala – inventor
- Andrija Puharich - medical and parapsychological researcher, medical inventor, physician and author
- Mario Puratić – inventor who made major advances in fishing technology
- Ralph Sarich – inventor of the orbital engine
- David Schwarz – aviation pioneer of Jewish ancestry
- Marin Soljačić – inventor of wireless energy transfer
- Ante Šupuk – engineer
- Tomislav Uzelac – programmer, inventor of the first successful MP3 player
- Faust Vrančić – inventor of the parachute
- Ivan Vučetić – inventor of dactyloscopy

=== Social science ===
- Ivan Belostenec – lexicographer
- Juraj Dobrila – cleric, benefactor
- Elsie Ivancich Dunin – cultural ethnologist, author, professor, choreographer
- Krešimir Filić – historian and museologist
- Ljudevit Gaj – linguist, reformer
- Vatroslav Jagić – philologist
- Milan Kangrga – philosopher
- Bartol Kašić – lexicographer
- Juraj Križanić – social philosopher
- Franjo Kuhač – folklorist, ethnologist
- Jakov Mikalja – linguist and lexicographer
- Miroslav Radman – genetic biologist
- Stanislav Pavao Skalić – encyclopedist, adventurer
- Rudolf Steiner – philosopher
- Josip Juraj Strossmayer – cleric, benefactor
- Rudi Supek – philosopher
- Henry Suzzallo – educator
- Ante Topić-Mimara – art collector
- Vinko Žganec – folklorist, ethnomusicologist

=== Science ===
- Gaja Alaga – physicist
- Giorgio Baglivi – physician and scientist from Ragusa
- Antun Karlo Bakotić – physicist and writer
- Mladen Bestvina – mathematician
- Ruđer Bošković – theologian, physicist, astronomer, mathematician, philosopher, diplomat, poet, Jesuit and polymath
- Branko Bošnjaković – physicist, environmentalist
- Fran Bošnjaković – engineer, physicist
- Juraj Božičević – engineer
- Spiridon Brusina – malacologist
- Frane Bulić – archaeologist
- Predrag Cvitanović – physicist
- Milislav Demerec – biologist
- Andrija Dudić – naturalist, astronomer, physician
- William Feller – mathematician
- Andrija Fuderer – chemist, chess player
- Artur Gavazzi – geographer
- Marin Getaldić – physicist, mathematician
- Vladimir Jurko Glaser – physicist
- Dragutin Gorjanović-Kramberger – geologist, paleoanthropologist and paleontologist
- Stjepan Gradić – mathematician, philosopher, physicist, writer and polymath
- Mirko Dražen Grmek – physician, science writer and historian
- Branko Horvat – economist
- Željko Ivezić – astrophysicist
- Ivo Jajic – physician
- Zvonimir Janko – mathematician
- Korado Korlević – astronomer, asteroid discoverer
- Oton Kučera – mathematician, physicist
- Zvonko Kusić – physician
- Jacob Matijevic – NASA engineer
- Eduard Miloslavić – physician
- Andrija Mohorovičić – geophysicist
- Stjepan Mohorovičić – physicist
- Grga Novak – archaeologist, historian
- Franjo Petriš – philosopher, humanist, writer and polymath
- Đuro Pilar – geologist
- Stjepan Poljak – physician
- Eduard Prugovečki – physicist, writer
- Miroslav Radman – biologist
- Paško Rakić – neuroscientist
- Goran Senjanović – physicist
- Zvonimir Šeparović – lawyer, (victimology)
- Ante Šercer – physician
- Mihalj Šilobod Bolšić – Roman Catholic priest, mathematician, writer, and musical theorist who wrote the first Croatian arithmetic textbook
- Marin Soljačić – physicist
- Andrija Štampar – physician, diplomat
- Marijan Šunjić – physicist
- Ivan Supek – physicist, philosopher
- Ćiro Truhelka – archaeologist and art historian
- Vladimir Varičak – mathematician, physicist
- Mirko Vidaković – forester, botanist
- Nikola Vitov Gučetić – statesmen, philosopher, science writer
- Zoran Vondraček - mathematician
- Faust Vrančić – philosopher, thinker
- Vladimir Vranić – mathematician
- Juan Vucetich – anthropologist, police official who pioneered fingerprinting
- Vladimir Žerjavić – statistician, economist

== Nobel Prize ==
- Paul L. Modrich – chemistry
- Vladimir Prelog – chemistry
- John M. Martinis – physics
- Leopold Ružička – chemistry
- Ivo Andrić – literature

== Music ==
=== Composers ===
- Julije Bajamonti – composer, encyclopedist
- Krešimir Baranović – composer, conductor
- Blagoje Bersa – composer
- Franjo Dugan – composer, organist
- Jakov Gotovac – composer
- Josip Hatze
- Milan Horvat – composer, conductor
- Vinko Jelić – Baroque composer, singer
- Ivo Josipović – composer, 3rd President of Croatia
- Anđelko Klobučar – composer, organist
- Igor Kuljerić – composer, conductor
- Fran Lhotka
- Vatroslav Lisinski
- Clair Marlo – composer, real name Clara Veseliza
- Lovro von Matačić – composer, conductor
- Johnny Mercer – American lyricist, singer-songwriter; co-founder of Capitol Records
- Lav Mirski – composer, conductor
- Ivan Padovec – composer
- Boris Papandopulo – conductor, composer
- Dora Pejačević – composer, pianist
- Milan Sachs – composer, conductor
- Luka Sorkočević – composer
- Franz von Suppé – composer of light operas, born and raised in the Kingdom of Dalmatia
- Josip Štolcer-Slavenski – composer
- Stjepan Šulek – composer, conductor, violinist
- Vjekoslav Šutej – composer, conductor
- Ivo Tijardović – composer, writer
- Ivan Zajc – composer, conductor

=== Classical ===
- Zlatko Baloković – violinist
- Max Emanuel Cenčić – countertenor
- Valter Dešpalj – cellist
- Tugomir Franc – opera singer
- Lidija Horvat-Dunjko, soprano
- Sena Jurinac – opera singer
- Franjo Krežma – violinist
- Stephen Kovacevich – classical pianist
- Ivo Maček – pianist
- Lovro von Matačić – conductor
- Zinka Kunc-Milanov – soprano
- Maksim Mrvica – pianist
- Tomislav Mužek – tenor
- Ivo Pogorelić – pianist
- Ema Pukšec (Ilma De Murska) – opera singer
- Ruža Pospiš-Baldani – mezzo-soprano
- Vjekoslav Šutej – conductor
- Milka Trnina – soprano
- Dunja Vejzović – soprano
- Ana Vidović – guitarist
- Dubravka Zubović – opera singer and voice teacher

=== Popular ===
- 2Cellos – cellist duo
- Baby Lasagna - singer, songwriter, music producer and guitarist
- Nina Badrić — pop singer and songwriter
- Lidija Bajuk – musician
- Franka Batelić — singer-songwriter
- Claudia Beni — pop singer
- Maja Blagdan — pop singer
- Roko Blažević — pop singer
- Zvonko Bogdan – singer and performer of traditional folk songs
- Marko Bošnjak — singer-songwriter
- Michael Bublé – singer
- Mate Bulić – singer
- Tony Butala – singer of The Lettermen
- Tony Cetinski — pop singer
- Colonia – dance music group
- Igor Cukrov — singer- songwriter and musician
- Arsen Dedić – composer and singer
- Veljko Despot – discographer
- Mia Dimšić — pop singer
- Darko Domijan – singer
- Oliver Dragojević – singer
- Dragonfly — group
- Doris Dragović – singer
- E.N.I. (band) — pop band and girl group
- Sergio Endrigo – singer
- Feminnem — girl group
- Flyer – band
- Gibonni – singer
- Davor Gobac – singer
- Albina Grčić — singer
- Grše – rapper
- Bobby Grubic – songwriter/composer, singer, music director and producer
- Stjepan Hauser – cellist
- Jacques Houdek
- Dino Jelusić – rock singer, musician, and songwriter
- Delo Jusic – composer
- Goran Karan — singer-songwriter
- Damir Kedžo — pop singer
- Tereza Kesovija – singer
- Daria Kinzer — singer
- Klapa s Mora — music ensemble
- Mišo Kovač
- Nina Kraljić — singer-songwriter
- Kraljevi ulice — band
- Lelek, folk pop all female band
- Let 3 — rock band
- Josipa Lisac – singer
- Lorde – singer-songwriter
- Radoslav Lorković – folk and blues singer, pianist, accordionist
- Magazin – pop band
- Clair Marlo – singer-songwriter, composer, record producer
- Danijela Martinović — pop singer
- Miljenko Matijevic – rock singer (Steelheart)
- Miach – singer
- Branko Mihaljević – composer, writer, journalist and radio editor
- Sandra Mihanovich – singer, musician, and composer
- Ivan Mikulić — singer
- Guy Mitchell – singer
- Alan Merrill – vocalist, guitarist, songwriter, actor and model
- Helen Merrill – jazz singer
- Tomo Milicevic – 30 Seconds to Mars
- Paul Mirkovich – musician, musical director
- Milan Mladenović – singer, guitar player
- Drago Mlinarec – rock singer-songwriter
- Larry Muhoberac – American musician, record producer, and composer
- Nikolija – singer
- Boris Novković – pop singer
- Krist Novoselić – rock musician (Nirvana)
- Jurica Pađen – rock singer-songwriter
- David Paich – American musician, best known as the co-founder, principal songwriter, keyboardist and secondary vocalist of the rock band Toto
- Daniella Pavicic – singer-songwriter
- Marko Perković Thompson – rock singer
- Vesna Pisarović — pop and jazz singer
- Plavka - American singer
- Put — pop group
- Riva – band, 1989 Eurovision song contest winners
- Ivo Robić – singer
- Darko Rundek – singer and actor
- Saša, Tin i Kedžo – first Croatian boy band
- Severina — singer—songwriter
- Krunoslav "Kićo" Slabinac – singer and composer of traditional folk songs
- Jura Stublić – rock singer
- Ivica Šerfezi – singer
- Miroslav Škoro – singer
- Branimir Štulić (Djoni) – rock singer-songwriter
- Luka Šulić – cellist
- Andrea Šušnjara
- The Bambi Molesters – rock band
- Dado Topić — rock musician
- Elizabeth Anka Vajagic – singer/guitarist
- Vanna — singer
- Johnny Vidacovich – drummer
- Siniša Vuco – singer
- Severina Vučković – pop singer
- Vice Vukov – singer

=== Teachers ===
- Frane Selak – music teacher

== Literature ==
- Ivan Aralica – writer
- Franjo Babić – writer, journalist
- Juraj Baraković – poet
- Milan Begović – writer
- Sabo Bobaljević – poet
- Lukrecija Bogašinović Budmani – poet
- Ivana Brlić-Mažuranić – writer
- Mile Budak – writer
- Dobriša Cesarić – writer
- Milan Crnković – writer
- Džore Držić – poet, playwright
- Slavenka Drakulić – writer, journalist
- Tomislav Dretar – writer, politician, journalist, critic
- Marin Držić – writer
- Ignjat Đurđević – poet, translator, historian, astronomer and Benedict monk
- Viktor Car Emin – writer from Istria
- Filip Erceg – writer and socialist politician
- Đuro Ferić – poet
- Drago Gervais – poet and playwright, paternal French descent
- Đivo Šiškov Gundulić – poet, dramatist and nobleman
- Ksaver Šandor Gjalski – writer
- Stanka Gjurić – poet and essayist
- Ivan Gundulić – Ragusan poet
- Petar Hektorović – writer
- Miljenko Jergović – writer
- Ivan Baran – writer
- Marija Jurić Zagorka – novelist
- Andrija Kačić Miošić – poet
- Janko Polić Kamov – avant-garde writer
- Brne Karnarutić – poet
- Radoslav Katičić – linguist, classical philologist, Indo-Europeanist, Slavist and Indologist
- Snježana Kordić – linguist
- Ante Kovačić – writer
- Ivan Goran Kovačić – poet
- Ron Kovic – Vietnam War veteran, writer and peace activist
- Josip Kozarac – writer
- Silvije Strahimir Kranjčević – poet
- Miroslav Krleža – novelist, writer, philosopher, encyclopedist
- Eugen Kumičić – writer
- Tomislav Ladan – writer
- Ivo Lendić – poet, polemicist
- Hanibal Lucić – writer
- Darko Macan – writer
- Igor Mandić – journalist
- Ranko Marinković – writer
- Marko Marulić – writer
- Mara Matočec – poet, playwright
- Antun Gustav Matoš – poet
- Ivan Mažuranić – poet
- Šiško Menčetić – poet
- Mijo Mirković – writer, economist
- Vjenceslav Novak – writer
- Josip Novakovich – writer
- Janus Pannonius (Ivan Česmički) – Hungarian poet of 15th century, of Croatian descent
- Vesna Parun – poet
- Vlatko Pavletić – theorist of literature, essayist and critic, politician
- Mikša Pelegrinović – poet
- Dalibor Perković – writer
- Paula Preradović – poet
- Petar Preradović – poet
- Matija Antun Relković – writer
- Paul Salopek – journalist
- Paul Skalich – encyclopedist, Renaissance humanist and adventurer
- Antonio Skármeta – Chilean writer
- Ivan Slamnig – poet, novelist, literary theorist, translator
- Sonja Smolec – poet and writer
- Antun Sorkočević – writer, diplomat, composer
- August Šenoa – writer
- Antun Branko Šimić – poet
- Dinko Šimunović – writer
- Sunčana Škrinjarić – writer, poet, journalist
- Slobodan Šnajder – writer
- Antun Šoljan – poet
- Drago Štambuk – poet
- Dragutin Tadijanović – poet
- Mihály Táncsics – writer, teacher, journalist and politician
- Ante Tomić – writer
- Josip Eugen Tomić – writer
- Jagoda Truhelka – writer, pedagogist
- Dubravka Ugrešić – writer
- Tin Ujević – poet
- Mavro Vetranović – writer, Benedictine friar
- Viktor Vida – writer
- Mirko Vidović – writer
- Jeronim Vidulić – Renaissance poet, priest
- Grigor Vitez – poet
- Pavao Ritter Vitezović – writer, historian, linguist and publisher
- Ivo Vojnović – writer
- Stanko Vraz – poet
- Sonja Yelich – poet
- Dinko Zlatarić – poet and translator
- Petar Zoranić – writer
- Nikola Zrinski – poet, philosopher, soldier
- Aleksandar Žiljak – writer

== Business ==
- Andrónico Luksic Abaroa - Chilean businessman
- Madeline-Ann Aksich – businesswoman, philanthropist and artist
- Benedetto Cotrugli – merchant, economist, scientist, diplomat and humanist. Wrote the first description of double-entry bookkeeping.
- Mike Grgich – winemaker
- Victor Grinich – pioneer in the semiconductor industry
- Robert Herjavec – businessman, Herjavec Group, Dragons' Den and Shark Tank
- Antony Lucich-Lucas – engineer; crude oil exploration, Gulf Oil; Texaco
- Andrónico Luksic – Antofagasta PLC; richest Croat ever
- Michela Magas – designer, entrepreneur and innovation specialist
- Anthony Maglica – Maglite
- Branko Marinkovic – businessman
- Dietrich Mateschitz – billionaire, owner of Red Bull corp.
- Nicolás Mihanovich – shipping magnate
- Boris Mikšić – Cortec Corporation
- Nikola Nobilo – wine maker
- Mario Puratić – inventor, businessman
- Bill Rancic – entrepreneur
- Al Ljutic – Ljutic Industries
- Mate Rimac – Rimac Automobili and Bugatti Rimac

== Exploration ==
- Ferdinand Konščak – Jesuit missionary, explorer and cartographer
- Dragutin Lerman – explorer
- Željko Malnar – explorer, producer
- Ivan Ratkaj – Jesuit missionary, explorer and cartographer
- Mirko and Stjepan Seljan – explorers
- Ignacije Szentmartony – explorer
- Ivan Visin – explorer

== Military ==
- Edgar Angeli – Rear Admiral during World War II (ethnic Jewish)
- Vilko Begić – Colonel General during World War II
- Svetozar Borojević – Feldmarschall on the Isonzo front
- Matija Čanić – General during World War II
- Bernhard Caboga-Cerva – Feldzeugmeister of the Austrian Empire
- Josip Kazimir Drašković – General in the Seven Years' War (1756–1763)
- Mato Dukovac – Croatian World War II fighter ace
- Mirosław Ferić – Polish fighter pilot of World War II of Croatian descent
- Jure Francetić – Ustashe Commissioner
- Cvitan Galić – Croatian World War II fighter ace
- Ilija Gregorić – Military commander of rebels during the Croatian and Slovenian peasant revolt
- Matija Gubec – leader of the Croatian and Slovenian peasant revolt
- Luka Ibrišimović – Priest and Hajduk
- Đuro Jakčin – Naval Commander and first Commander of the Navy during World War II
- Nikola Jurišić – nobleman, soldier, and diplomat
- Ivan Karlović – ban of Croatia
- Petar Keglević – ban of Croatia and Slavonia
- Vinko Knežević – nobleman and General in the Habsburg Austria Army
- Vladimir Kren – Major General and Commander of the Air Force during World War II
- Petar Krešimir IV of Croatia – medieval king and military leader
- Petar Kružić – heroic defender of Klis against the Turks
- Grgo Kusić – tallest Croat ever, tallest soldier of Austro-Hungarian Army
- Slavko Kvaternik – Minister of Armed Forces during World War II
- Ivan Lenković – Army general and the leader of the Uskoks
- Mladen Lorković – Foreign Minister and Minister of Interior during World War II
- Richard Marcinko - U.S. Navy SEAL commander, Vietnam War veteran and first commanding officer of SEAL Team Six
- Marko Mesić – priest and war hero from the Ottoman Wars
- Vladimir Metikoš – General during World War II
- Vladimir Majder – Croatian partisan and Spanish Civil War veteran
- Miroslav Navratil – fighter pilot during WWI, General during WWII
- Michael J. Novosel – hero of the Vietnam War
- Rüstem Pasha Opuković – Grand Vizier of the Ottoman Empire
- Piyale Pasha – Ottoman Grand Admiral and Vizier
- Peter Vitus von Quosdanovich - Nobleman and General of the Habsburg monarchy
- Lothar Rendulic – Austrian Colonel General during World War II
- Mathias Rukavina von Boynograd – General in the Austro-Hungarian Army
- Stjepan Sarkotić – General in the Austro-Hungarian Army
- Arsen Sečujac – General in the Habsburg Austria Army
- Tomislav Sertić – General during World War II
- Ivan L. Slavich, Jr. – United States Army colonel, military pioneer, served in World War II, the Korean War, and the Vietnam War
- Andrijica Šimić – hajduk
- Tom Starcevich – Australian recipient of the Victoria Cross during WWII
- Ivan Tomašević – soldier and World War II General
- Tomislav – first Croatian king
- Peter Tomich (Petar Tomić) – U.S. Army and U.S. Navy
- Mijat Tomić – hajduk
- Baron Franjo Trenk – leader of Pandurs; father of military music
- Franjo Vlašić – General and Ban
- Josef Philipp Vukassovich – Habsburg commander
- Matija Zmajević – Admiral of the Baltic fleet
- Petar Zrinski – Croatian ban and conspirator
- Nikola Šubić Zrinski – Croatian ban, hero of the Battle of Szigetvár
- Nikola VII Zrinski – Croatian ban, warrior and poet

=== Croatian War of Independence (1991–1995) ===
- Janko Bobetko – general
- Davor Domazet-Lošo – admiral
- Željko Glasnović – general
- Ante Gotovina – general
- Josip Jović – Croatian policeman, first victim in Independence War
- Mladen Markač – general
- Rudolf Perešin – fighter pilot
- Slobodan Praljak – general
- Petar Stipetić – general
- Blago Zadro – general (Siege of Vukovar)

== Politics ==
- Mehmed Alajbegović – Foreign Minister and Minister of Welfare during World War II
- Josip Broz Tito – ruler of Yugoslavia from 1945 to 1980
- Dražen Budiša – politician
- Ivana Dulić-Marković – Serbian politician; vice-president of G17 Plus; former Deputy Prime Minister of Serbia and once Minister of Agriculture, Forestry and Water Management
- Josip Frank – Croatian politician
- Andrija Hebrang – Croatian communist party leader
- Većeslav Holjevac – a president of SR Croatia in Yugoslavia and a long-time mayor of its capital Zagreb
- Josip Jelačić – soldier, former Croatian ban
- Osman Kulenović – Deputy Prime Minister NDH
- Džafer-beg Kulenović – politician in NDH
- Vladko Maček – political centrist, leader of the Croatian Peasant Party before the establishment of the Independent State of Croatia
- Nikola Mandić – Prime Minister during World War II
- Ante Marković – former Yugoslav prime minister
- Stipe Mesić – President of the Republic of Croatia
- Dr. Ante Pavelić (older) – vice-president of the National assembly of the State of Slovenes, Croats and Serbs
- Ante Pavelić – Ustaša leader
- Andrej Plenković – prime minister
- Stjepan Radić – Croatian national leader in 1st half of 20th century
- Ante Starčević – "father of Croat nation"
- Milan Šufflay – historian
- Ante Trumbić – Croatian national leader
- Franjo Tuđman – first President of Croatia, founder of modern Croatia

=== Foreign figures of Croatian descent ===
People of Croatian ancestry who are high-ranked officials of other countries:

- Mark Begich – US Senator from Alaska
- James Belich – former Mayor of Wellington, New Zealand
- Cesar Bielich-Pomareda – Minister of the Navy of Peru
- Michael Bilandic – former Mayor of Chicago; former Illinois State Supreme Court Chief Justice
- Gabriel Boric – President of Chile
- Natasha Stott Despoja – Australian Democrat Senator
- Ivan Gašparovič – President of Slovakia (Croatian father)
- Cedomil Lausic Glasinovic – Chilean MIR activist
- Alejandro Jadresic – Chilean Energy Minister, engineer, economist
- John Kasich – Governor of Ohio
- Néstor Kirchner - former President of Argentina
- Dennis Kucinich – US Representative from Ohio; former Mayor of Cleveland
- Frank Mahovlich – Canadian Senator (NHL Hall of Famer)
- Mary Matalin – US political consultant
- Josip Marohnić – founding father of Croatian Fraternal Union
- Javier Milei – President of Argentina
- John Newman – Australian politician
- Roy Nikisch – Governor of Chaco, Argentina
- Francisco Orlić Bolmarčić – former President of Costa Rica, Croat parents
- Rudy Perpich – former Governor of Minnesota
- Baldo Prokurica – former Congressman, current Senator in Chile
- Edmundo Pérez Zujovic – Chilean PDC, Minister of Finance, Interior and of Public Works
- George Radanovich – US Representative from California
- Anisha Rosnah - Princess of the royal family of Brunei
- Clem Simich – Member of NZ Parliament
- Jorge Sobisch – Governor of Neuquén, Argentina
- Leonor Oyarzún Ivanovic – former Chilean First Lady
- Néstor Carlos Kirchner Ostoić – former president of Argentina
- Eric Skrmetta – US politician
- Vincent Thomas – US politician
- Michael Anthony Stepovich – former Governor of Alaska
- Radomiro Tomic – former Chilean Deputy, Senator and Ambassador
- Lynne Yelich – Member of Canadian Parliament

== Religion ==
- Ivan Ančić – theological writer
- Josip Bozanić – cardinal
- Markantun de Dominis – archbishop
- Matija Vlačić Ilirik – Protestant reformer
- Andrija Jamometić - Dominican
- Juraj Habdelić – Jesuit and writer
- Luka Ibrišimović – friar, leader of an uprising against Ottoman forces in Slavonia
- Estanislao Esteban Karlic – Cardinal of Argentina
- Bartol Kašić – Jesuit and grammarian during the Counter-Reformation
- Baltazar Adam Krčelić – historian, theologian and lawyer
- Marko Krizin (Marko Križevčanin) – saint
- Antun Mahnić – bishop
- Leopold Mandić – saint
- Ivan Merz – beatified
- Gregory of Nin – bishop
- Franciscus Patricius – philosopher and scientist
- Marija Petković – beatified nun
- Ivo Protulipac – layman
- Vinko Puljić – Cardinal Priest of the Roman Catholic Church in Sarajevo
- John of Ragusa – Cardinal
- Franjo Šeper – Cardinal and Prefect of the Congregation for the Doctrine of the Faith
- Alojzije Stepinac – archbishop, beatified
- Zlatko Sudac – stigmatic
- Nikola Tavelić – saint
- Miroslav Volf – Christian theologian
- Bernard Zamanja – theologist

== Heroism ==
- Paul Bucha, Vietnam War veteran
- Vesna Bosanac, physician, Siege of Vukovar hero
- Fran Krsto Frankopan, nobleman
- Siniša Glavašević, journalist, Siege of Vukovar hero
- Diva Grabovčeva, virgin martyr
- Nikola Jurišić, nobleman, soldier
- St. Marko Križevčanin, missionary, martyr
- Eugen Kvaternik, leader of Rakovica Revolt
- Michael J. Novosel, WWII, Korean and Vietnam War veteran
- Nikola Šubić Zrinski, nobleman, general
- Rudolf Perešin, fighter pilot, Croatian War of independence hero
- Petar Perica, Catholic priest, martyr
- St. Nikola Tavelić, Franciscan, martyr
- Mijat Tomić, hajduk
- John J. Tominac, WWII hero
- Ivan Vranetić
- Blago Zadro, Croatian War of independence hero

== Urban legends ==
- Jure Grando – first real person described as a vampire in historical records

== Sport ==
- John Abramovic (1919–2000) – former basketball player, played in the Basketball Association of America for Pittsburgh Ironmen, St. Louis Bombers, Baltimore Bullets and Syracuse Nationals
- Mirko Alilović (born 1985) – handball goalkeeper
- Mario Ančić (born 1984) – tennis; Davis Cup Champion
- Johnny Babich (1913–2001) – former baseball player, played in Major League Baseball for Brooklyn Dodgers, Boston Bees, and Philadelphia Athletics
- Dalibor Bagarić (born 1980) – former NBA player
- Ivano Balić (born 1979) – handball player, IHF player of the year 2003, 2006
- Zvonko Bego (1940–2018) – football player
- Željko Bilecki (1950–2023) – football player
- Bill Belichick (born 1952) – NFL Coach
- Brian Billick (born 1954) – NFL coach
- Gary Beban (born 1946) – former NFL player
- Dragan Bender (born 1997) – basketball player in the Israeli Basketball Premier League
- Pete Bercich (born 1971) – former NFL player
- Dražen Besek (born 1963) – football coach and former player
- Sandra Bezic (born 1956) – figure skater, choreographer and television commentator
- Val Bezic (born 1952) – figure skater
- Slaven Bilić (born 1968) – former football player, former manager of Croatian national football team and former manager of West Ham United in the Premier League
- Dražen Biškup (born 1965) – football coach and former player
- Djurdjica Bjedov (born 1947) – swimmer
- Zlatko Dalić (born 1966) – former football player, current manager of Croatian national football team
- Zlatan Ibrahimović (born 1981) – football player
- Antonio Blasevich (1902–1976) – football player and coach
- Goran Blažević (born 1986) – football goalkeeper
- Miroslav Blažević (1935–2023) – football Manager
- Zvonimir Boban (born 1968) – football player
- Bojan Bogdanović (born 1989) – basketball player in NBA
- Andrew Bogut (born 1984) – NBA basketball player
- Alen Bokšić (born 1970) – football player
- Tamara Boroš (born 1977) – table tennis champion
- Mark Bosnich (born 1972) – football goalkeeper, Premier League
- Mark Bresciano (born 1980) – football player (Italian father, Croat mother)
- Reid Brignac (born 1986) – baseball player
- Denis Buntić (born 1982) – handball player
- Nick Burley (1875–1911) – boxer
- Tony Butkovich (1921–1945) – American football player, All-American
- Pete Carroll (born 1951) – NFL head coach and executive vice president
- Joseph Cattarinich (1881–1938) – NHL Hall of Famer
- Macklin Celebrini - NHL player
- George Chuvalo (born 1937) – heavyweight boxer
- Branko Cikatić (1955–2020) – First K-1 Grand Prix Winner (kickboxing)
- Marin Čilić (born 1988) – No. 1 Junior in the World (tennis) and US Open champion
- Ann Cindric (1922–2010) – baseball player
- Vedran Ćorluka (born 1986)– football player
- Krešimir Ćosić (1948–1995) – member of the basketball Hall of Famer
- Fred Couples (born 1959) – golfer (former World number 1)
- Helen Crlenkovich (1921–1955) – athlete
- Dario Cvitanich (born 1984) – football player, Ajax
- Ivona Dadic (born 1993) – Austrian track and field athlete
- Nick Dasovic (born 1968) – football player and coach
- Paul Diamond (born 1961) – professional wrestler, soccer player
- David Diehl (born 1980) – NFL player
- Nicholas Drazenovic (born 1987) – ice hockey player
- Stipe Drews (born 1973) – boxing champion
- Domagoj Duvnjak (born 1988) – handball player
- Marina Erakovic (born 1988) – tennis player, New Zealand
- Abby Erceg (born 1989) – football player, New Zealand
- Eddie Erdelatz (1913–1966) – American football player
- Elvis Fatović (born 1971) – former water polo player and coach, European and World medalist
- Mirko Filipović (born 1974, Cop) – mixed martial artist and kickboxer; K-1
- Jonathan Filewich (born 1984) – ice hockey player
- Mark Fistric (born 1986) – ice hockey player
- Dražen Funtak (born 1975) – sprint canoer
- Gary Gabelich (1940–1984) – American automobile-racing driver
- Ray Gabelich (1933–2000) – Australian Rules footballer
- Gabre Gabric (1914–2015) – track and field athlete
- Gino Gardassanich (1922–2010) – football player
- Gordan Giriček (born 1977) – former NBA player
- Mike Golic (born 1962) – co-host of ESPN Radio's Mike and Mike in the Morning; former NFL player
- Kara Goucher (born 1978) – long-distance runner
- Elvis Grbac (born 1970) – NFL player
- Great Antonio (1925–2003) – strongman
- Visco Grgich (1923–2005) – former NFL player
- Bobby Grich (born 1949) – former MLB player
- Tom Haller (1937–2004) – MLB baseball player
- Justin Hamilton (born 1990) – basketball player
- Travis Hamonic (born 1990) – ice hockey player
- John Havlicek (1940–2019) – basketball player
- John Hecimovic (born 1984) – ice hockey player
- Frankie Hejduk (born 1974) – football player, MLS
- Mario Hezonja (born 1995) – basketball player, NBA
- Zvonimir Boban (born 1968) – football player
- Robert Jarni (born 1968) – football player
- Saša Hiršzon (born 1972) – tennis player
- Ico Hitrec (1911–1946) – football player
- Hrvoje Horvat (born 1946) – handball player
- Les Horvath (1921–1995) – former NFL player
- Tony Hrkac (born 1966) – ice hockey player
- Dick Hrstich (1920–2000) – New Zealand wrestler
- Goran Ivanišević (born 1971) – tennis player; Wimbledon Champion; two Olympic bronze medals, 1992
- Andreas Ivanschitz (born 1983) – football player
- Robert Jarni (born 1968) – former football player
- Nikica Jelavić (born 1985) – former football player
- Ana Jelušić (born 1986) – skier
- Dražan Jerković (1936–2008) – football player (top scorer WC 1962 and EURO 1960)
- Ed Jurak (born 1957) – baseball player
- Al Jurisich (1921–1981) – baseball player
- Igor Jurković (born 1985) – kickboxer
- John Jurkovic (born 1967) – NFL player
- Tvrtko Kale (born 1974) – football player, goalkeeper (Hapoel Haifa)
- Ivo Karlović (born 1979) – tennis player
- Mario Kasun (born 1980) – former NBA player, Orlando Magic
- Jason Kelce (born 1987) - American football player
- Travis Kelce (born 1989) - American football player
- Siniša Kelečević (born 1970) – basketball player
- Ivan Klasnić (born 1980) – former football player
- Marko Kopljar (born 1986) – handball player
- Ante Kostelić (born 1938) – Alpine skiing coach
- Ivica Kostelić (born 1979) – Alpine Skiing Slalom World Cup Champion (three Olympic silvers)
- Janica Kostelić (born 1982) – A.S. World Cup Champion in 2001, 2003 & 2006 (four Olympic golds, two silvers)
- Dan Kordic (born 1971) – ice hockey player
- John Kordic (1965–1992) – ice hockey player
- Robert Kovač (born 1974) – football player
- Niko Kovač (born 1971) –former football player current manager of Wfl Wolfsburg
- Mario Kovačević (born 1975) – football coach and former player
- Niko Kranjčar (born 1984) – former football player
- Mike Kreevich (1908–1994) – baseball player
- Toni Kukoč (born 1968) – NBA player (NBA Sixth Man of the Year 1995–96)
- Blaženko Lacković (born 1980) – handball player
- Dražen Ladić (born 1963) – former football goalkeeper
- Stefan Leko (born 1974) – kickboxer
- Curt Leskanic (born 1968) – former MLB pitcher
- Matija Ljubek (1953–2000) – kayaker
- Ivan Ljubičić (born 1979) – former tennis player; Davis Cup Champion (#3)
- Johnny Logan (1926–2013) – baseball player
- Mickey Lolich (1940–2026) – baseball player
- Venio Losert (born 1976) – handball goalkeeper
- Steve Lubratich (born 1955) – baseball player
- Dan Luger (born 1975) – rugby union player
- Frank Mahovlich (born 1938) – NHL Hall of Famer (1958 Calder Trophy winner)
- Pete Mahovlich (born 1946) – NHL player
- Iva Majoli (born 1977) – Roland Garros Champion
- Tony Mandarich (born 1966) – American football player
- John Mandic (1919–2003) – NBA player
- Mario Mandžukić (born 1986) – former football player
- Todd Marinovich (born 1969) – former NFL player
- Marv Marinovich (1939–2020) – former NFL player
- Vic Markov (1915–1998) – American football player
- Roger Maris (1934–1985) – baseball player, MLB
- Željko Mavrović (born 1969) – former European boxing champion
- John Mayasich (born 1933) – former hockey player
- Catfish Metkovich (1920–1995) – baseball player
- Petar Metličić (born 1976) – handball player
- Siniša Mihajlović (1969–2022) – (mother's side family) football player
- Marcello Mihalich (1907–1996) – football player
- George Mikan (1924–2005, Mr. Basketball) – NBA (Basketball Hall of Fame)
- Pat Miletich (born 1968) – UFC mixed martial artist
- Stipe Miocic (born 1982) – UFC mixed martial artist
- Luka Modrić (born 1985) – football player, plays for Real Madrid C.F.
- Nika Mühl (born 2001) – basketball player, plays for Seattle Storm
- Sofía Mulánovich (born 1983) – surfer
- Dražen Mužinić (born 1953) – football player
- Zdravko Miljak (born 1950) – handball player
- Rob Ninkovich (born 1984) – American football player
- Frank Nobilo (born 1960) – NZ golfer
- Mirjana Ognjenović (born 1953) – former Yugoslav/Croatian handball player
- Phil Oreskovic (born 1987) – ice hockey player
- Victor Oreskovich (born 1986) – ice hockey player
- Erv Palica (1928–1982) – former MLB pitcher
- Mate Parlov (1948–2008) – boxing champion
- Mark Pavelich (1958–2021) – ice hockey, NHL
- Marty Pavelich (1927–2024) – ice hockey, NHL
- Matt Pavelich (1934–2026) – ice hockey, NHL official
- Snježana Pejčić (born 1982) – shooting player
- Sandra Perković (born 1990) – discus thrower
- Nikolaj Pešalov (born 1970) – Olympic gold medal winner in weightlifting
- Johnny Pesky (1919–2012) – baseball player, manager and coach
- Dražen Petrović (1964–1993) – NBA Hall of Famer
- Zoran Planinić (born 1982) – former NBA player
- Dan Plesac (born 1962) – former MLB pitcher
- Diana Prazak (born 1979) – professional boxer
- Robert Prosinečki (born 1969) – football player
- Joel Prpic (born 1974) – ice hockey player
- Dado Pršo (born 1974) – football player
- Braslav Rabar (1919–1973) – chess player
- Dino Rađa (born 1967) – former NBA star
- Paul Radisich (born 1962) – racing driver
- Nikola Radulović (born 1973) – basketball player
- Ivan Rakitić (born 1988) – footballer, plays for FC Barcelona
- Ante Razov (born 1974) – football player
- Jules Rykovich (1923–1974) – former NFL player
- Borna Rendulić (born 1992) – NHL player
- Vedran Runje (born 1976) – former football goalkeeper
- Lou Saban (1921–2009) – NFL coach
- Nick Saban (born 1951) – college football coach
- Spider Sabich (1945–1976) – alpine skier
- Vladimir Sabich (1945–1976) – American skier murdered by girlfriend Claudine Longet
- Brian Sakic (born 1971) – NHL player
- Joe Sakic (born 1969) – NHL player (2001 Hart Memorial Trophy Winner)
- Dario Šarić (born 1994, Super Dario) – NBA player with the Philadelphia 76ers
- Cory Sarich (born 1978) – ice hockey player
- Buzz Schneider (born 1954) – ice hockey player
- Branko Šegota (born 1961) – football player
- Frank Sinkwich (1920–1990) – American football player and awarded the Heisman Trophy
- Elvis Sinosic (born 1971) (King of Rock N Rumble) – mixed martial artist, UFC
- Paul Skansi (born 1961) – American football player
- Nick Skorich (1921–2004) – American football player and coach
- Matt Skrmetta (born 1972) – baseball player
- Paul Spoljaric (born 1970) – baseball player
- Josef Spudich (1908–2001) – American football player
- Darijo Srna (born 1982) – football player
- Max Starcevich (1911–1990) – All-American football guard
- Steve Stipanovich (born 1960) – former NBA player, No.2 pick in 1983 NBA Draft
- Dominik Straga (born 1988) – swimmer
- Dario Šimić (born 1975) – football player
- Davor Šuker (born 1968) – football player (best scorer of the 1998 WC most goals winner of golden shoe in 98 WC with six goals)
- Bruno Šundov (born 1980) – former NBA player
- Žan Tabak (born 1970) – former NBA player
- Marko Tomas (born 1985) – basketball player
- Igor Miličić (born 1976) – former basketball player
- Igor Miličić Jr. (born 2002) – basketball player
- Rudy Tomjanovich (born 1948) – former NBA player and coach
- Andy Tonkovich (1922–2006) – first NBA pick in 1948
- Igor Tudor (born 1978) – football player
- The Great Antonio (1925–2003) – strongman and eccentric
- Roko Ukić (born 1984) – NBA player
- Auggie Vidovich (born 1981) – NASCAR driver
- Mark Viduka (born 1975) – football player, Premier League
- Blanka Vlašić (born 1983) – high jumper
- Marc-Édouard Vlasic (born 1987) – ice hockey player
- Antonio Vojak (1904–1975) – football player
- Oliviero Vojak (1911–1932) – football player
- Nikolai Volkoff (1947–2018) – WWE Hall of Famer, born Josip Peruzović
- Danny Vranes (born 1958) – basketball player
- Stojko Vranković (born 1964) – former NBA player
- Nikola Vujčić (born 1978) – basketball player and team manager of Maccabi Tel Aviv
- Bernard Vukas (1927–1983) – football player
- Vladimir Vuković (1898–1975) – chess player
- Božo Vuletić (born 1958) – Olympic water polo gold medalist
- Wesna (born 1983) – professional wrestler
- Slaven Zambata (1940–2020) – football player
- Fritzie Zivic (The Croat Comet) (1913–1984) – former World Welterweight Champion
- Chris Zorich (born 1969) – former NFL player
- Zdravko Zovko (born 1955) – handball player
- Bob Zupcic (born 1966) – baseball player
- Ante Žižić (born 1997) – basketball player in the Israeli Basketball Premier League
- Mario Andretti (born 1940) – racing driver, born in Motovun

== See also ==
- List of Croatian artists
- List of Istrians
- Croats
- Croatian diaspora
- Croatian American
- Croats in Argentina
- Croatians in Austria
- Croatian Australian
- Croats of Belgium
- Croats of Bosnia and Herzegovina
- Croatian Brazilian
- Croatian Canadian
- Croatian Chilean
- Croats in the Czech Republic
- Croatians in Germany
- Croats in Hungary
- Croats of Italy
- Croatia–Mexico relations
- Croats of Montenegro
- Croats in New Zealand
- Croatian Peruvian
- Croats of Romania
- Croats of Serbia
- Croats in Slovakia
- Croats of Slovenia
- Croats of Sweden
- Croats of Switzerland
- Croats in Uruguay
- List of Croatian sportspeople
- Croatian literature (includes a list of Croats in literature)
- List of rulers of Croatia
