= Croatian Peruvians =

Peruvian people of Croatian descent

(Croatia) Croatian Peruvians (Peru)
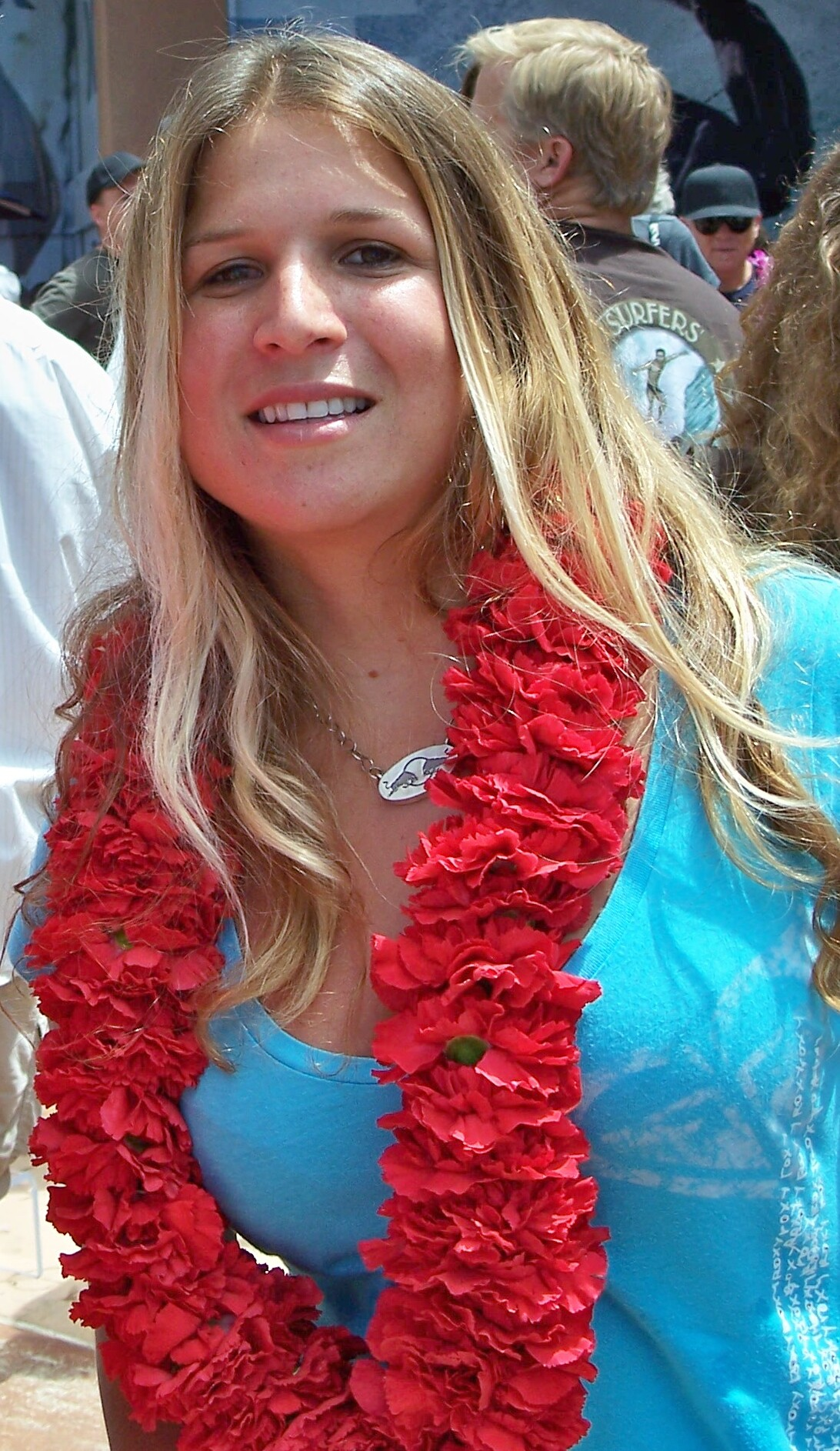
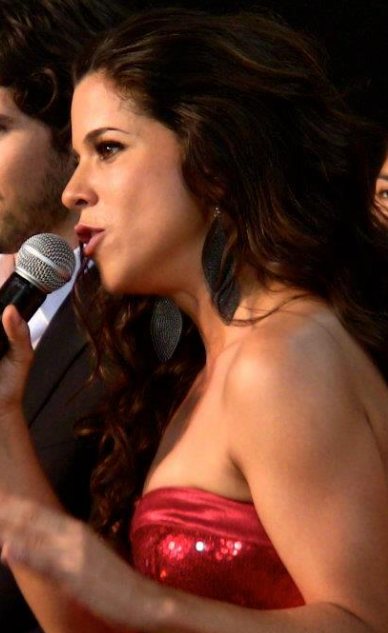
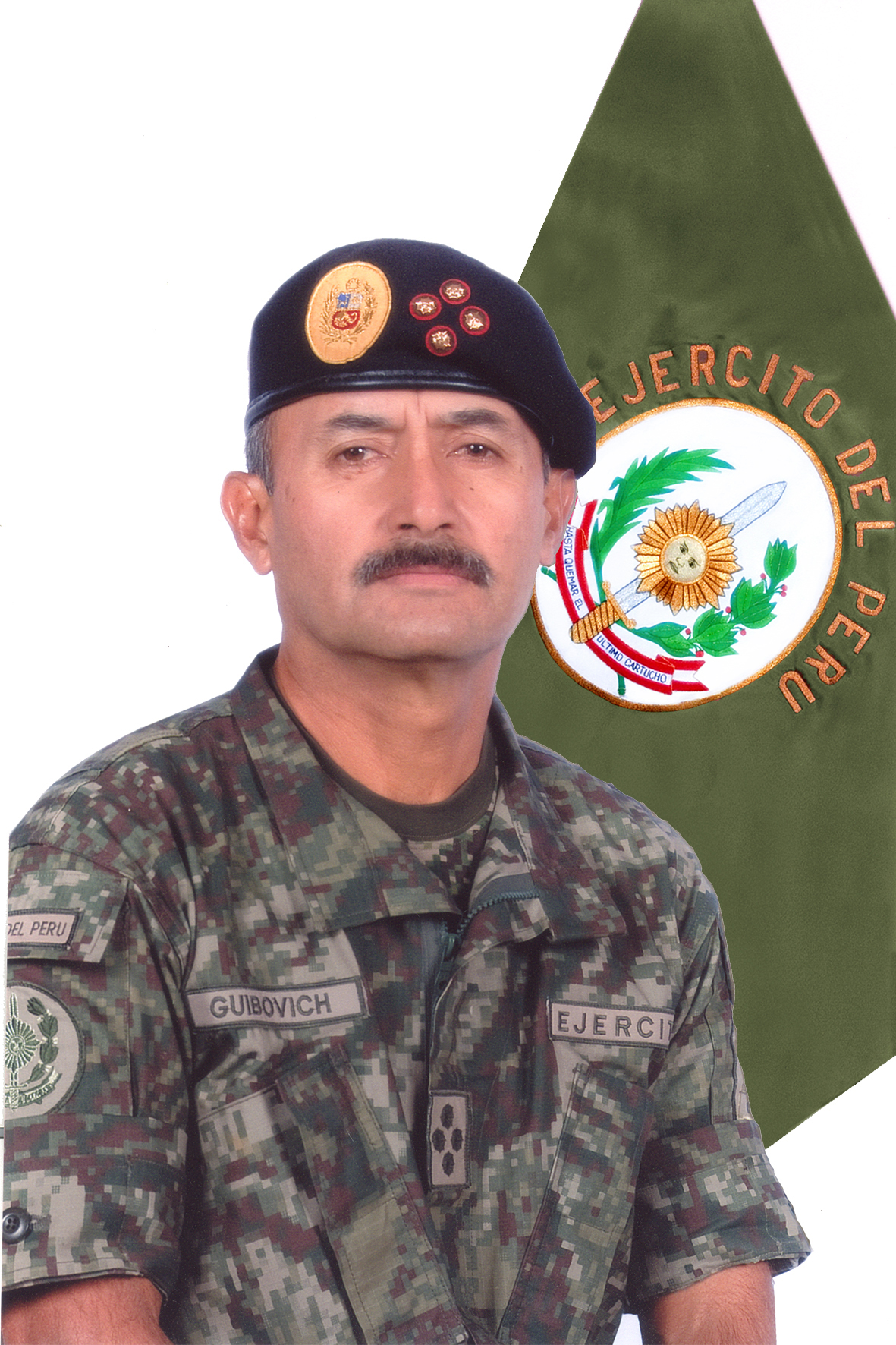
- Notable Croatian Peruvians; Sofía Mulánovich; Vanessa Terkes; Otto Guibovich; Juan Bielovucic

Total population
- 190,000 - 250,000

Regions with significant populations
- Callao, Lima, Arequipa, Cerro de Pasco, Ancash, Cajamarca, Iquitos

Languages
- Spanish, Croatian

Religion
- Roman Catholic

Croatian Peruvians (Croatian: Peruanski Hrvati) are Peruvians of Croatian descent. Mostly settled in the Peruvian capital, Lima, Croatian Peruvians have scattered throughout the vast metropolis, but are known to have established a strong community in the Miraflores District, where strong ties to the ethnic group still remain. Due to intermarriage, most Croatian Peruvians are of mixed ancestry. Actual conversations in Croatian are common only within first generation immigrants. Although Croatian speech in Peru has been generally lost.

Most Croatian Peruvians are Roman Catholic and either completely Croat or of mixed European origin.

It is estimated that there are between 200.000 to 250.000 Croatian Peruvians (with Croatian ancestor).

== History ==
Peru was the first South American country to receive immigrants from Croatia. Early settlers came from the Republic of Ragusa (modern-day Dubrovnik) in the 16th century. A more significant number of immigrants arrived in the second half of the 19th century and the early 20th century, mostly from the Dubrovnik area and the rest of the Croatian Adriatic coast. Some Croats were involved in the guano business that was flourishing in the late 19th century; others pursued copper, gold and silver mining in the Andes. By the end of the 19th century, Croats were the most prominent foreign community in the mining town of Cerro de Pasco.

A group of approximately 1,000 political emigrants from Croatia arrived in the country in 1948. The new generation of immigrants differed significantly from the old one, and the two populations remained separate for a long time.

Mons. Drago Balvanović (1936-2026), then priest of the Diocese of Banja Luka, came to Lima in the summer of 1987, to serve Croatian community; since 1988, he was parish priest of the St. Leopold Mandić Parish in Lima, where he built parish church dedicated to Leopold Mandić. Since 1997, he was diocesan vicar for the Croats of Peru, and since 2003 delegate of South-American Croats for Croatian Episcopal Conference (HBK) and Episcopal Conference of Bosnia and Herzegovina (BKBiH). He was buried in St. Leopold Mandić's church in Lima.

== Notable people ==
- Cesar Bielich-Pomareda, former Minister of the Navy of Peru
- Ismael Bielich-Flores, politician
- Juan Bielovucic, aviator
- Ivan Bulos, footballer
- Marko Ciurlizza, footballer
- Juan Gargurevich, journalist and university professor
- Otto Guibovich, former General Commander of the Peruvian Army and politician
- Saby Kamalich, actress
- Kristian Kreković, painter
- Baldo Kresalja, former Minister of Justice and Human Rights and university professor
- Sofía Mulánovich, surfer
- Esteban Pavletich, novelist and essayist
- Raul Ruidíaz, footballer
- Juan Sheput, politician
- Renzo Sheput, footballer
- Oliver Sonne, footballer
- Laura Spoya, TV host and Miss Peru 2015
- Vanessa Terkes, actress
- Guillermo Tomasevich, footballer
- Jhovan Tomasevich, rock vocalist from Huelga de Hambre and Zen

== See also ==
- Croatia–Peru relations
- Croats
- List of Croats
- Ethnic groups in Peru
- Peruvians of European descent
