= HLZ =

HLZ may refer to:

- Haldia railway station, in West Bengal, India
- Hamilton Airport (New Zealand)
- Croatian Medical Association (Croatian: Hrvatski liječnički zbor)
- Helicopter Landing Zone, a pre-prepared area of ground for a helicopter to land on.
