= Unity of Command II =

2019 strategy video game

- Developer: 2x2 Games
- Publishers: 2x2 Games; Croteam
- Designer: Tomislav Uzelac
- Platform: Microsoft Windows
- Release: November 12, 2019
- Genre: Turn-based strategy
- Mode: Single-player

Unity of Command II is a turn-based wargame developed by 2x2 Games, and co-produced by Croteam. The game was released on November 12, 2019. It is the sequel to Unity of Command.

== Gameplay ==
Unity of Command II is a tactical turn-based wargame which balances between historical accuracy and abstract game design.

=== Headquarters ===
The game introduces the concept of headquarters, which are used to collect the remnants of player units known as "stragglers". As units get damaged during combat, they dissolve into stragglers, which continue to automatically travel to the player's HQ. Once there, they become part of the player's "Force Pool", which they can use to reinforce their existing units. The functionality of headquarters was expanded to include repairing or constructing bridges on the map. The function is intended to give structure to the systemic complexity of WWII, but without overwhelming the player with countless systems.

== Development ==
The game was in development since late 2014, but was formally announced in 2019. The most visible change to the game is the transition from 2D to 3D graphics, using a proprietary engine developed specifically for this game. Another requirement would be a 64-bit operating system. Notable gameplay mechanics that were added include fog of war, unit headquarters, supply hubs, airborne ops or the ability to go beyond enemy lines and sabotage their infrastructure.

== Reception ==
Reception

Aggregate score
| Aggregator | Score |
|---|---|
| Metacritic | 88/100 |

Review scores
| Publication | Score |
|---|---|
| GameSpot | 8/10 |
| PC Gamer (US) | 91/100 |

Unity of Command II received "generally favorable reviews" according to review aggregator Metacritic.

Rob Zacny, in a review on Vice, noted how the game departed in so many ways from the original, but remained a "simple joy to play", calling it a "wargame that invites a lot of delightful perfectionist revisiting for a long time to come". Wargamer praised its visuals, maintaining they are "some of the best eye candy to come out of a wargaming company this year" and stating that each mission feels satisfactory due to its intimidating design, ultimately calling it a marked improvement over the original Unity of Command. Luke Plunkett of Kotaku called it the best wargame he played in years, but stated his disappointment in turn limiters, and limited control of some units. Rock, Paper, Shotgun was similarly delighted by the game and its novelties, concluding that "Wargames this canny, attractive, friendly and historically literate come along extremely rarely". PC Gamer noted in its review that new additions such as specialists and HQ upgrades contribute considerably to the campaign's flexibility, stating that there are also moments of historical divergence in the game.

GameSpot criticized both the icons in the game, maintaining they are poorly explained, and the limited tutorial which forces the player to consult outside manuals and sources, nevertheless still praising the game as "one of the finest strategy games in recent times."

PCGamesN included the game in its list of the best strategy games on PC.
