= Dretar =

Dretar is a surname. Notable people with the surname include:

- Davor Dretar (born 1966), Croatian singer, radio personality, and television presenter
- Helena Dretar Karić (born 1979), Croatian para table tennis player
- Tomislav Dretar (born 1945), Croatian, Bosnian, French, and Belgian poet, writer, critic, and politician
