= Lujo Bezeredi =

Croatian-Hungarian sculptor and painter (1898-1979)

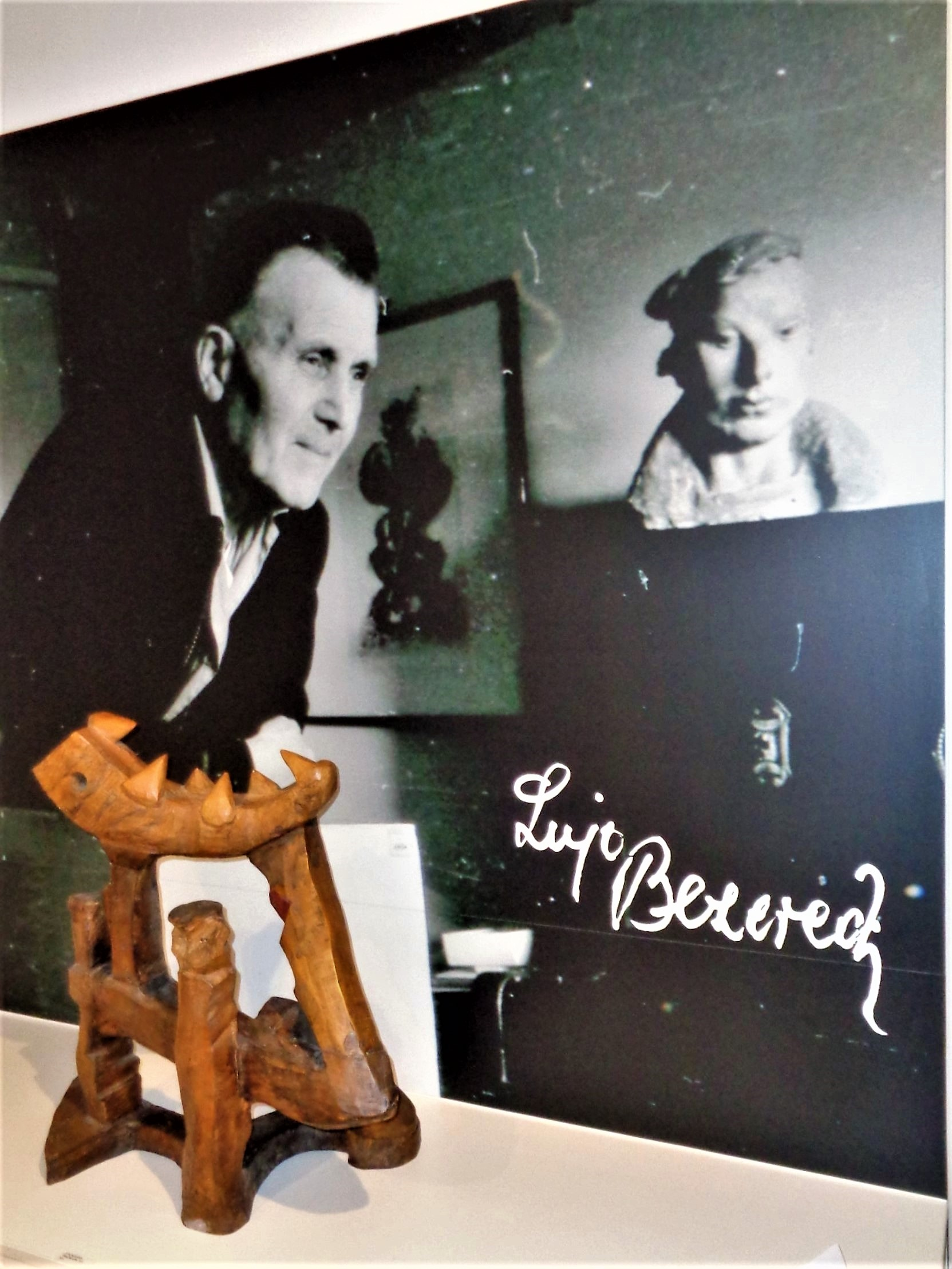
- Portrait of Bezeredi and his signature
- Born: 21 November 1898; Nova, Kingdom of Hungary
- Died: 20 April 1979 (aged 80); Čakovec, Croatia
- Known for: Sculpture, drawing

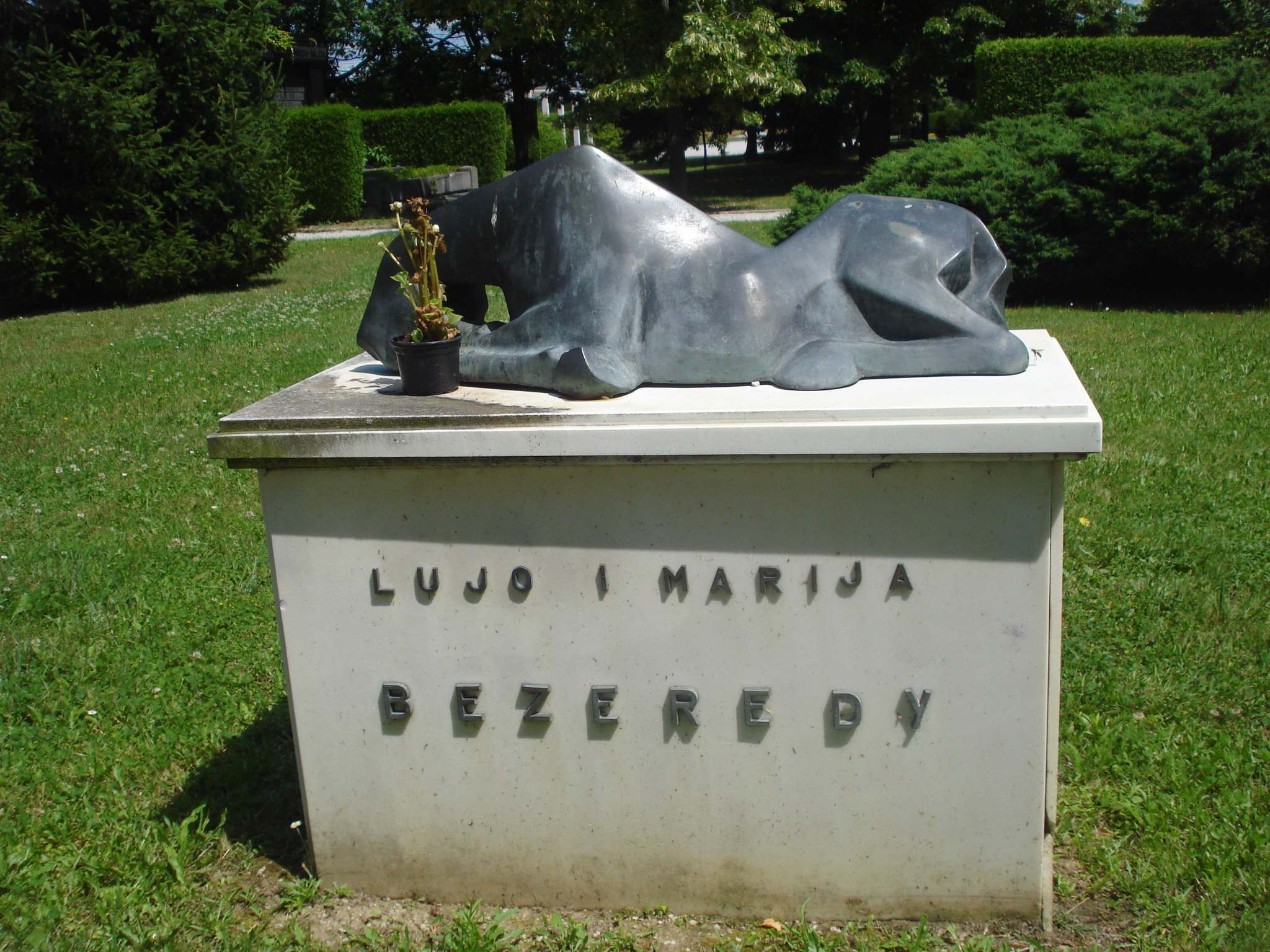
Gravestone of Lujo Bezeredy and his wife Marija at the Čakovec cemetery

Lujo Bezeredi (also spelled Bezeredy, Hungarian: Bezerédi Lajos; 1898 – April 20, 1979) was a Croatian-Hungarian sculptor and painter.

== His life ==
He was born in Nova, Kingdom of Hungary, to a Hungarian-Slovak father and a Croatian mother. After the death of his parents, he moved to Csáktornya (present-day Čakovec, Croatia), where he completed his schooling at the public school and teacher's training school. In 1917 he was drafted to the army. He took part in the establishment of the Serbian–Hungarian Baranya–Baja Republic. After the collapse, he fled to Yugoslavia, but was briefly detained in Osijek. He later studied at the College of Education in Budapest and enrolled in the Academy of Fine Arts in Zagreb in 1922.

He emigrated to Bulgaria. He lived on casual manual jobs, and was finally hired in a brick factory in Plovdiv where he began to make clay in his spare time. In 1922, he returned to Zagreb and enrolled in the sculpture department of the Academy of Fine Arts. His teachers were Rudolf Valdec, Robert Frangeš-Mihanović and Frano Kršinić. Kršinić liked his work, but due to lack of funds, he had to interrupt his studies and made ceramics for sale. During these years he lived in great poverty. In 1927, his exhibition opened in Zagreb.

Between 1936 and 1941 he lived in Belgrade. In 1941, during the German occupation of Belgrade, he fled to Budapest with a group of Hungarians to join the Budapest anti-fascist group connected to the British SIS (Secret Intelligence Service). As a material for sculptures he mostly used terra cotta, with engobe being his favourite pottery technique along with less frequently used faience and glazing techniques. His work is characterized by social motifs from urban and rural life.

In 1942, he returned to Csáktornya, taught drawing, but was dismissed from the school because of his principles. He remained in the city until his death and continued to create. In the beginning, he created figurative, later abstract sculptures. From 1927 to 1969, his works were featured in individual and joint exhibitions in the cities of Croatia, Belgrade and Vienna. In 1968, he was awarded the second grade of the Yugoslav Medal of Merit. In 1969, he received the Vladimir Nazor Award for his life's work.

Bezeredi donated his entire collection of 485 various works of art to the Međimurje County Museum in Čakovec. He is buried at the city cemetery in the same town.

== Gallery ==
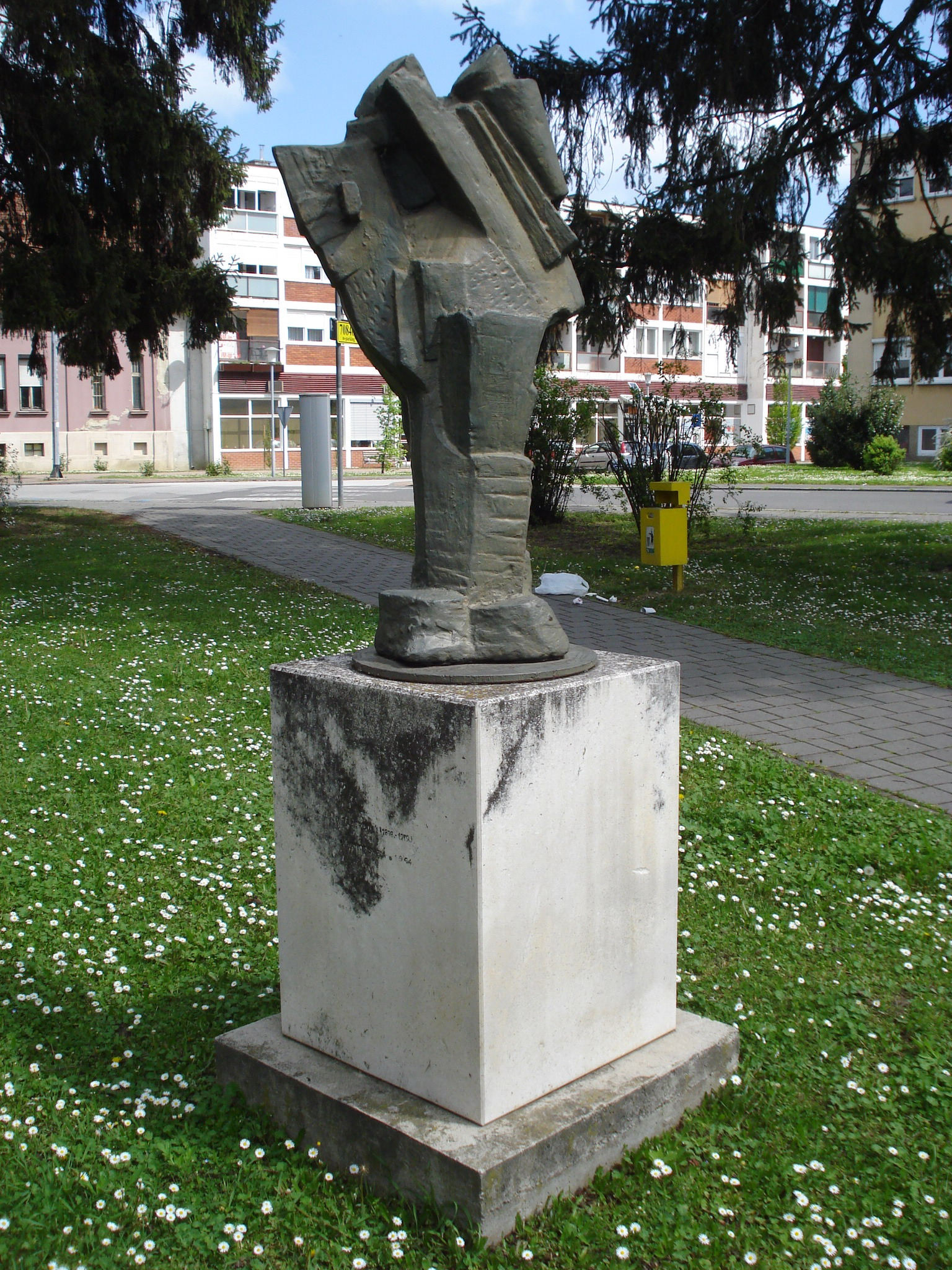

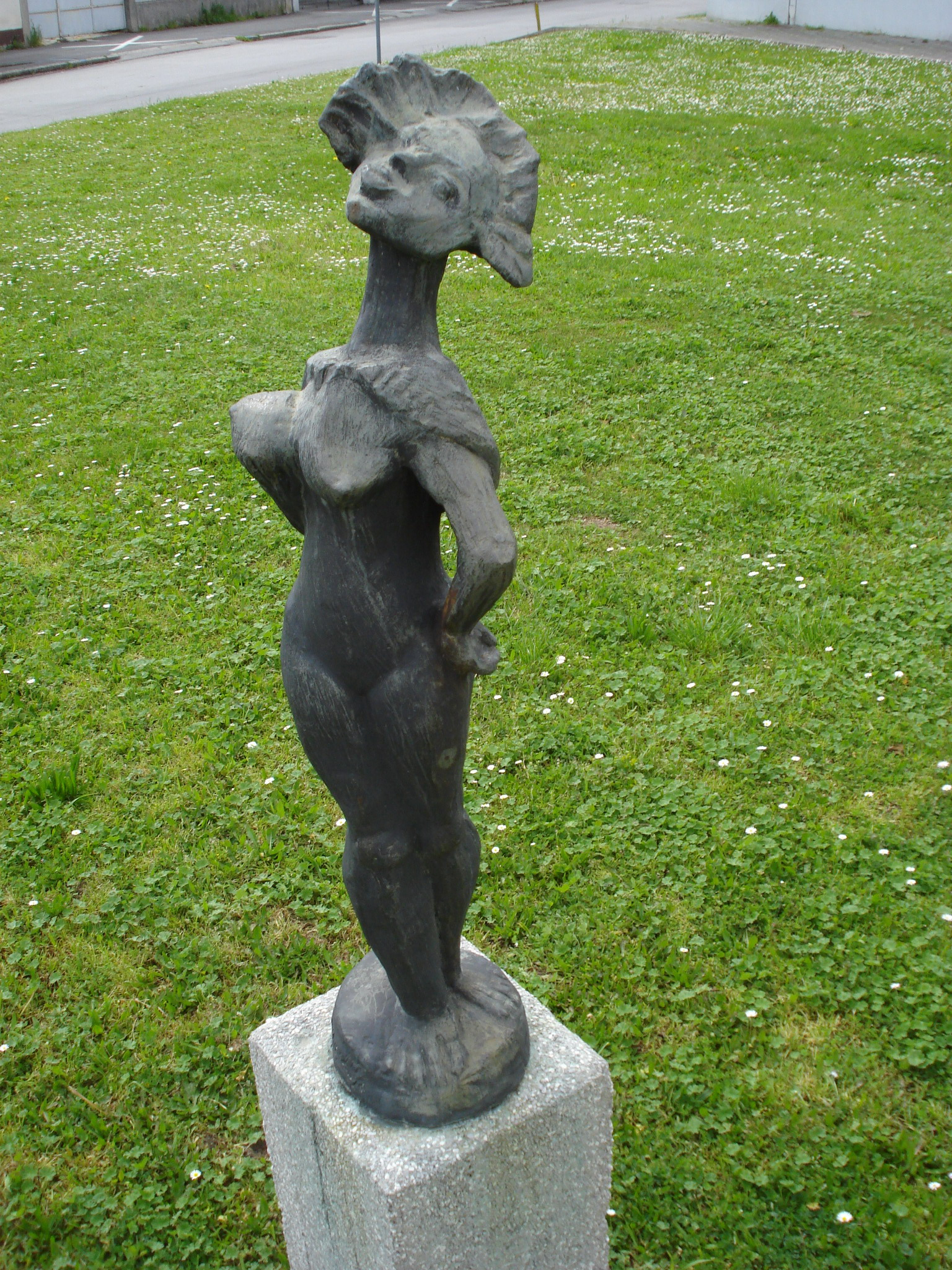

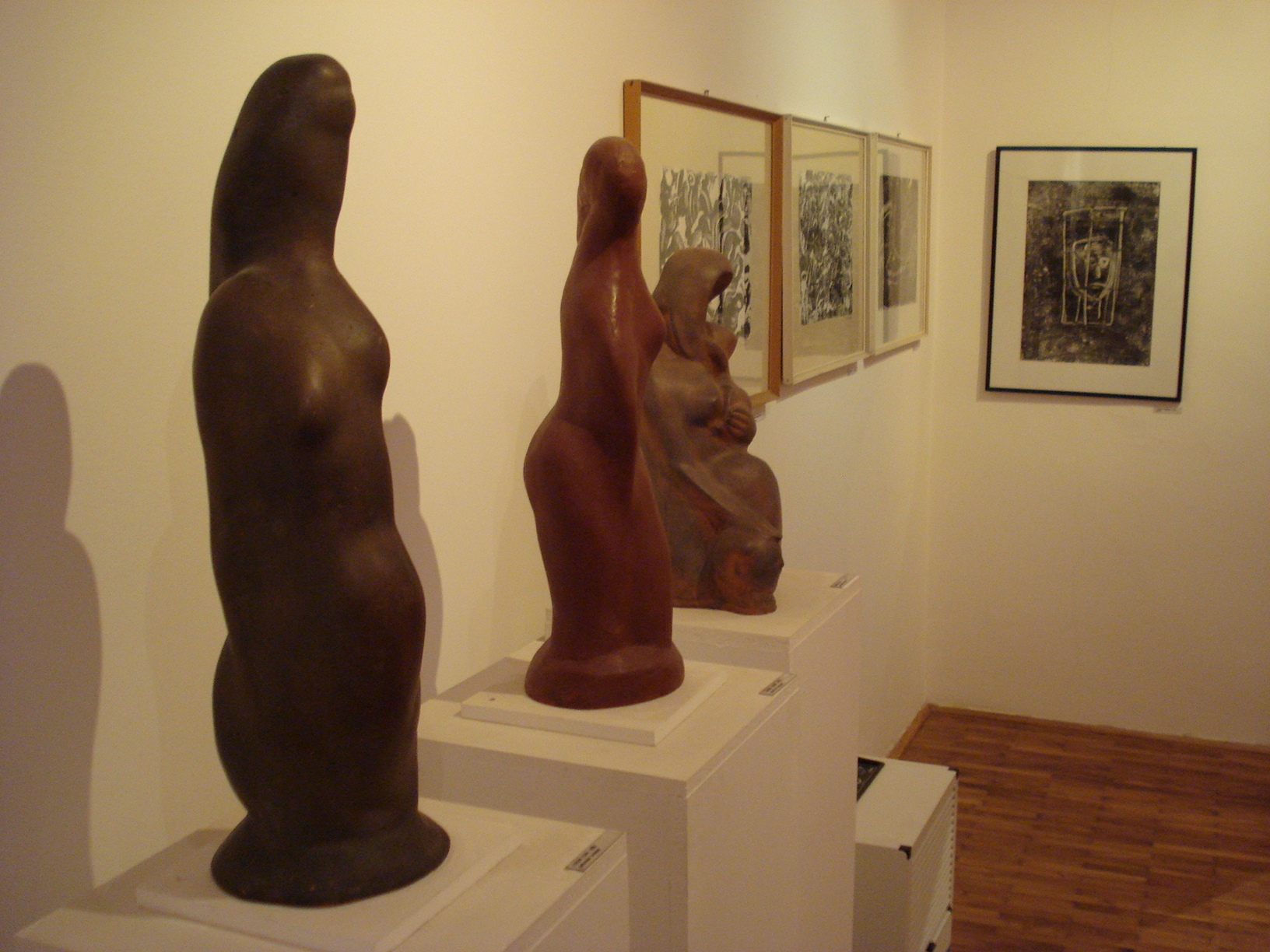

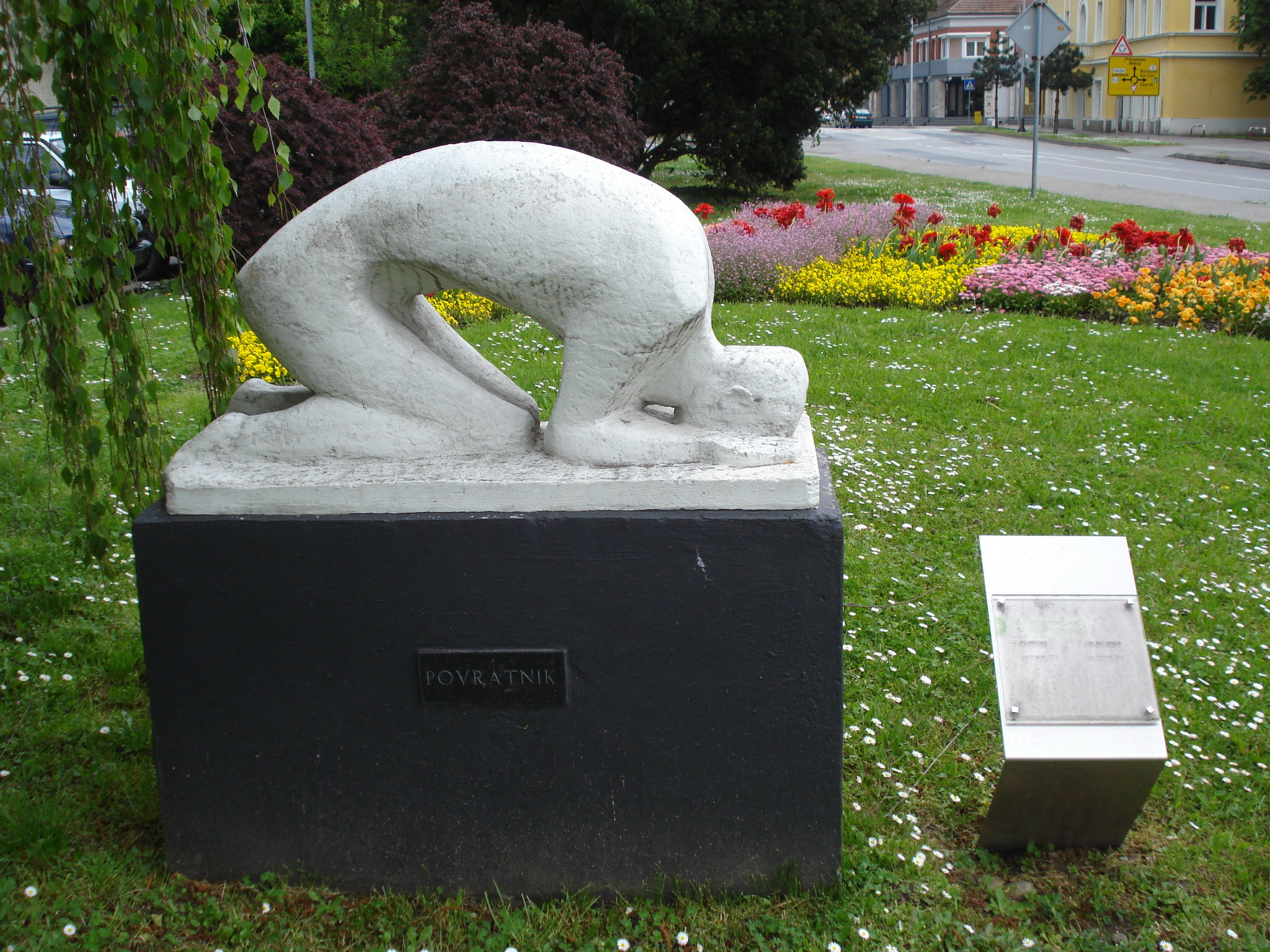
The Returner, a sculpture of Bezeredy in a park in Čakovec
