= Ivo Jajić =

Croatian rheumatologist (1932–2010)

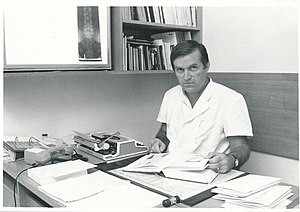
- Professor Ivo Jajić, MD, PhD, 1982
- Born: 2 July 1932; Bristivica, Croatia
- Died: 10 June 2010 (aged 77); Zagreb, Croatia
- Education: University of Zagreb
- Scientific career
- Fields: Rheumatology, Physical medicine and rehabilitation
- Workplaces: School of Medicine, University of Zagreb; Sestre Milosrdnice University Hospital Centre, Zagreb
- Website: www.ivojajic.com

Ivo Jajić (2 July 1932 – 10 June 2010) was a Croatian rheumatologist, university professor and full member of the Croatian Academy of Medical Sciences. He was a pioneer in the development of rheumatology in Croatia, where he significantly advanced the clinical practice, research, and education in the field. Jajić authored over 700 scientific publications and several firsts foundational textbooks in Croatian rheumatology, established and led key national institutions, registries, professional and patient societies, and Croatian medical journals. He was internationally recognized for his contributions to rheumatic disease research and diagnostic imaging, education in rheumatology and application of clinical rheumatology.

== Biography ==
=== Education ===
Jajić graduated from the University of Zagreb School of Medicine in 1960. He specialized in physical medicine and rehabilitation in 1965 and earned his doctorate at the University of Zagreb School of Medicine in 1972 with a topic on extravertebral changes in ankylosing spondylitis. He became the second physician in Croatia with a doctoral degree in rheumatology.

His early clinical work coincided with emerging interest in rheumatic diseases, and due to the lack of organized rheumatology education in Croatia at the time, he undertook advanced clinical and research training at internationally renowned institutions. These included Westminster Hospital, Guy’s Hospital and Middlesex Hospital in London, Hospital Cochin in Paris, Karolinska University Hospital in Stockholm, Institute of Rheumatism in Moscow, as well as hospitals and institutions in Oslo, Budapest, Riga, Warsaw, Vilnius, Prague, Bucharest, Heinola, Piešťany, Manchester, Leeds, and the NIH in Bethesda, Maryland. These international experiences influenced his approach to clinical rheumatology, with an emphasis on interdisciplinary collaboration, immunogenetics of rheumatic diseases, diagnostic imaging, and early intervention.:

=== Academic and Clinical Career ===
Jajić was appointed tenured professor at the University of Zagreb School of Medicine in 1981. In 1988, at the same School he founded and led the Postgraduate Specialist Study in Physical Medicine and Rehabilitation (1988–2001), which featured many rheumatology-focused modules, being instrumental in shaping the study in rheumatology and treatment of rheumatic diseases in Croatia.

In parallel with his academic career, he played a role in expanding rheumatology services within the Croatian healthcare system.

He was founder and head (1985–2001) of the University of Zagreb School of Medicine new teaching base - Department of Rheumatology, Physical Medicine, and Rehabilitation at the Sestre Milosrdnice University Hospital Center in Zagreb, which became a leading national center for clinical practice, education, and research in rheumatology.

In 1999, he established the Croatian Reference Centre for Inflammatory Rheumatic Diseases under the Ministry of Health. This institution served as a national hub for complex rheumatologic cases, interdisciplinary research, and postgraduate training.

Jajić remained active in medical education and international collaboration throughout his life, and became internationally recognized rheumatologist.

He organized numerous international and national rheumatology congresses, including the Ninth Congress of Rheumatologists of Yugoslavia (1984), the First European Conference on Epidemiology of Rheumatic Diseases (1990), the Eighteenth European Osteoarthrology Symposium (1990), the First and Second Hypertrophic Osteoarthropatic Symposium (1992, 1995), Rheumatology Congress of Mediterranean Countries (1992, cancelled due to the Homeland war in Croatia), and Second Croatian Rheumatology Congress (1997). He regularly participated in over 200 international scientific meetings as an invited lecturer and active delegate. He was a member of the organizing committee of several Congresses of Rheumatologists of Mediterranean Countries and Central European Countries.

He also led numerous domestic symposia and educational events, such as the Symposium on Psoriatic Arthritis (1966), Symposium on HLA Antigens in Rheumatology (1981), Symposium on Lumbar Pain Syndrome (1984), New Discoveries in Diagnosis of Rheumatic Diseases (1993), Most Common Rheumatic Diseases (1995), New Discoveries in Treatment of Rheumatic Diseases (1995), and other events addressing rheumatic diseases and war injury rehabilitation.

In 1980, he established the Registry for Rheumatic Diseases in Croatia under the Institute of Public Health.

=== Scientific Achievements and Contributions to International Research ===
Jajić led scientific projects in rheumatology under the Ministry of Health and participated in several international collaborative studies, including:

- EVOS (European Vertebral Osteoporosis Study), 1990–1998
- Characteristics and Epidemiology of Primary Hypertrophic Osteoarthropathy Study, 1991-1996
- EPOS (European Prospective Osteoporosis Study), 1998–2001
- EUROAS (European immunogenetic familial study of ankylosing spondylitis and other spondylarthropathies), 1999-2001

He was also involved in multiple international clinical trials related to disease-modifying antirheumatic drugs (DMARDs) and biologic therapies in rheumatic diseases.

He published original research on clinical tests, including the development of Jajić’s Heel-Knee Test, a diagnostic maneuver used to identify sacroiliitis (1999), a hallmark of spondyloarthropathies. (e.g., Jajić’s Heel-Knee Test), radiological changes, and immunogenetics of rheumatic diseases. He described clinical observations such as the "Blue Skin" Sign (2000) in psoriatic arthritis, "Diastasis of the Rectus Abdominis Muscle" Sign (1999) and „Umbilical extrusion“ Sign (1998) in ankylosing spondylitis.

In 1968, he published radiological changes in the sacroiliac joints and spine in psoriatic arthritis, considered one of the first contributions to this clinical issue, and continues to be cited in the literature. His early radiological research was included in the textbook "Seronegative Polyarthritis" by Wright V. and Moll J.M.H. in 1976.

His immunogenetic research on rheumatic diseases, published in 1975 and 1977, were among the first studies on histocompatibility antigens in ankylosing spondylitis and psoriatic arhritis.

Jajić co-authored an international consensus on hypertrophic osteoarthropathy (1993), and was the first to describe radiological changes in flat bones associated with this condition (1998).

=== Publications ===
Jajić authored over 700 publications, including academic papers with research spanning clinical rheumatology, immunogenetics, diagnostic radiology and treatment of rheumatic diseases, and around 100 books, book chapters and several firsts foundational textbooks in Croatian rheumatology. Most notable include

- Klinička reumatologija (Clinical Rheumatology), 1981: the first Croatian university textbook on rheumatology, used in medical postgraduate education across Croatia and the region
- Reumatologija (Rheumatology), 1995: the first Croatian 680-page comprehensive monograph on rheumatic diseases synthesizing contemporary understanding of rheumatic diseases
- Ankilozantni spondilitis (Ankylosing Spondylitis), 1978: the first monograph on ankylosing spondylitis in Croatian medical literature
- The Development of Rheumatology through Two Millennia, 2008 and Razvoj reumatologije tijekom dva tisućljeća, 2008: the first Croatian 450-page monograph on historical overview of rheumatology published in Croatian and English language
- Textbooks on Physical Medicine and Rehabilitation (1983, 1991, 1996, 2000, 2008): were adopted as a standard reference for postgraduate education in multiple medical schools

He also contributed to the Croatian Medical Encyclopaedia. and authored numerous patient manuals promoting health literacy and awareness of chronic rheumatic conditions published by the Croatian League Against Rheumatism.

As of 2025, his works had been cited over 4,600 times according to the Web of Science, and over 5,180 times according to Scopus, with an h-index of 32. His publications have also been cited more than 50 times in international rheumatology textbooks.

A complete list of his publications is available through the Croatian Scientific Bibliography (CroRIS – CROSBI)

=== Societies and Editorial Roles ===
Jajić chaired the Association of Rheumatologists of Yugoslavia (1982–1986) and led various Croatian Medical Association sections. He was founding member and president of the Croatian Society of Vertebrology (1986-1989) and president of the Croatian Rheumatology Society (1996-1998), both under the Croatian Medical Association.

He founded the Croatian Society of Rheumatic Patients (1982), focused on patient education and support, and was the founder and president of the Croatian League against Rheumatism (1992-2001) aimed at public health advocacy.

He initiated and edited the leading national journal in the field Fizikalna medicina i rehabilitacija] (1984), the Croatian Rheumatology Society journal Reumatizam (1991-1998), and the Croatian League Against Rheumatism journal Reumatičar / Reuma (1989), aimed at patients promoting awareness of chronic rheumatic conditions.

He was a member of the editorial board of several international journals, including Clinical Rheumatology, New European Rheumatology, and Acta Clinica Croatica.

=== Memberships ===
Jajić was a member or honorary member of numerous international and domestic scientific and professional organizations. Internationally, he was affiliated with:

- British Society for Rheumatology (since 1983)
- European League Against Rheumatism (EULAR) – member of several standing committees including Epidemiology and Investigative Rheumatology
- International League Against Rheumatism (ILAR) – invited speaker and delegate
- International Rehabilitation Medicine Association (IRMA)
- Osteoarthritis Research Society (OARS)
- European Society of Osteoarthrology (ESOA)
- British Osteoporosis Society
- Mediterranean Committee on Behçet’s Disease
- International Board of the Mediterranean of Rheumatology
- Mediterranean Tri-continental Medical Association

He was also an honorary member of national rheumatology societies in:

- Czech Republic (1985)
- Slovakia (1986)
- Hungary (1986)
- Bulgaria (1989)
- Germany (1990)
- Poland (1992)
- Russia (1991)

Domestically, he was:

- A full member of the Croatian Academy of Medical Sciences (since 1982)
- An honorary member of the Croatian Medical Association
- An honorary member of the Croatian Rheumatology Society
- An honorary member of the Croatian League against Rheumatism
- Actively involved in numerous Croatian scientific, academic, and public health organizations

=== Awards and honours ===
Sources:

- Member, Croatian Academy of Medical Sciences (1982)
- Ruđer Bošković Award (1988), the highest national honor for scientific achievement in Croatia
- Ladislav Rakovac Prize (1993) by the Croatian Medical Association
- City of Zagreb Award (2001) for lifelong contribution to medical science and public health
- Featured in Croatian Lexicon (1996), Croatian Biographical Lexicon (2005), Croatian Encyclopedia (2013)
- Presented in the Zagreb University School of Medicine 2017 monograph
- Part of the Croatian Academy of Science and Art Museum of Medicine and Pharmacy collection (2023)
- Included in the book "Ankylosing Spondylitis" (1987) by J.M.H. Moll alongside global pioneers of the field
- Numerous international and domestic awards of scientific, academic and professional associations and organizations (1964–2001)

=== Personal life ===
Since 1959, he had been married to Ivanka Jajić (née Devčić; 1931–1996), a physician who graduated from the University of Zagreb School of Medicine and specialized in school medicine. During the Croatian War of Independence, although retired, she was actively involved in humanitarian and organizational work within wartime healthcare.

The couple had two daughters, both physicians. Zrinka is a specialist in rheumatology, a full professor at the University of Zagreb School of Medicine and was head of the Clinical Ward for Rheumatic Diseases at the Department for Rheumatology of the University of Zagreb School of Medicine at the Sestre Milosrdnice University Hospital Center. Ines holds a PhD in microbiology and is the head of the Department of Microbiology at the same hospital.

== Selection from publications ==
- Ivo Jajić (1994). Fizijatrijsko-reumatološka propedeutika (eng Physiatric-Rheumatological Propaedeutics). the first such book in Croatian medical literature (1st ed.). Zagreb: Medicinska naklada. pp. 1–242. ISBN 978-953-176-014-0.
- Jajić, Ivo; Jajić, Zrinka (1997). Sindrom hipertrofične osteoartropatije [Hypertrophic osteoarthropathy syndrome] (in Croatian). Zagreb: Medicinska knjiga. pp. 1–169. ISBN 978-953-96055-4-2.
- Jajić, Ivo; Jajić, Zrinka (2001). Rentgenska dijagnostika reumatskih bolesti [Radiological Diagnostics of Rheumatic Diseases] (in Croatian). Zagreb: Medicinska naklada. pp. 1–231. ISBN 978-953-176-133-8.
- Ivo Jajić (2009). Život s reumatologijom (eng Life with Rheumatology). Zagreb: Medicinska naklada. pp. 1–204. ISBN 978-953-176-452-0.
