= Tomislav Uzelac =

Croatian computer programmer

Tomislav Uzelac is the Croatian programmer who wrote an amp MPEG audio decoder that is considered to be the first successful software MP3 player. Two students from the University of Utah, Justin Frankel and Dmitry Boldyrev adapted the decoder (which was originally written for Unix-like systems) to work on Windows and made it the MP3 decoding engine for the original version of Winamp (it was later replaced with Nullsoft's own Nitrane decoder, which was then replaced with a Fraunhofer ISO decoder).

Uzelac studied at the University of Zagreb's Faculty of Electrical Engineering and Computing (FER) under professor Mario Kovač, working on MP3 software decoding. In 1997 he created AMP, and also graduated with an engineer's degree from FER.

In order to manage AMP as a commercial product, Uzelac partnered with American media entrepreneur Brian Litman to form Advanced Multimedia Products "AMP". Advanced Multimedia Products was later merged into PlayMedia Systems - also co-founded by Uzelac. AMP was more widely marketed beginning in 1998 and facilitated world-wide MP3 popularization.

Uzelac's company 2x2 Games is known for Unity of Command (2011), a strategy wargame, and its sequel Unity of Command II (2019).
