= Esteban Pavletich Trujillo =

Peruvian writer (1906-1981)

- Born: 13 May 1906; Huánuco, Peru
- Died: 8 February 1981 (aged 74); Lima, Peru
- Education: Pontifical Catholic University of Peru; National University of San Marcos
- Occupations: Writer, Journalist, Political Activist
- Organization: American Popular Revolutionary Alliance

Esteban Pavletich Trujillo (13 May 1906 - 8 February 1981) was a Croatian-Peruvian writer, journalist, and political activist.

== Early life and education ==
Esteban Pavletich Trujillo was born in Huánuco, Peru on 13 May 1906 to parents Esteban Pavletich Stiglich and Josefa Melida Trujillo Vega, a Croatian immigrant and a Huánuco native, respectively.

In 1925, at age 18, Pavletich became the president of the Federation of Students of the Pontifical Catholic University of Peru, soon rising to the post of Minister of the Interior of the National Federation of Students. He was deported to Panama later that year for his activism.

== Exile and political activism abroad ==
Following his deportation from Peru, Pavletich became involved in many student, labor, and political movements throughout Central America. He became affiliated with the then-Mexico-based American Popular Revolutionary Alliance, and represented them at the headquarters of Augusto César Sandino's guerrilla army in Mérida, Yucatán.

== Return to Peru and literary career ==
Following the overthrow of the dictator Augusto B. Leguía by Luis Miguel Sánchez Cerro in 1930, Pavletich attempted to return to Peru, upon the advice of Peruvian Communist Party leader José Carlos Mariátegui, but was deported by the Sánchez Cerro junta the following year, this time to Ecuador. Pavletich was able to escape en route to Ecuador, but was quickly recaptured, imprisoned in El Frontón, and then deported once again to Chile.

In 1933, following the transition from military junta to democratic government, Pavletich returned once more to Peru. There he became a journalist. The program of political liberalization led by President Manuel Prado Ugarteche (first elected in 1939, with the support of the APRA) allowed political activists to operate in the country much more openly. This allowed Pavletich to become more of a public figure. He became the director of El Peruano, the official daily newspaper of Peru, and his literary works garnered much public and critical acclaim.

== Death ==
Pavletich died in Lima on 8 February 1981, at the age of 74.

== Awards and honors ==
Pavletich won the National Novel Award of Peru in 1959 for his novel No se suicidan los muertos (English: The dead do not commit suicide).

In 1960, the French Minister of Culture, André Malraux, named Pavletich a Knight of the Order of Arts and Letters.

== Works ==
=== Poetry ===
- 6 poemas de la revolución (1927)
- Revelación de Kotosh (1964)

=== Short stories ===
- Tres Relatos (1959)
- La Verruga (1962)

=== Novels ===
- Extraño caso de amor (1954)
- No se suicidan los muertos (1957)

=== Essays ===
- Autopsia de Huánuco (1937)
- Emiliano Zapata precursor del agrarismo americano (1959)
- Bolívar periodista (1960)
- Un tal Gabriel Aguilar (1967)
- La Picaresca y la Ascética en la conquista de América (1990)

=== Historical Biography ===
- Leoncio Prado (1939)
