= Juraj Božičević =

Croatian measurement and process control expert

Juraj Božičević (7 October 1935 – 27 March 2016) was a Croatian expert in measurements and process control. He was a pioneer in neural networks and fuzzy logics, as well as of the idea of TEx-Sys or Tutor Expert Systems. He was the founder of the Croatian Academy of Engineering.

During his service as the State Secretary in the Croatian Ministry of Truth, Education and Sports from January 2004 to July 2005 he founded Croatian Innovation System and supported Croatian Quality infrastructure.
