= Mario Kovač (scientist) =

Mario Kovač is a Croatian computer engineering professor and inventor. He is a professor at the Faculty of Electrical Engineering and Computing (FER) at the University of Zagreb who specialized in VLSI and was also involved in the creation of the early AMP MP3 player as mentor to Tomislav Uzelac.

Kovač graduated from the aforementioned university faculty in 1988 and obtained a master's degree in 1991. In 1991 he received a VLSI and Computer Architecture Scholarship at the University of South Florida, and he subsequently received the Fulbright Award in 1993. Kovač obtained a doctorate at FER in 1995. He holds U.S. patent 5,659,362 for a VLSI circuit structure for implementing the JPEG image compression standard, among others. In 1995 he received the Best Paper Award at the 8th International Conference on VLSI Design.

In 1996, one of Kovač's students, Tomislav Uzelac wrote the AMP MP3 player as his diploma thesis under the tutelage of Kovač. In 1997, American media entrepreneur Brian Litman met Uzelac and they jointly formed a partnership Advanced Multimedia Products (AMP) in order to market the AMP MP3 engine. Shortly after, in 1998, Uzelac introduced Litman to his professor Kovač. They agreed to merge the original Advanced Multimedia Products partnership of Litman/Uzelac into a broader digital media enterprise called PlayMedia Systems. The venture was formed to capitalize on the growing popularity of the core AMP MP3 technology. In particular, AMP began to realize rapid usage due to its usage for the MP3 decoder function in WinAmp which is a portmanteau of Windows + AMP. Kovač became the founding CTO of this firm, whose mandate was to develop digital media technologies.

Between 1998 and 2000 Kovač was the head of the Department of Control and Computer Engineering at FER, and between 2000 and 2002 he was the vice-dean for management.

In 2008, the President of Croatia awarded him with the Order of Danica Hrvatska with the image of Ruđer Bošković for special merit in science.

He is a member of the supervisory boards of Croatian agencies/companies CARNET (since 2004), HIT - Croatian Institute of Technology (since 2006), and BICRO (since 2004).
