= Nova, Hungary =

Nova
- Village
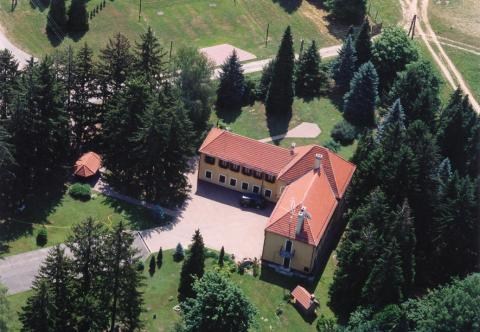

- Flag Coat of arms

- Location of Nova
- Coordinates: 46.68446°N 16.67788°E
- Country: Hungary
- Region: Western Transdanubia
- County: Zala
- District: Lenti

Area
  - Total: 39.37 km^{2} (15.20 sq mi)

Population (1 January 2025)
  - Total: 727
  - Density: 18.5/km^{2} (47.8/sq mi)
- Time zone: UTC+1 (CET)
  - Summer (DST): UTC+2 (CEST)
- Postal code: 8948
- Area code: (+36) 92
- Website: nova.hu

Nova is a village in Zala County, Hungary.
