= Zoran Vondraček =

Croatian mathematician

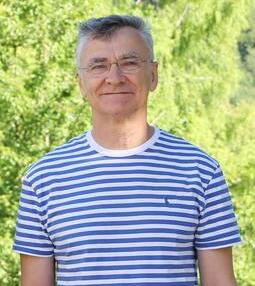
- Vondraček in Oberwolfach, 2022
- Education: University of Florida
- Scientific career
- Fields: Mathematics
- Workplaces: University of Zagreb
- Thesis: Special classes of Excessive Functions Satisfying Harnack's Principle (1990)
- Doctoral advisor: Murali Rao

Zoran Vondraček (born July 28, 1959) is a Croatian mathematician specializing in Lévy processes, transformed Brownian motions, and probabilistic potential theory. He is a professor of mathematics at the University of Zagreb.

== Education and career ==
Vondraček graduated from the University of Zagreb in 1982, and obtained a master's degree in mathematics there in 1986. He completed a Ph.D. at the University of Florida in 1990 under the supervision of Murali Rao. In 1992 Vondraček was made assistant professor of mathematics at the University of Zagreb. He became an associate professor in 1997, and a full professor in 2002.

Vondraček is a member of the Croatian Academy of Sciences and Arts, the American Mathematical Society, and the Institute of Mathematical Statistics.

== Recognition ==
In 2006 Vondraček received the Award for Natural Sciences and Mathematics of the Croatian Academy of Sciences and Arts, alongside oceanographer Nada Krstulović and marine biologist Mladen Šolić. He won the 2010 Croatian National Science Award in the category of natural sciences, alongside Nevenko Bilić and Kristian Vlahoviček. In 2019 he received the University of Florida's Preeminence Award alongside mathematician Hrvoje Šikić. In 2020 he won the Andrija Mohorovičić Prize of the University of Zagreb.
