= Albert Kinert =

Albert Kinert (born in 1919 in Vinkovci, Croatia and died in 1987 in Zagreb, Croatia) was a Yugoslav artist and illustrator who worked in the media of painting and graphic arts.

Otok (Island, 1978)

Under the pseudonym Toma Božić he made a series of comics published in the magazines Zabavnik (Publisher: Ustaški nakladni zavod, Zagreb) (The Perished City and The Explorers of the West), Kerempuh (The Story of Caliph the Tyrant, The Golden Key and Nasreddin Hodja) and Pokret (Beware of the Hand of Senj). He was also an illustrator for the magazines Otkrića, Suvremena tehnika, Vjesnik u srijedu and for many books including: Bakonja fra Brne and Priče iz davnina (Tales of Long Ago). He also published seven graphic maps (notably, in 1943 he published the map 40 Lithographs). He participated in the first exhibition of the Mart group in 1957, after which he founded the Zagreb 58 group together with Zlatko Prica, Edo Murtić, Nikola Reiser, Ivan Picelj, Vojin Bakić, Kosta Angeli Radovani and Dušan Džamonja. From 1954 to 1956 he taught at the School of Applied Arts in Zagreb. In the early 1960s, he was appointed assistant professor at the Academy of Fine Arts in Zagreb and later as full professor (1971–1984).

He exhibited at many solo and group shows in Croatia and abroad. He had a retrospective exhibition at the Modern Gallery, Zagreb (1985). He received nine awards, including the Honorary Award by an international jury at the 2nd International Exhibition of Graphic Arts (Ljubljana, 1957), the JAZU (Yugoslav Academy of Sciences and Arts) Cabinet of Graphics Award (1960), the Grigor Vitez Award for Illustration (for the book The Most Beautiful Classical Motifs, Školska knjiga, 1970), the Vladimir Nazor Award (Exhibition of Graphics and Drawings, JAZU Cabinet of Graphics, 1970) and the Grand Prix at the 7th Slavonija Painting Biennale (1979).

== Published works on Albert Kinert ==
- Dragojević, Danijel - Albert Kinert, (Naprijed, Zagreb, 1963).
- Bučan, Jagor – Albert Kinert, (ALU – Zagreb, Art Studio Azinović, Zagreb, 2002).
