= Virgilije Nevjestić =

Croatian painter (1935–2009)

- Born: November 22, 1935
- Died: August 25, 2009 (aged 73)

Virgilije Nevjestić (22 November 1935 – 25 August 2009) was a Croatian and Bosnian graphic artist, painter and poet who lived in Paris.

== Biography ==
He was born in Kolo near Tomislavgrad and graduated from the Art School in Sarajevo and the Academy of Fine Arts in Zagreb in 1963. He graduated from the Special Department for graphics in 1966. From 1968 until his death he lived in Paris. He is considered one of the finest Bosnian-Herzegovinian artists of the generation that marked the seventies in Yugoslavia.

In 1987 he founded L’académie Virgile in Paris, where he taught a special course of graphic arts and printmaking. He has taught at the French Institute for the restoration of works of art. In his graphic narrative, the surreal component prevails; with the reproductions and figurative details, in conjunction with the poetic projection of his childhood and the country, he reaches oniric-fiction and nostalgic atmosphere. In the lyrical vision of life and amenities of its graphics, there is a strong dramatic tension, a poetic protest against the destruction of the reality of alienation of modern civilization. His line is melodious and thorough, the composition usually consists of a series of scenes separated, confessing and symbolic in character. In his recent works, linear manner gives way to tone design of objects, with rich light and chromatic effects.

He has published maps, prints, and painted literary published poems of Antun Branko Šimić, Dragutin Tadijanović, Stjepan Čuić, Mile Pešorda and Charles Baudelaire.

Nevjestic died in a hospital August 2009, in the Parisian suburb of L'Haÿ-les-Roses, where he'd been treated since September 2008.

== Exhibitions ==
He had solo exhibitions in Zagreb, Sarajevo, Belgrade, Milan, Paris, Boston, Tokyo, Florence, London, Rome, The Hague, Brussels, Vancouver and New York City. He also wrote poems which he illustrated with his own drawings.

== Poems ==
- Mémoire amoureuse (1980)
- Ibi, my love (1980)
