= Juan Gargurevich =

Peruvian journalist

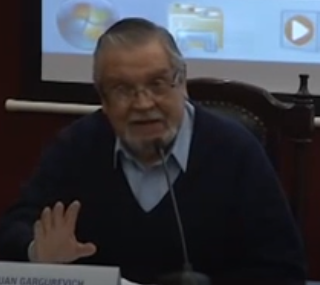
Juan Gargurevich in a 2012 conference

Juan Gargurevich (born 1934 in Mollendo, Peru) is a Peruvian journalist. He is the foremost historian of communication media in Peru.
