= Miroslav Radman =

Croatian-French biologist

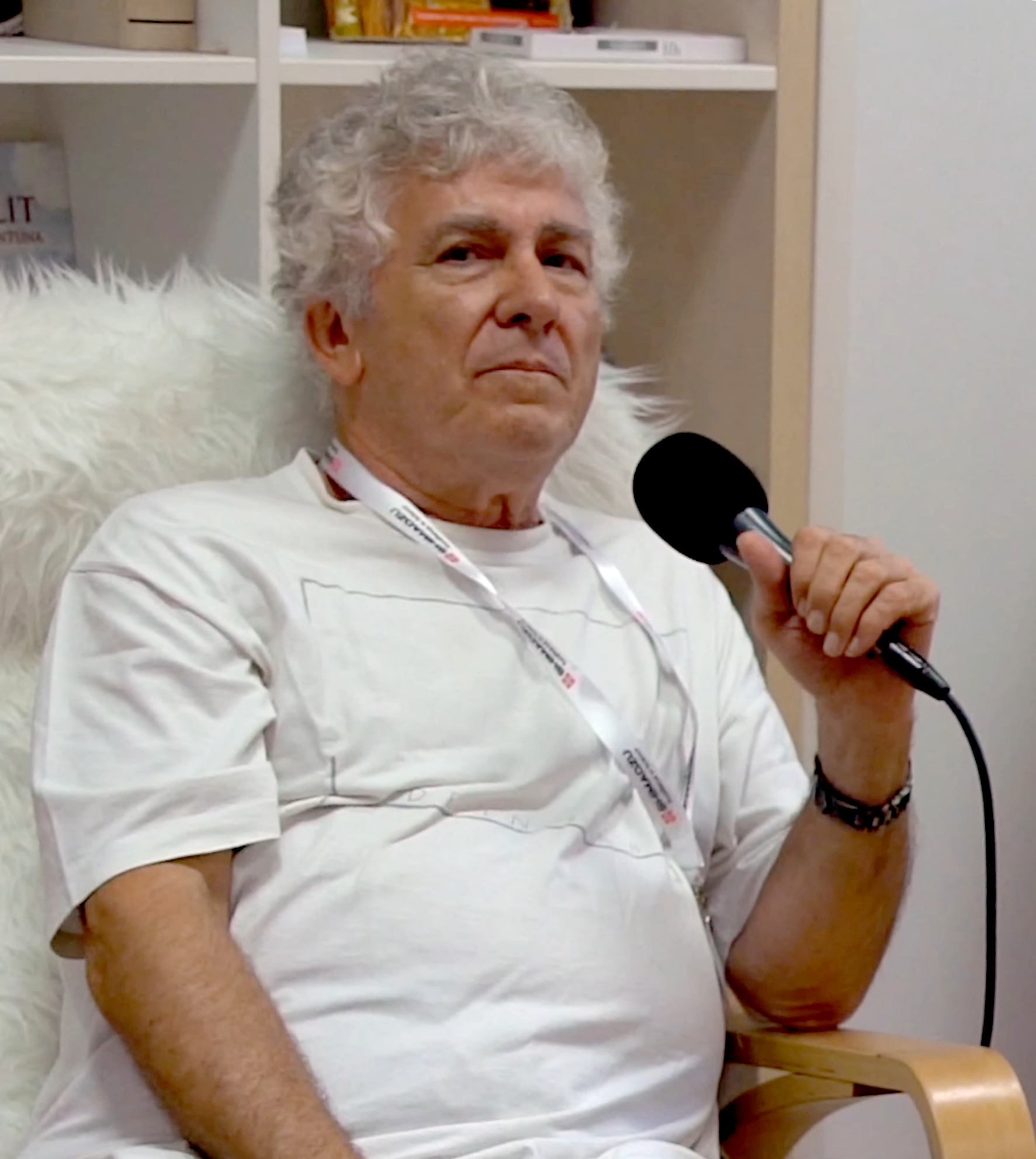
Radman at the 2019 FEMS Summer School for Postdocs

Miroslav Radman (born April 30, 1944) is a Croatian-French biologist.

== Biography ==
Radman was born in Split, PR Croatia, Yugoslavia. From 1962–1967 he studied experimental biology, physical chemistry and molecular biology at the University of Zagreb and in 1969 he obtained a doctorate degree in molecular biology at the Free University of Brussels. He spent the next three years at Harvard University as a postdoctoral researcher. From 1973 until 1983 he was Professor of Molecular Biology at the Free University of Brussels and from 1983 until 1998 the Research Director at the French Centre for Scientific Research at the University of Paris 7. He is now a professor of cellular biology at the Faculté de Médecine – Necker, Université Paris V, Paris, France. In 2002 he became a full member of the French Academy of Sciences, the first Croat to do so in the Academy's history. Radman is a co-founder of the Mediterranean Institute For Life Sciences located in Split, Croatia.

== Scientific work ==
Radman's specialty is DNA repair. His work with Evelyn M. Witkin set the basis for the discovery of the SOS response. The SOS response hypothesis was put forward by Radman in 1970 in a letter sent to various researchers, and later published in 1974.

With his group he demonstrated the molecular mechanism of speciation by showing that DNA mismatch repair mechanism prevents recombination between similar chromosomes which leads to establishment of genetic barriers between species.

In 2011 Radman won the FEMS-Lwoff Award, given out by the Federation of European Microbiological Societies, for his research of DNA repair mechanism in Deinococcus radiodurans. He clarified the molecular mechanism that allows Deinococcus radiodurans to repair its fatally damaged DNA.

Radman developed a methodology which enables direct visualization of horizontal gene transfer.

== Awards and memberships ==
- Antoine Lacassagne Award (1979), Grand Prix of the French League Against Cancer for the discovery of the mutagenic SOS system in bacteria
- Golden Eureka of Innovation (1990)
- Grand Prix Charles-Leopold Mayer of the French Academy of Science for the co-discovery of DNA error correction (mismatch repair)
- Medal of Honour (1992) awarded by Society for the Encouragement of Progress
- Spiridion Brusina Medal (1998) at the 100th anniversary of the Croatian Naturalists' Society
- Leopold Griffuel Prize for the contributions to the field of DNA repair
- Richard Lounsbery Award – Joint Award of the French and U.S. national academies of science for the discovery of DNA mismatch repair as genetic barrier between related species
- Science Award (2000) from the “U.S. Environmental Mutagen Society” for "far-reaching research contributions to understanding the profound consequences of mutation and recombination, in global genomic responses, DNA repair, cancer and evolution"
- Katzir Katchalsky Honorary Lecturer (2000), Weizmann Institute, Israel
- Grand Prix de l'INSERM (2003) awarded by the French Institute of Health and Medical Research
- Leonardo Award (2004) for creativity in scientific research
- FEMS-Lwoff Award (2011) for his research of DNA repair mechanism in Deinococcus radiodurans
- Fellow of French Academy of Sciences
- Corresponding member of Croatian Academy of Arts and Sciences
- Foreign honorary member of American Academy of Arts and Sciences
- Member of The Academy of Europe(2018)
