= Croatian Medical Association =

The Croatian Medical Association (Croatian: Hrvatski liječnički zbor; abbreviation HLZ) is an organization of physicians and dentists in Croatia whose purpose is to improve professional and scientific work and the health protection of the population, to promote the interests of its members, and to foster medical ethics.

It was founded in 1874 in Zagreb under the name Zbor liječnika Hrvatske i Slavonije. ("Medical Association of Croatia and Slavonia"). Organizational units of the Association are 26 subsidiaries in major Croatian cities, and 126 professional societies and sections, which are named and divided after different areas of the medical profession.

The Association organizes various scientific conferences and congresses of Croatian physicians, issues professional scientific journals Liječnički vjesnik, Acta stomatologica croatica and other publications (e.g. Medicinska biblioteka in 91 volumes).

The Association is a member of the World Medical Association.
