= Unity of Command (video game) =

2011 video game

- Developer(s): 2x2 Games
- Publisher(s): Dvaput; 2x2 Games
- Platform(s): Microsoft Windows, Mac, Linux
- Release: WW: November 15, 2011
- Genre(s): Turn-based strategy
- Mode(s): Single-player

Unity of Command (UoC) is a 2011 turn-based strategy game developed by one man studio 2x2 Games. Unity of Command is an operational-level wargame that spans the entire 1942/43 Stalingrad Campaign on the Eastern Front. Playable from both Axis and Soviet side, it recreates enormous battles of maneuver in a turn-based strategy setting.

== Description ==
Unity of Command is a strategy game that lets players command the Red Army or Wehrmacht forces and their allies during the crucial Eastern Front campaign of 1942/43. This is the campaign that culminated in the famous Battle of Stalingrad, an event that marked a turning point in the entire war. German plans for this campaign centered on capturing the oil-rich region of the Caucasus. Stalingrad, the city that would eventually become its main focus, was rarely even mentioned in the original plans prepared by the OKH (German High Command of the Army). Soviets were on the defense strategically at the time, but the Stavka (Soviet High Command) misjudged enemy intentions and placed the bulk of its strength around Moscow. This helped the Germans as relatively thin forces remained to contend with the upcoming German offensive in the south. The initial blow delivered by German armored spearheads thus proved devastating. The summer campaign began with a seemingly unstoppable string of German victories. But even in the heat of that victorious summer, cracks were beginning to show. As they advanced eastward, the Germans carved an enormous bulge they could never hope to hold with German forces alone. To fill the gaps, they enlisted help from the armies of their Axis allies: Italy, Romania and Hungary.

The fast moving nature of the campaign also made it difficult to provide units with fuel, ammunition and other vital supplies. Time and again, German columns had to stop short of their assigned objectives and wait for logistics to catch up. It is in these circumstances during the fall of 1942 that the German offensive bogged down in the face of stiffening Soviet resistance. Their pace of advance slowed to a crawl. And the attention of the entire world became fixated on the desperate battle raging in the burning city of Stalingrad. When Soviets finally counterattacked in November 1942, the force of their attack changed the strategic situation overnight. The besiegers became the besieged. The German 6th Army in Stalingrad was encircled and destroyed, and the entire southern wing of the German Eastern Front threatened with collapse.

Soviets then mounted a series of strategic offensives that completely shattered the weaker Axis armies along the Don River. This advance threatened the Germans with an even wider encirclement and for a while an entire group of German Armies fought for its very survival in this sudden and dramatic reversal of fortunes. Then, in one final devastating stroke, Germans under von Manstein counterattacked at Kharkov and restored the situation. The armies finally came to rest on almost identical lines where the campaign started almost a year earlier.

== Reception ==
Reception

Aggregate scores
Aggregator	Score
GameRankings	83.80%
Metacritic	84/100

Review score
Publication	Score
PC Gamer (US)	8.6/10

Unity of Command received positive reviews from critics and currently holds a rating of 84 based on 7 reviews on Metacritic and 83.80% on Gamerankings based on 4 reviews.

Tim Stone of PC Gamer gave it 86/100 describing it "This game doesn't come with conventional AI. Buy it, and the Croatian devs mail you two giant, powder-filled jiffy-bags, one labelled 'Ferdinand Fuchs', the other 'Boris Bastardov'. Open these, add five gallons of vodka to the Boris bag and five gallons of schnapps to the Ferdinand, then stand back as two super-sly Ost Front generals materialise in front of you." Richard Lane of gamewatcher gave it 8/10 stating it as "One of the most refreshing turn-based strategy games I've experienced for some time. It's clever and deeply tactical, yet also manages to be relatively quick-paced and exciting."

=== Accolades ===
The game was included in Pocket Gamer's The 12 best turn-based strategy games on Steam list. PC Gamer included it in their top 20 PC strategy games. Rock, Paper, Shotgun ranked it 22nd of 50 best strategy games on PC. Wargamer included it in its list of best WW2 strategy and war games. PCGamesN also placed it amongst the best war games.

== DLCs and expansions ==
The following DLCs have been released for Unity of Command and have likewise received positive reviews:

- Unity of Command: Stalingrad Campaign (this DLC is the core game needed to play the two following expansions)
- Red Turn: The Road to Berlin 1943-45
- Black Turn: Operation Barbarossa 1941

== Sequel ==
A sequel has been developed since 2014. One of the more visible changes will be a transition from 2D to 3D graphics. Another requirement would be a 64-bit operating system. Another notable gameplay mechanic added is fog of war. The sequel, Unity of Command II, was released on Steam on November 12, 2019.
