= Cesar Bielich-Pomareda =

Minister of the Navy of Peru

Cesar Bielich-Pomareda (1874–1950) was the Minister of the Navy of Peru in the 1930s. He retired with the rank of rear-admiral of the navy.
