= Tomislav Dretar =

Croatian writer and politician

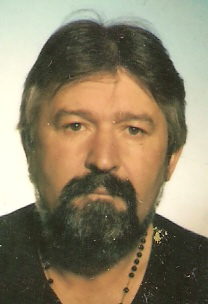
Tomislav Dretar in 1992

Tomislav Dretar (born 2 March 1945 - 25 June 2026) is a Croatian, Bosnian, French and Belgian poet, writer, critic, and translator, as well as an academic, journalist, editor, political leader and president of Bihać's Croatian Defence Council during the Bosnian War. He is also known by the French alias Thomas Dretart.

== Origins ==
Dretar was born in Nova Gradiška, Croatia, as the son of Ružica Rivić from Ljubija Rudnik in Bosnia and Herzegovina and Vladimir Dretar from Cernik in Nova Gradiška. His mother was a clerk with a finished civil School for Catholic Girls. His father, after completing the Higher Secondary School in Nova Gradiška enrolled the study of forestry at the Forestry Faculty at the University of Zagreb, but in 1941 he left for military education in Stockerau where he received the title of noncommissioned officer. He served as a noncommissioned officer in the Blue SS division from which he deserted because of the humiliating treatment of Croatians by the German commanders. In his absence, a military court sentenced him to death. Dretar's father became an Ustasha volunteer, rising to the rank of second lieutenant. From there he deserted because of the inhumane behavior of the Ustashas and their commanders and, again, was sentenced to death in his absence. He settled down in the Croatian Home Guard as a lieutenant, he was station commander in Vrba. After the fall of Nova Gradiška, Dretar's father retreated with the rest of the Croatian Armed Forces and disappeared during the Yugoslav death march of Nazi collaborators.

== Education ==
Tomislav finished the Pedagogic Faculty at the University of Rijeka, and postgraduate studies of humanities at the University of Sarajevo. Writer and literary critic, author of around ten collections of poems and over three hundred scientific, expert and critical texts from the areas of literature, sociology of culture, philosophy, fine arts and political science.

== Political career ==
In the very beginning of democratic changes in the former Social Federative Republic of Yugoslavia (SFRY), although being a Marxist educated intellectual he relinquishes his association with the Yugoslav Communist Alliance (KPJ) because of its betrayal of the people. He establishes the Bosnian Democratic Party, the first anticommunist party in Bosnia which in its Program declared itself as standing for the establishment of Bosnian-Herzegovina state independence, for its own army and police in a loose confederation.

== Military career ==
=== Bosnian War ===
Dretar during his time as a Croatian Defense Council commander in the Bihać area

When the war in Croatia started he organized an intelligence agency which tracked the movement of the Yugoslav National Army (JNA) troops in northwest Bosnia, and informed the Croatian military authorities which contributed to the timely activation of the Croatian air defense and prevented ethnic ideas whose action either fell into an empty area or were received during and in a place in which and when they had not been expected. In time and with much skill, although he did not have any military education he organized the defense of Croatians in the Bihać area, he became the president of the Croatian Democratic Union (HDZ) of Bihać, established the Croatian Defense Council (HVO) of Bihać and the Bihać area on July 28, 1992, in the village of Šmrekovac in the municipality of Velika Kladuša and became the First President and Military Commander as an officer with the title of colonel. The Croatian units numbered a total of 1,200 men organized as smaller units within the Fifth Bihać Corps as an autonomous Croatian military component. Under his command the Croatian HVO units were a component of the Army of the Republic of Bosnia and Herzegovina.

He openly opposed Mate Boban and the creation of a Croatian quasi-state of "Herzeg-Bosnia", because he saw this as the same thing that the Chetniks were doing in Croatia and in Bosnia and Herzegovina. Boban's followers tried to assassinate him a number of times, but he always succeeded in slipping away. He participated in the first combat of the army which was organized based on his project, he succeeded in building a relationship of mutual trust and equality with the Bosnian component, established and lined up on June 12, 1992, in the "Zrinski-Frankopan" barracks in Bihać in the suburb of Žegar the first Croatian Bihać battalion called the "101 Bihać-Croatian battalion", which entered in the group of the Second Croatian-Muslim Bihać brigade, which was part of the 5th Corps of the Army of Bosnia and Herzegovina named the "502 Croatian-Muslim Bihać Brigade", he organized the rescue of two piston aircraft of type Kurir, which were of great benefit during the war for supplying military and other necessary materials. He managed the organization of the creation of an Air Force and the accomplishment of the first flights on the Zagreb-Bihać line, at night, in secrecy.

Tomislav Dretar

=== Retirement ===
Because of his conflict with the advocates of the partition of Bosnia and Herzegovina and Franjo Tuđman's yes-men, he abandoned the holding of all political and military posts and leaves, with the aid of the EEC watchgroup into exile in Belgium, where he lives today, in the conviction that Tuđman worked on the conquest of Bosnia and Herzegovina, that he is guilty for the Croatian-Bosnian war, that he robbed Croatia and has divided her property among his yes-men, and also that he is the inspirer, and thereby also the evil doer of the murders of HOS generals Blaž Kraljević and Ante Paradžik. That he had secret lines of command and that he worked in agreement with Slobodan Milošević and his servant Alija Izetbegović who betrayed Bosnia and Herzegovina, and with these two men planned and carried out the plan of tearing up Bosnia and Herzegovina.

After arrival in exile in Belgium, Tomislav is employed in the Louvain-la-Neuve Catholic University. He translates, he has translated the two most respectable Bibles the so-called Jerusalem Bible and the Ecumenical translation of the Bible. Has made also the first translation of the Qur'an into Croatian in the history of Croatian contacts with Islam. He published over ten books of translations of French writers, and three of his own books in the French language.

== Bibliography ==
- Vox interioris, Sarajevo 1976.
- Iris Illyrica daring, Banja Luka 1980.
- The Path inaccessible, Bihac 1984.
- Transfigurations, Bihac 1984.
- The sister of the Night. Naple 1984.
- The Book of Desir, Bihac 1986.
- The Painting, Bunch of sunlight, Beograd, 1988.
- Douleur, rhapsodie tsigane Brussels 1988
- The bitter Silver, Bihac, 1989.
- Searche of the infinity, Kikinda, 1989.
- The Distress, Gypsys Rhapsodie, Novi Sad, 1990.
- L'image, Florilége des lumières, Paris, 2001.
- Le Foyer de paroles, Brussels 2003.ISBN 9782748199284
- The Distress, Gypsys Rhapsodie/Douleur, Rhapsodie tsigane – bilingue français-croate, Barry (Belgium), 2007. ISBN 978-2-87-459-231-7
- Le Foyer des paroles, Paris, 2008.
- In doors of the Inaccessible/Aux Portes de l'Inaccessibles/Na vratima nedostupnog – bilingue français-croate, Brussel, 2009.
- Word, my social housing/Parole, mon logement social, M.E.O. Edition French, Brussel 2010 ISBN 978-2-930333-34-2
- Word, Poetry and Philosophy – treated aesthetics(in Croatian), Brussels, Editions MEO, 2012 Brussels ISBN 978-2930333427
- Poems in Loft,(collective) – Poetry – Private Collection of Patrick H. Frèche, Flammarion, Paris, 2011, non-salable.
- Sublimisme BalkanIque Sublimisme balkanique – French Edition Editions M.E.O., Brussels 2012, ISBN 978-2-930333-56-4

=== Autheur des anthologies ===
- "Sublimisme balkanique" – Tom 1 – poètes de Croatie – anthology of poetry – ISBN 978-2-930333-56-4
- "Sublimisme balkanique" – Tom 2 – poètes de Bosnie-Herzégovine – anthology of poetry – ISBN 978-2-930702-71-1

== Awards ==
- "Slovo Gorčina" Bosnia and Herzegovina Awards for first book of poetry in 1976.

== Memberships ==
- Hrvatsko Društvo Književnika Herzegovina-Bosna. / demissioned
- Društvo pisaca BiH / demissioned
