= List of painters from Croatia =

This is a list of notable painters from, or associated with, Croatia.

== A ==
- Oskar Alexander (1876–1953)
- Lovro Artuković (born 1959)

== B ==
- Ljubo Babić (1890–1974)
- Robert Baća (1949–2019)
- Vladimir Becić (1886–1954)
- Federiko Benković (1667–1753)
- Lujo Bezeredi (1898–1979)
- Charles Billich (born 1934)
- Bernardo Bobić (died c.1695)
- Nikola Božidarević (c.1460–1517)
- Vlaho Bukovac (1855–1922)
- Eugen Buktenica (1914–1997)
- Andrija Buvina (13th Century)

== C ==
- Bela Čikoš Sesija (1864–1931)
- Giulio Clovio (1498–1578)
- Menci Klement Crnčić (1865–1930)
- Josip Crnobori (1907–2005)

== D ==
- Virgil Meneghello Dinčić (1876–1944)
- Lovro Dobričević (c.1420–1478)
- Jelena Dorotka (1876–1965)

== E ==
- Marta Ehrlich (1910–1980)

== F ==
- Emerik Feješ (1904–1969)
- Eva Fischer (1920–2015)

== G ==
- Dragan Gaži (1930–1983)
- Vilko Gecan (1894–1973)
- Ivan Generalić (1914–1992)
- Josip Generalić (1935–2004)
- Oton Gliha (1914–1999)
- Petar Grgec (1933–2006)

== H ==
- Krsto Hegedušić (1901–1975)
- Oskar Herman (1886–1974)
- Josip Horvat Međimurec (1904–1945)
- Hugo Conrad von Hötzendorf (c.1807–1869)

== I ==
- Nina Ivančić (born 1953)
- Oton Iveković (1869–1939)

== J ==
- Marijan Jevšovar (1922–1998)
- John of Kastav (15th Century)
- Ignjat Job (1895–1936)
- Drago Jurak (1911–1994)

== K ==
- Vjekoslav Karas (1821–1858)
- Albert Kinert (1919–1987)
- Jozo Kljaković (1889–1969)
- Mira Klobučar (1888–1956)
- Julije Klović (1498–1578)
- Edo Kovačević (1906–1993)
- Mijo Kovačić (born 1935)
- Julije Knifer (1924–2004)
- Ladislav Kralj (1891–1976)
- Miroslav Kraljević (1885–1913)
- Živa Kraus (born 1945)
- Kristian Kreković (1901–1985)
- Tomislav Krizman (1882–1955)
- Izidor Kršnjavi (1845–1927)
- Alfred Krupa Sr. (1915–1989)
- Ferdinand Kulmer (1925–1998)
- Heddy Kun (born 1936)

== L ==
- Ivan Lacković Croata (1932–2004)
- Loren Ligorio (born 1955)
- Vasko Lipovac (1931–2006)
- Zvonimir Lončarić (1927–2004)

== M ==
- Celestin Medović (1857–1920)
- Martin Mehkek (1936–2014)
- Ivan Milat-Luketa (1922–2009)
- Romana Milutin Fabris (born 1941.)
- Jerolim Miše (1890–1970)
- Tina Morpurgo (1907–1944)
- Antun Motika (1902–1992)
- Franjo Mraz (1910–1981)
- Marko Murat (1864–1944)
- Edo Murtić (1921–2005)

== N ==
- Virgilije Nevjestić (1935–2009)

== P ==
- Alfred Pal (1920–2010)
- Renato Percan (1936–2013); painter
- Ordan Petlevski (1930–1997)
- Ivan Picelj (1924–2011)
- Vera Nikolić Podrinska (1886–1972)
- Dimitrije Popović (born 1951)
- Oton Postružnik (1900–1978)

== Q ==
- Ferdo Quiquerez (1845–1893)

== R ==
- Ivan Rabuzin (1921–2008)
- Josip Račić (1885–1908)
- Mirko Rački (1879–1982)
- Ivan Ranger (1700–1753)
- Božidar Rašica (1912–1992)
- Slava Raškaj (1877–1906)
- Ivan Rein (1905–1943)
- Branko Ružić (1919–1997)

== S ==
- Giorgio Schiavone (c.1436–1504)
- Đuro Seder (born 1927–2022)
- Branko Šenoa (1879–1939)
- Zlatko Sirotić (born 1945)
- Matija Skurjeni (1898–1990)
- Petar Smajić (1910–1985)
- Aleksandar Srnec (1924–2010)
- Miljenko Stančić (1926–1977)
- Zlatko Šulentić (1893–1971)
- Miroslav Šutej (1936–2005)

== T ==
- Marino Tartaglia (1894–1984)
- Đuro Tiljak (1895–1965)
- Ivan Tišov (1870–1928)
- Ivana Tomljenović-Meller (1906–1988)
- Lavoslav Torti (1875–1942)
- Marijan Trepše (1887–1964)
- Ana Tzarev (born 1937)

== U ==
- Milivoj Uzelac (1897–1977)

== V ==
- Maksimilijan Vanka (1889–1963)
- Vladimir Varlaj (1895–1962)
- Ivan Večenaj (1920–2013)
- Mladen Veža (1916–2010)
- Emanuel Vidović (1870–1953)
- Mirko Virius (1889–1943)

== W ==
- Adolf Waldinger (1843–1904)

== See also ==
- List of Croatian artists
