= Croatian Museum of Naïve Art =

- Hrvatski muzej naivne umjetnosti
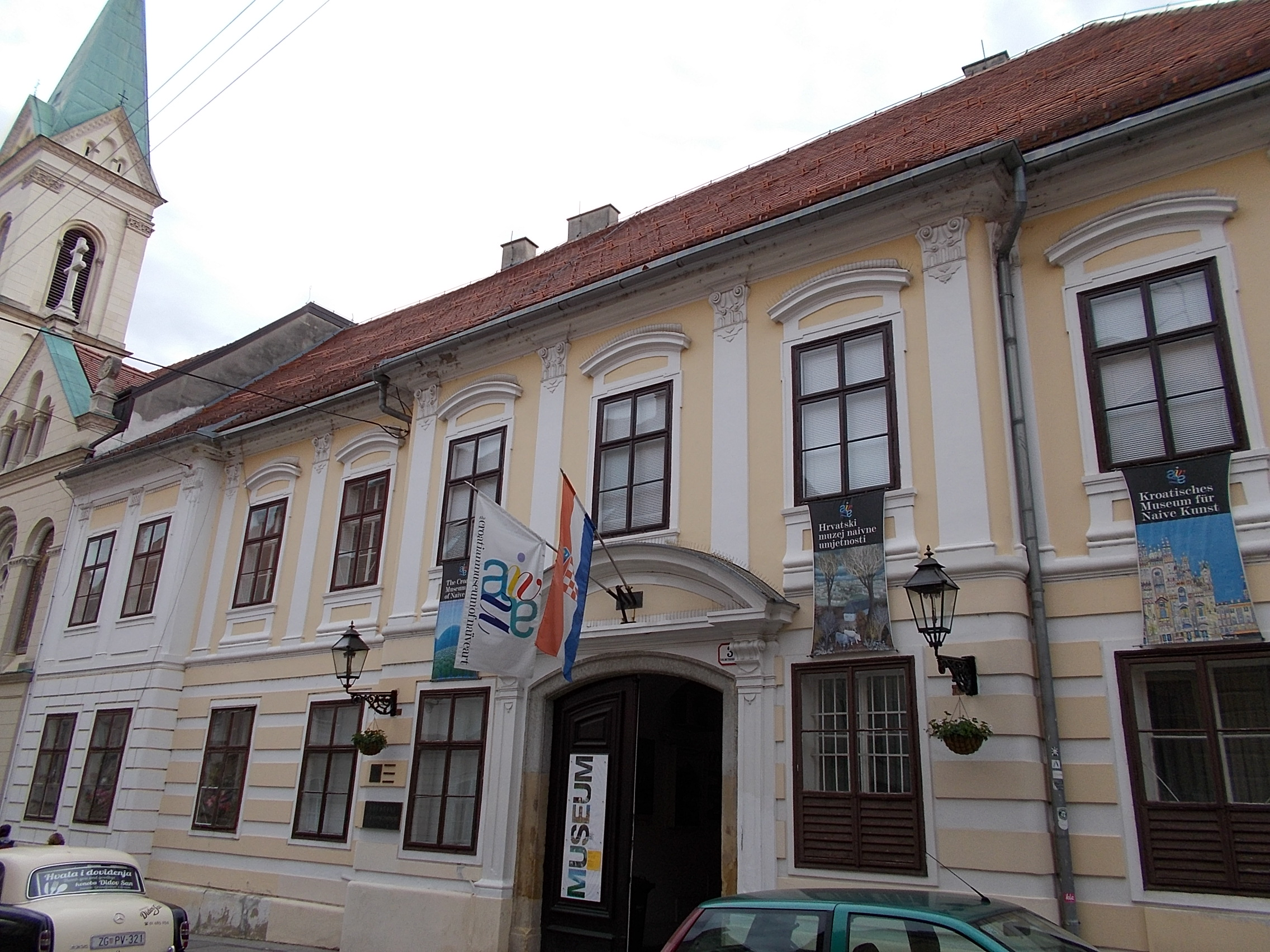
- Croatian Museum of Naïve Art in Zagreb
- Established: 1 November 1952; 73 years ago
- Location: Sv. Ćirila i Metoda 3, Zagreb, Croatia
- Coordinates: 45°48′55.5″N 15°58′24″E
- Type: Art museum
- Collection size: 1,900 objects
- Visitors: 12,000 (2009)
- Director: Mira Francetić Malčić
- Curator: Svjetlana Sumpor
- Website: http://www.hmnu.hr

The Croatian Museum of Naïve Art (Croatian: Hrvatski muzej naivne umjetnosti) is a fine art museum in Zagreb, Croatia dedicated to the work of naïve artists of the 20th century. The museum holdings consist of over 1,900 works of art - paintings, sculptures, drawings and prints, mainly by Croatians but also by other well-known international artists in the genre.

From time to time, the museum organizes topics and retrospective exhibitions by naïve artists, expert meetings and educational workshops and playrooms.

The museum is located on the first floor of the 18th-century Raffay Palace, 350 square metres (3,800 sq ft), in Gornji Grad at Sv. Ćirila i Metoda 3.

== History ==
On 1 November 1952, the Peasant Art Gallery (Seljačka umjetnička galerija) was founded in Zagreb. By 1956 it was known as the Gallery of Primitive Art (Galerija primitivne umjetnosti), and was then part of the Zagreb Municipal Galleries (today the Museum of Contemporary Art, Zagreb). Since 1994, in line with a decision by the Croatian Parliament, its title has been the Croatian Museum of Naive Art. From the very beginning the establishment was organized and run according to strict museological principles, and is deemed to be the world's first museum of naive art. According to the Croatian Ministry of Culture, those principles include: systematic collection, preservation, restoration, conservation, presentation and permanent protection of museum objects from the jurisdiction of the museum. Since 1997, the museum has undertaken many pedagogical ventures. Since 2002, the museum has concentrated on outreach to schools and the student public and intensified teaching each year in the period just before international museum day, 18 May. For this day, the museum organizes educational exhibitions, workshops and brochures geared toward younger audiences in order to educate and increase museum visitation.

== Naïve art in Croatia ==
Naïve, or primitive art is a distinct segment of the art of the 20th century. In Croatia, naïve art was at first connected with the works of peasants and working men, ordinary men and women, of whom the most successful, over the course of time, became professional artists. Naïve art assumes the work of artists who are more or less self-taught, painters and sculptors with no formal art training, but who have achieved their own creative style and a high level of art. An identifiably individual style and poetic nature distinguishes the Naïve from other "amateur" painters and sculptors, and from the general self-taught artist. The view of a Naïve artist will usually display unusual proportions and perspective, and certain illogicalities of form and space. Such characteristics are the expression of a free creative imagination, in a similar way to other 20th-century art movements such as Symbolism, Expressionism, Cubism, and Surrealism.

In Croatia, Naïve art is also seen as a democratic movement, as the movement proves anyone can create worthwhile art regardless of formal training. Within these art forms various the emotive qualities of works are often more visible than any reigning form of logic or reason. Common themes include: "the joy of life," "forgotten nature," "lost childhood," and "wonder at the world." However, Naïve art does not only reflect positive aspects of life, and dark and tragic themes can also be found within the genre.

Naïve art first appeared in Croatia at the beginning of the 1930s when the Zagreb Art Pavilion showcased an exhibition of the artists' association entitled Country (Zemlja) on 13 September 1931. Of the artists exhibited, two particularly stood out: Ivan Generalić, who showed three drawings and nine watercolors, and Franjo Mraz, who exhibited three watercolors. The artists sought to show that talent does not only reside in certain social classes or privilege and started the association with naïve art and paintings of villages or by artists from the countryside rather than cities. Themes in Croatian naïve art branched out in the 1950s from villages to "personal classics," which included architectural monuments and objects and opened a period known as "modern primitive art."

== Collections ==
The Croatian Museum of Naïve Art holds more than 1,900 works of art – paintings, sculptures, drawings and prints. Of those, around 80 pieces are on display, ranging from the early 1930s to the 1980s. The focus is on Croatian artists – of the celebrated Hlebine School, and a few of the more highly valued independent artists. In addition, artworks of significant artists of other nations are also on show.

The collection features early masters of the Hlebine school, with works starting from the 1930s. The renowned Ivan Generalić was among the first of the naive painters in Croatia to develop a distinctive creative style, and achieve a high professional standard in his art. Other artists from the first generation of the Hlebine school include Franjo Mraz, a contemporary of Generalić, and Mirko Virius, who came to renown a few years later. The stone sculptures of Lavoslav Torti, and those in wood of Petar Smajić are the first examples of Croatian naïve sculpture.

During the 1930s, social issues dominated, and rural realism is reflected in the early subjects and gritty styles. Later work shows a more idealised landscape that owes more to the imagination than the outdoor scenery. The work of the second generation of Hlebine School artists, such as Ivan Večenaj, and Mijo Kovačić date from the 1950s and 1960s, and include burlesque and grotesque figures, as well as works inspired by Biblical topics, with a strong use of colour. The painter Ivan Lacković Croata, known for twilight scenes and distinctive, melancholic elongated landscapes, is considered one of the most brilliant and remarkable draughtsmen in naïve art.

The collection also includes the work of independent artists such as Ivan Rabuzin who by the end of the 1950s—1960s was creating works of lyricism with systematic abstraction and stylisation. The work of Emerik Feješ is an example of urban Naïve, with themes of exclusively city scenes and architecture characterized by geometrical composition and vivid, expressive use of colour. Matija Skurjeni, another distinguished artist, created fantasy works with lyrical landscapes with powerful distortions.

Artists represented in the permanent collection include:

Croatian artists

- Eugen Buktenica (1914–1997)
- Emerik Feješ (1904–1969)
- Dragan Gaži (1930–1983)
- Ivan Generalić (1914–1992)
- Josip Generalić (1936–2004)
- Drago Jurak (1911–1994)
- Mijo Kovačić (1935–2026)
- Ivan Lacković Croata (1931–2004)
- Martin Mehkek (1936–2014)
- Franjo Mraz (1910–1981)
- Ivan Rabuzin (1921–2008)
- Matija Skurjeni (1898–1990)
- Petar Smajić (1910–1985)
- Slavko Stolnik (1929–1991)
- Lavoslav Torti (1875–1942)
- Ivan Večenaj (1920–2013)
- Mirko Virius (1889–1943)

Artists from other countries

- Enrico Benassi (1902–1978)
- Erik Bödeker (1904–1971)
- Ilija Bašičević (1895–1972)
- Willem Van Genk (1927–2005)
- Pietro Ghizzardi (1906–1986)
- Pavel Leonov (1906–1986)
- Sofija Naletilić Penavuša (1913–1994)
- Vangel Naumovski (1924–2006)
- Nikifor (1895–1968)
- Sava Sekulić (1902–1989)
- Milan Stanisavljević (1944)
- Germain Van der Steen (1897–1985)
- Simon Schwartzenberg (1895–1990)

== Special exhibitions ==
The Museum organises special themed exhibits focusing on individual artists, or to highlight specific aspects of naïve art. Recent such exhibits have included "Foreign Masters in the Collection", "Unknown Skurjeni", and "Ivan Lacković / Artistic Experiments".

In addition to themed exhibits in the museum, touring exhibits are arranged to other places within Croatia, and abroad in order to reach out to a wider audience. Artwork from the museum's holdings have recently been on exhibit in Japan (2006), Italy (2002), USA (2000), and Slovakia (2000). It is estimated that over 200,000 visitors saw these international shows.

== Gallery ==
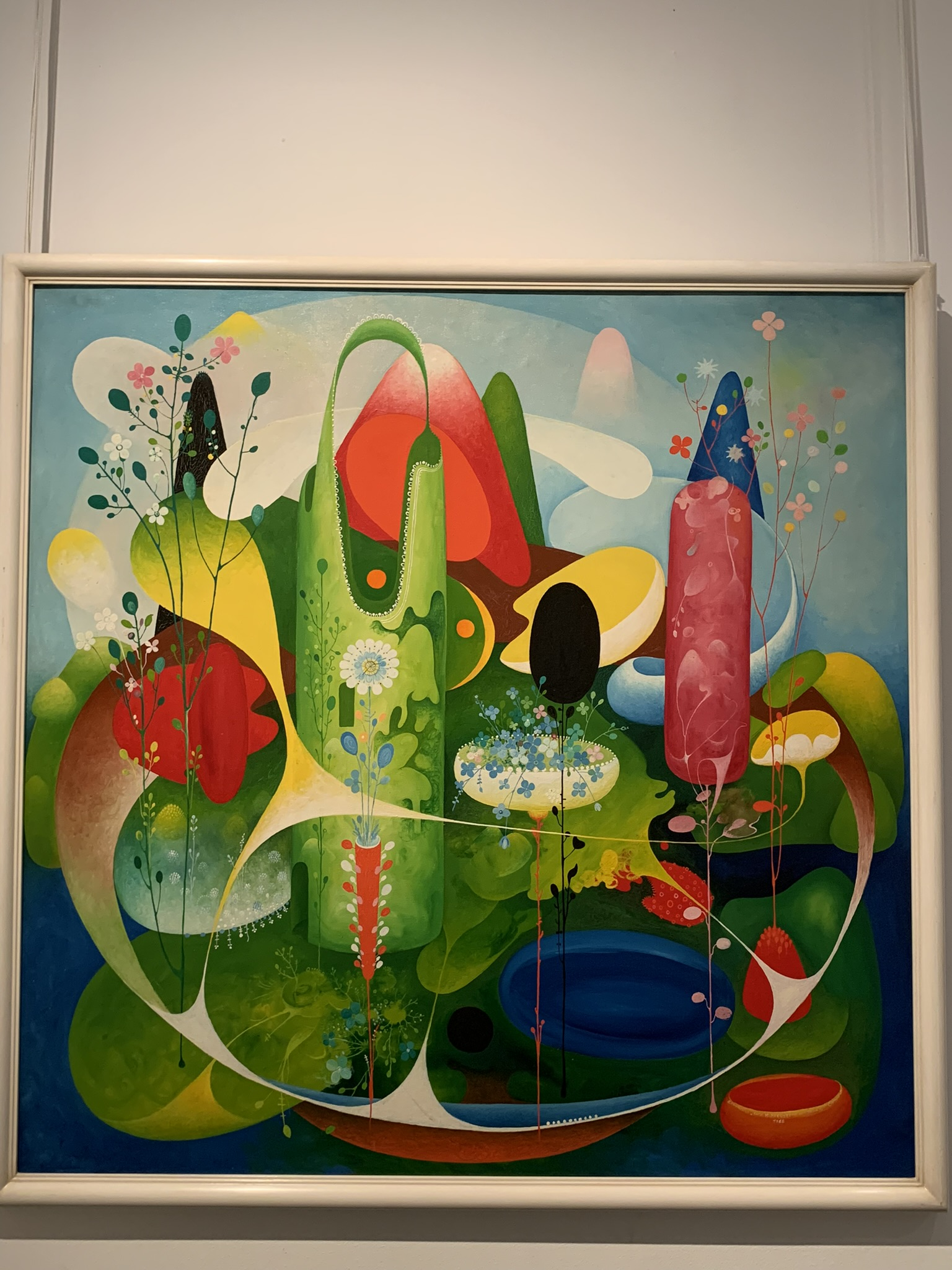

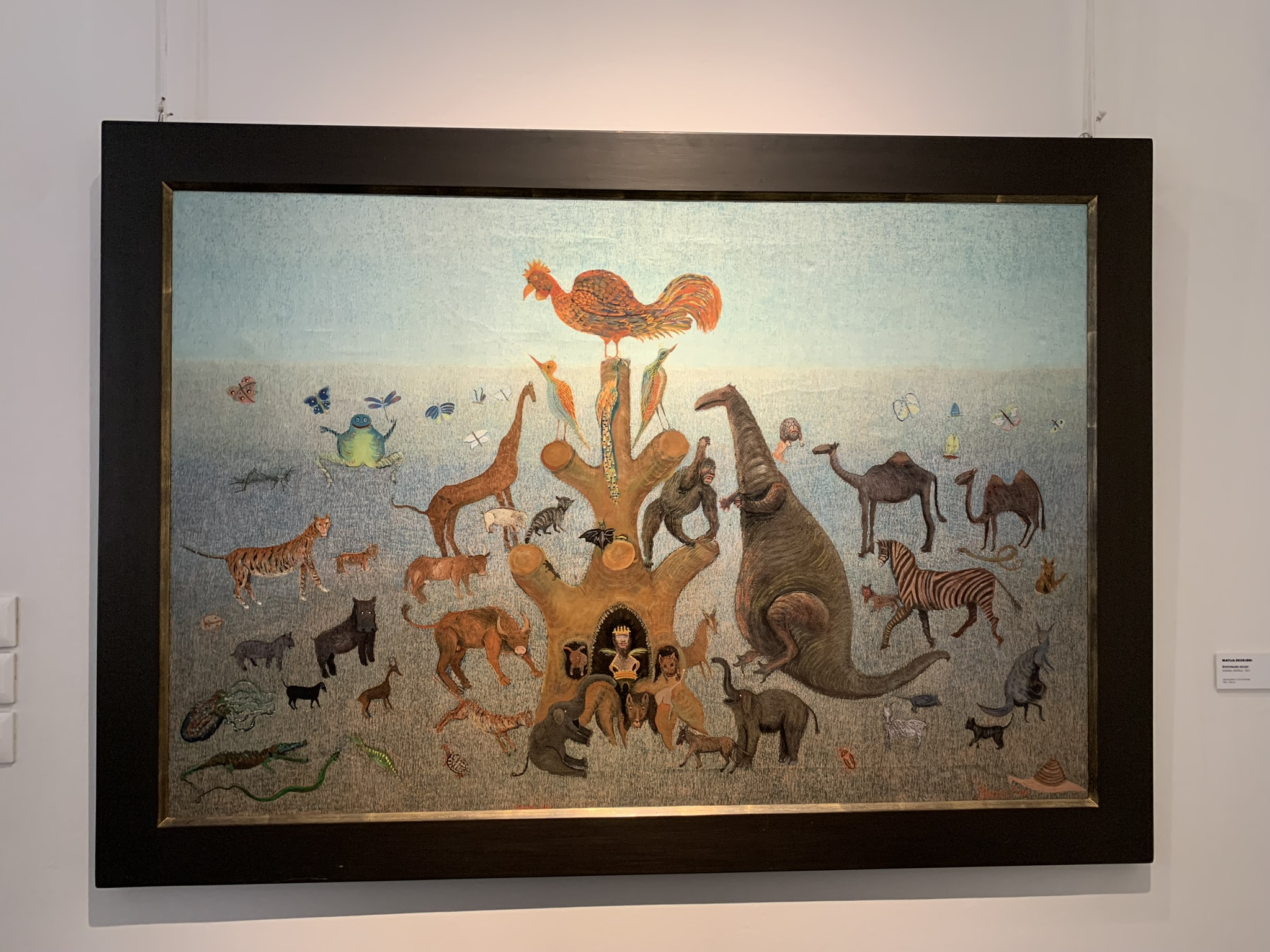

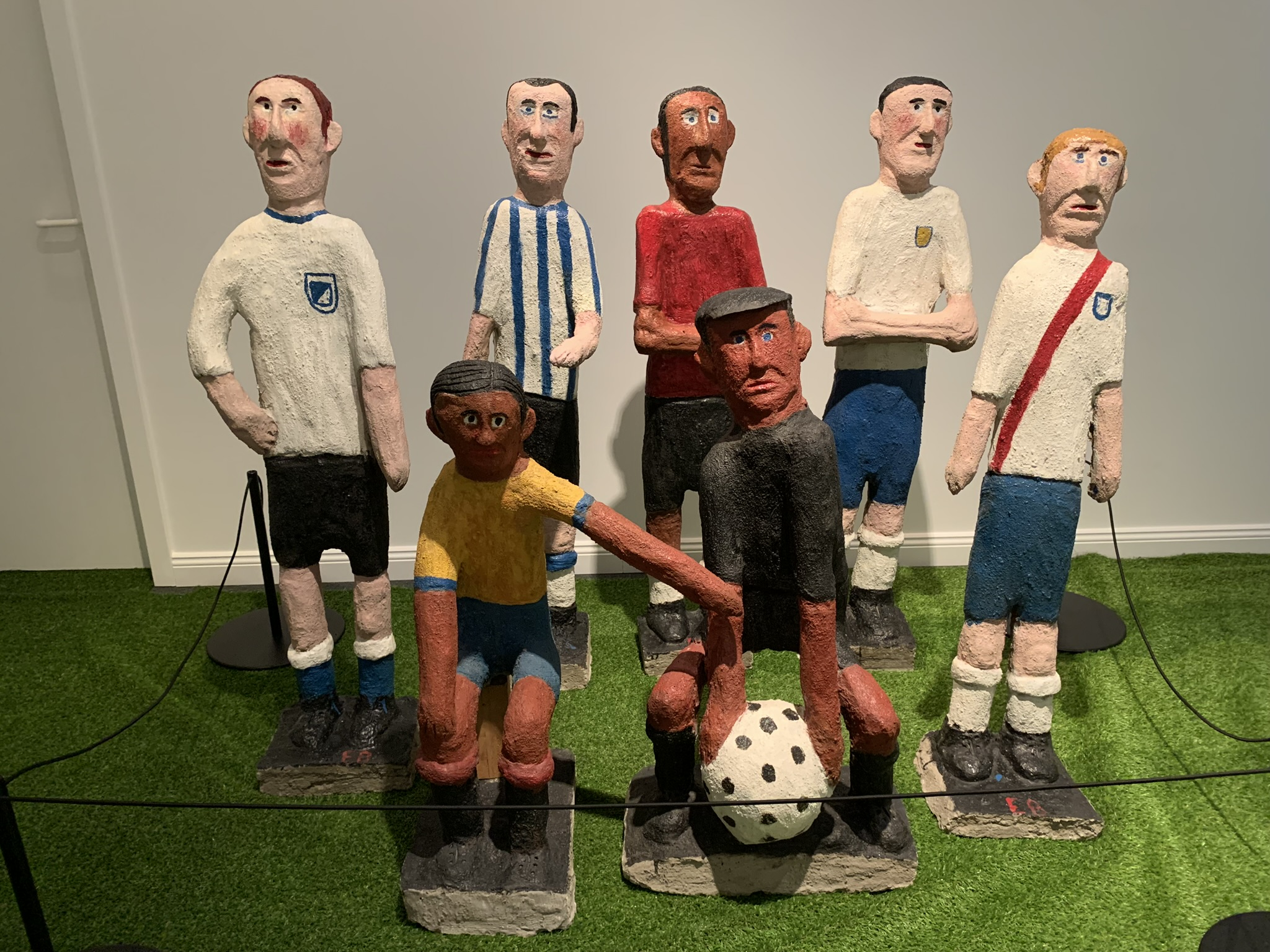

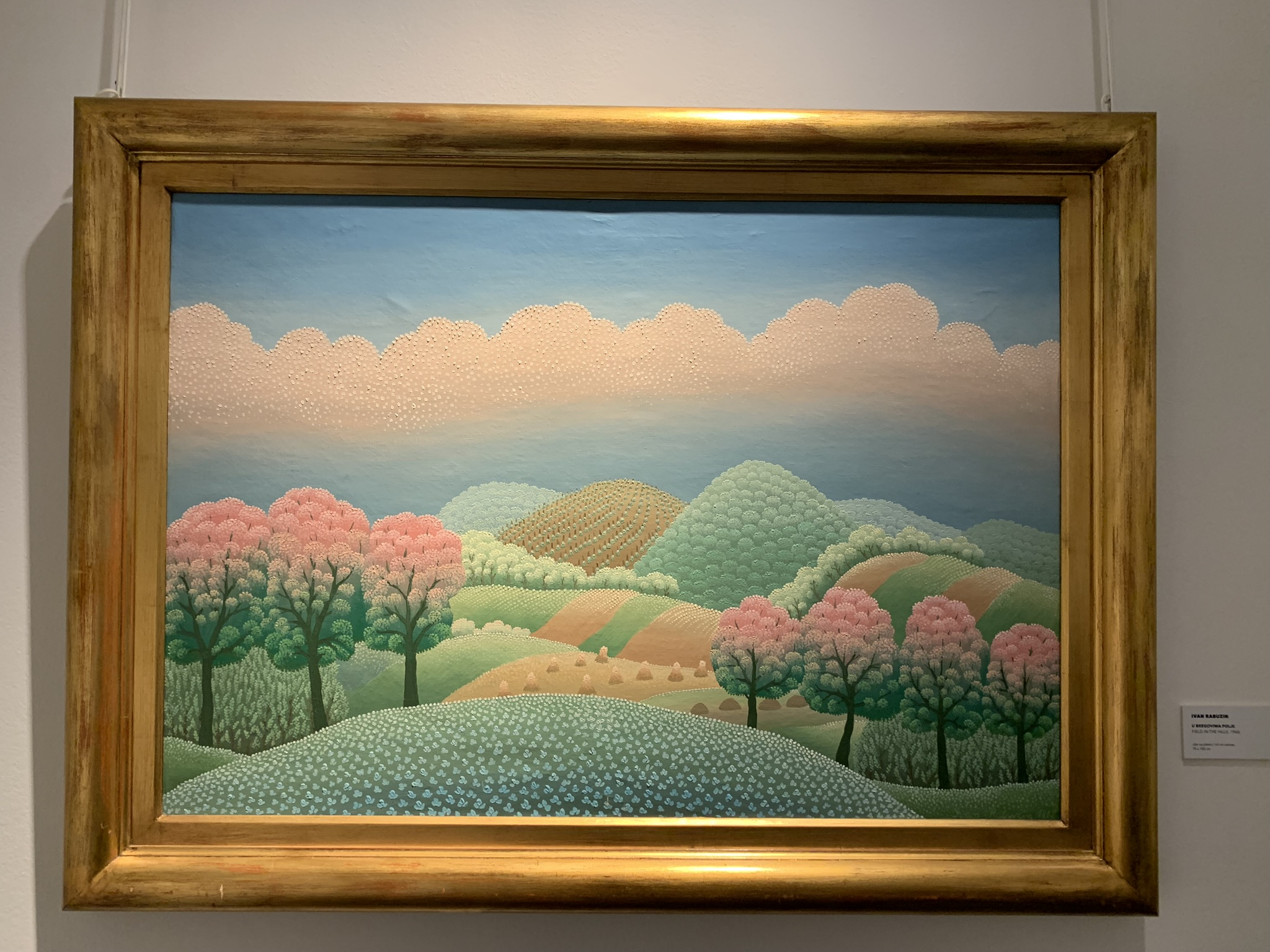

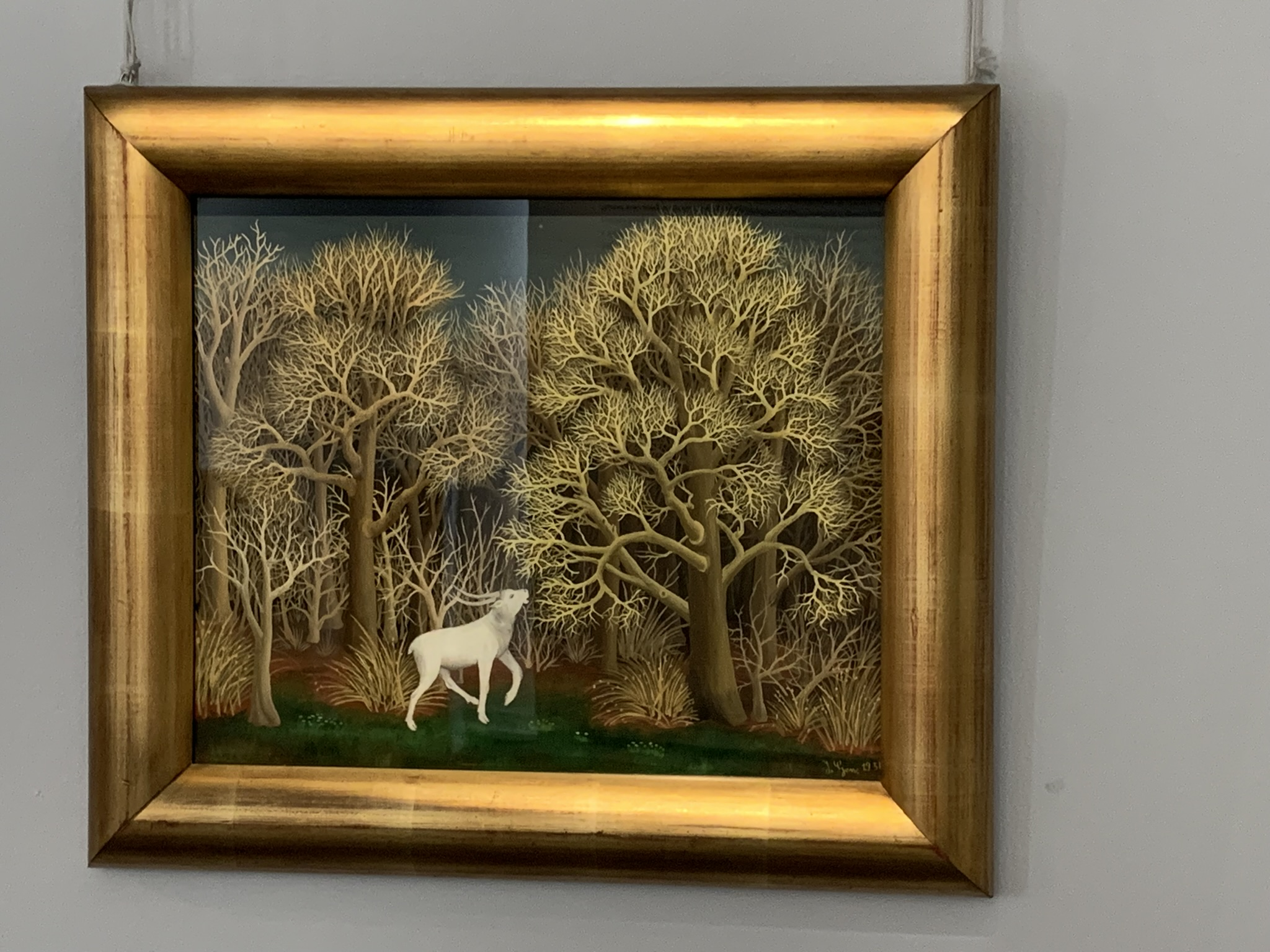

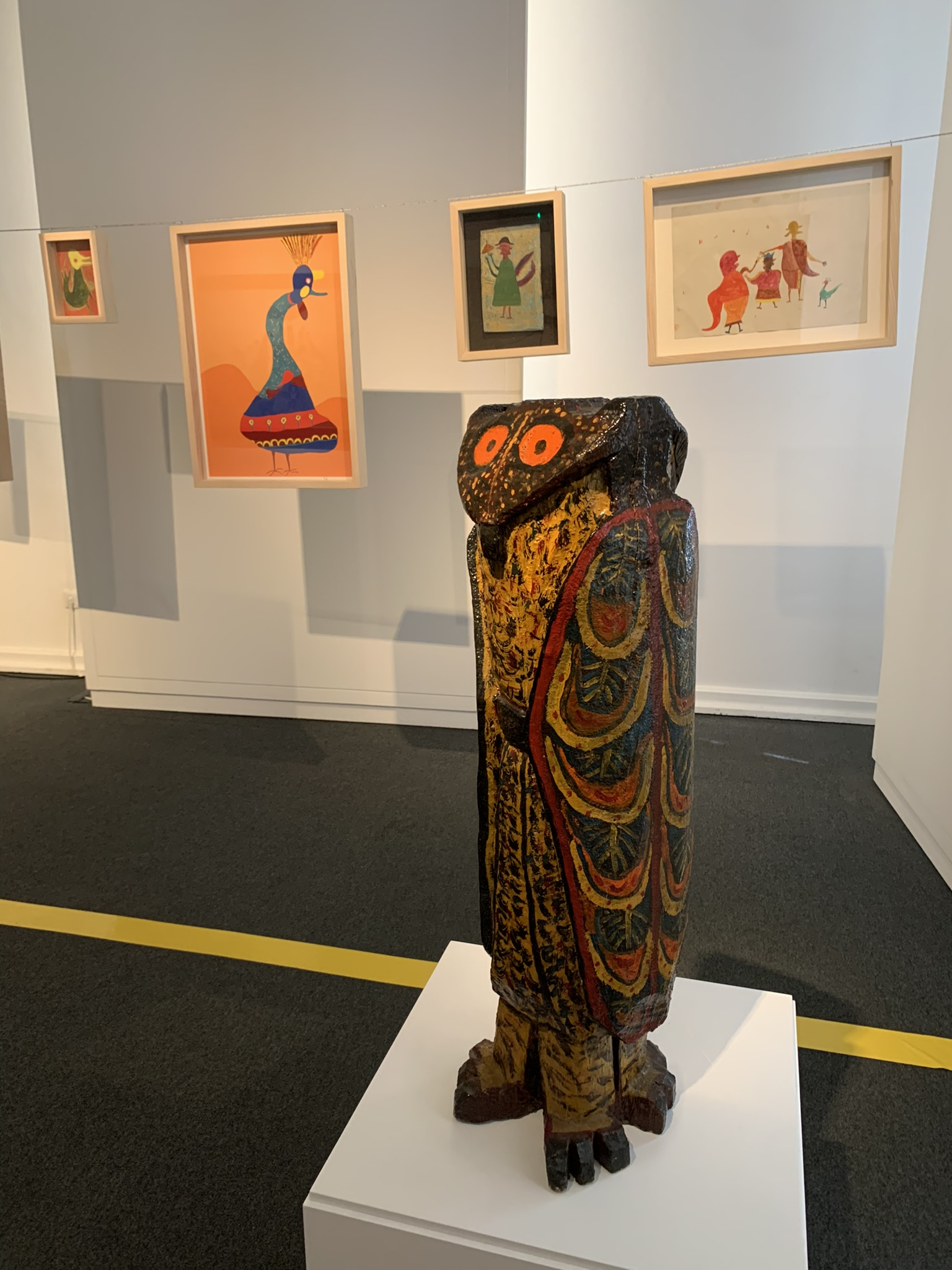

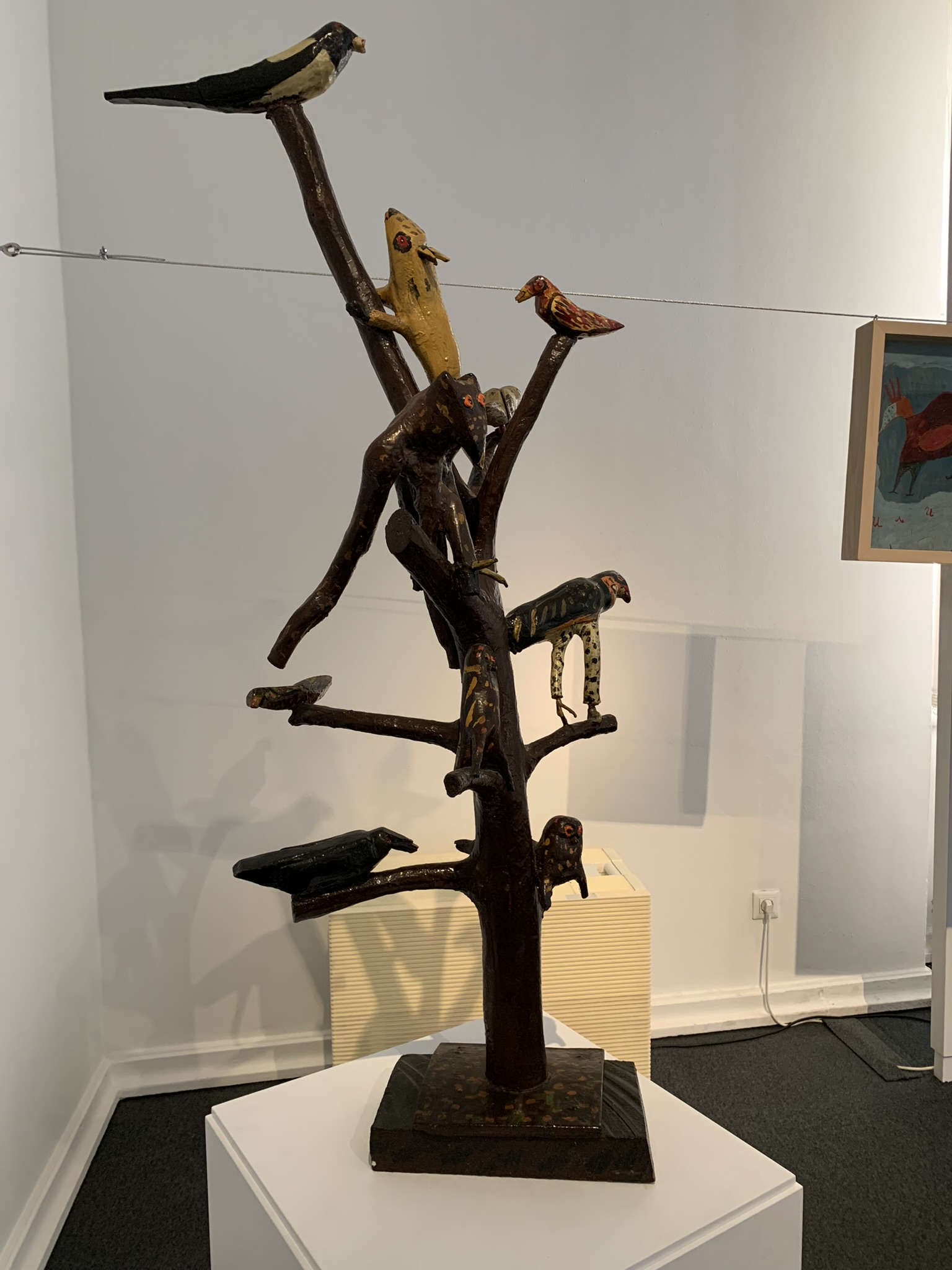

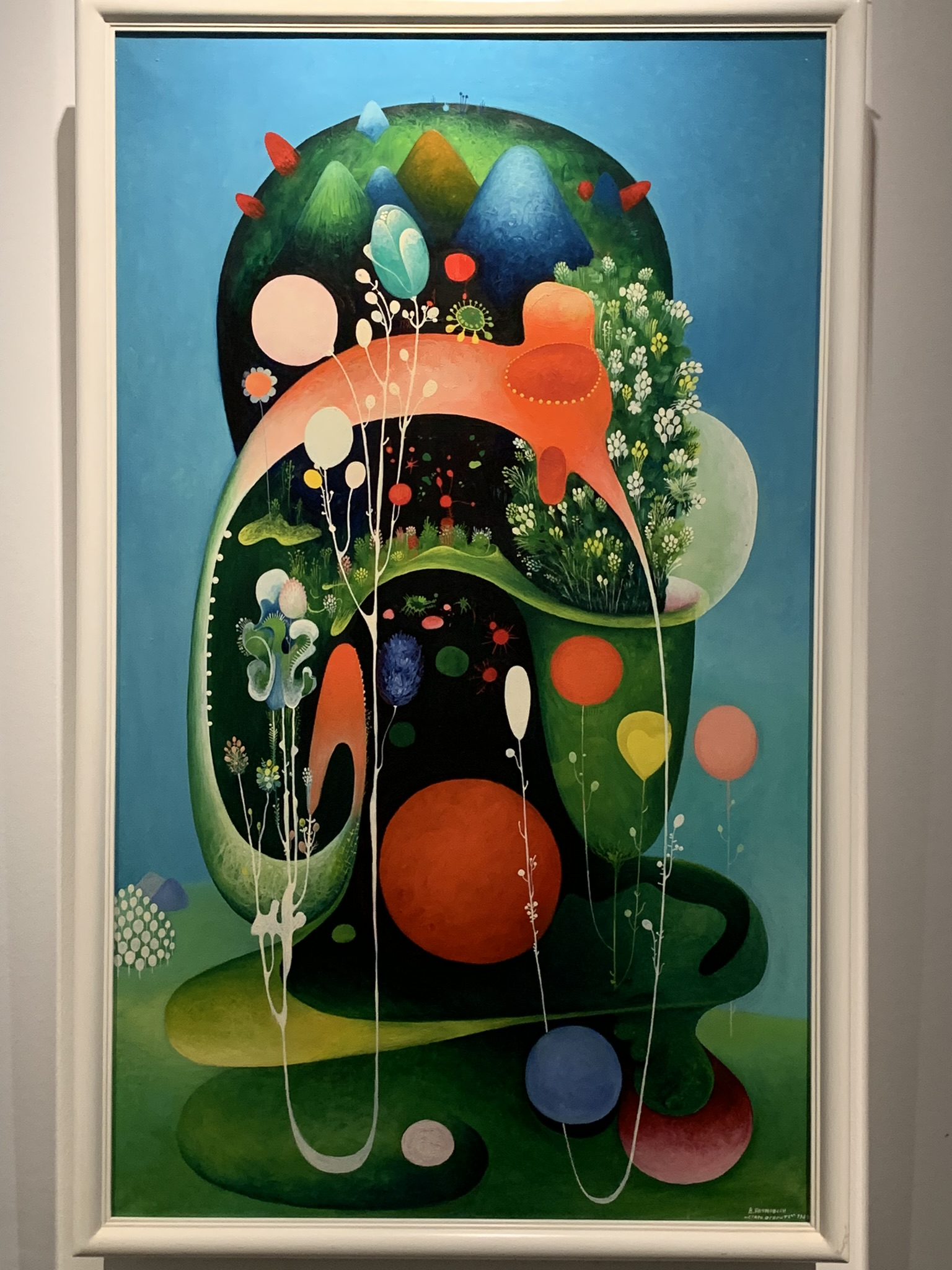

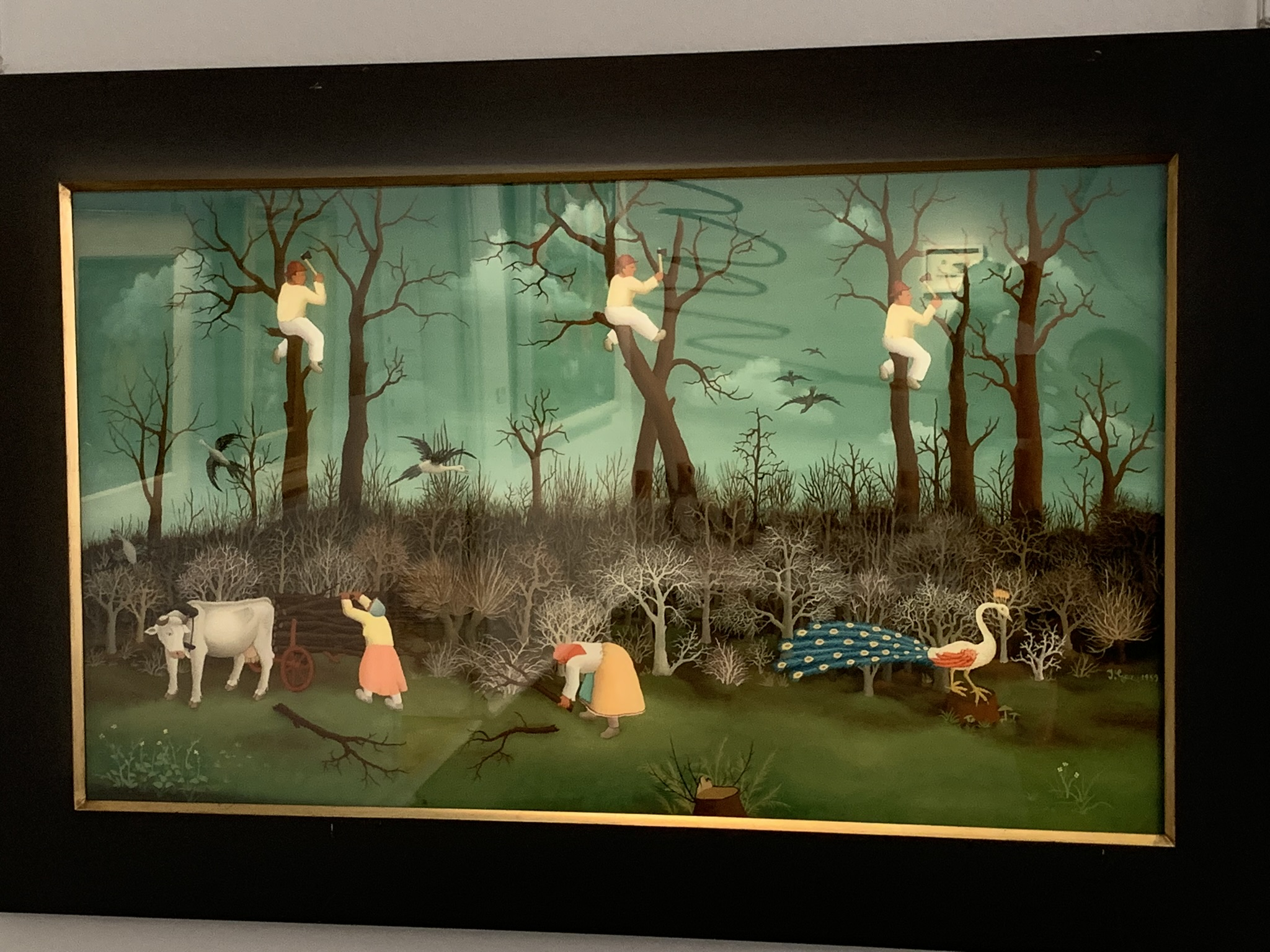

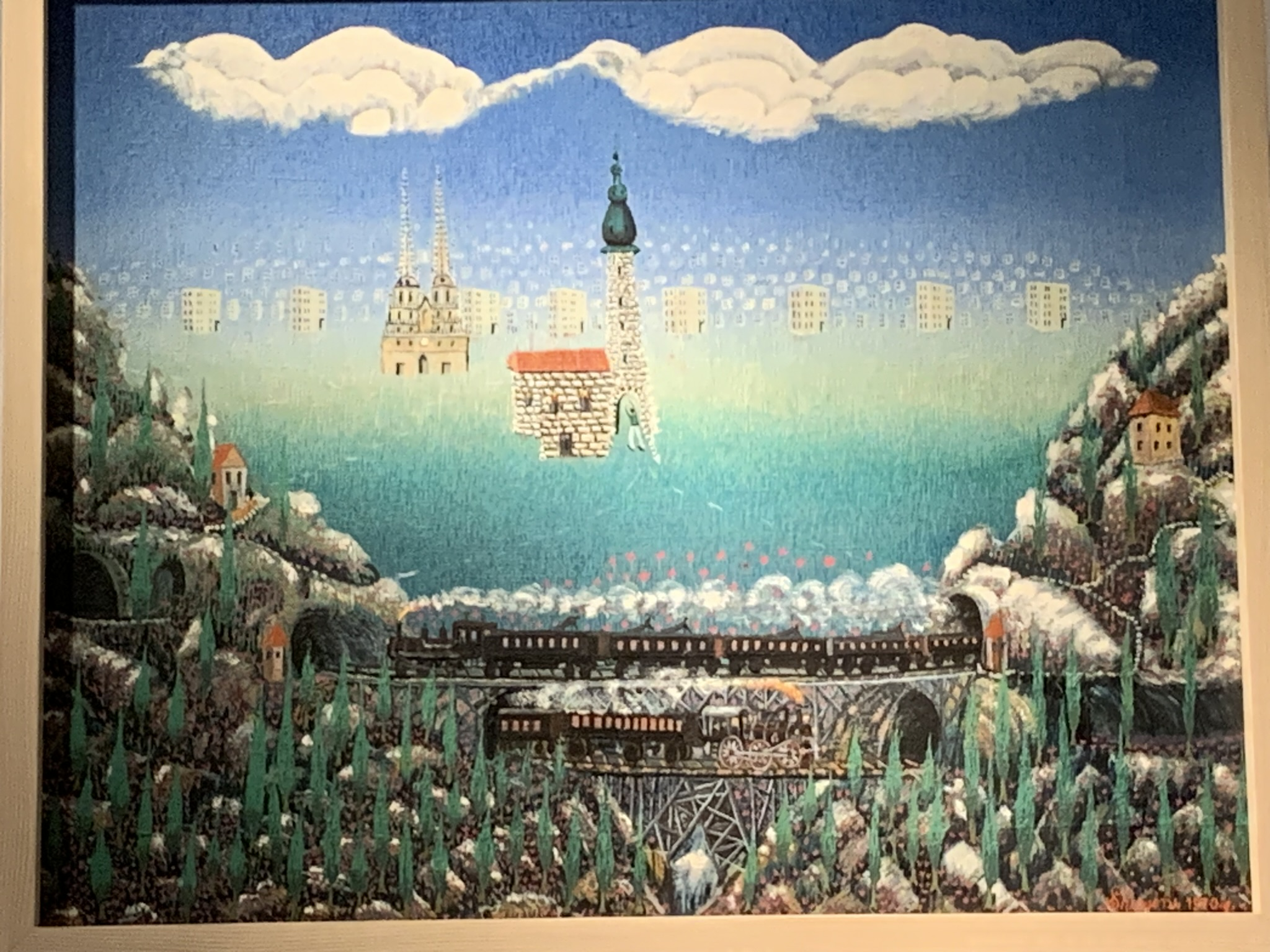

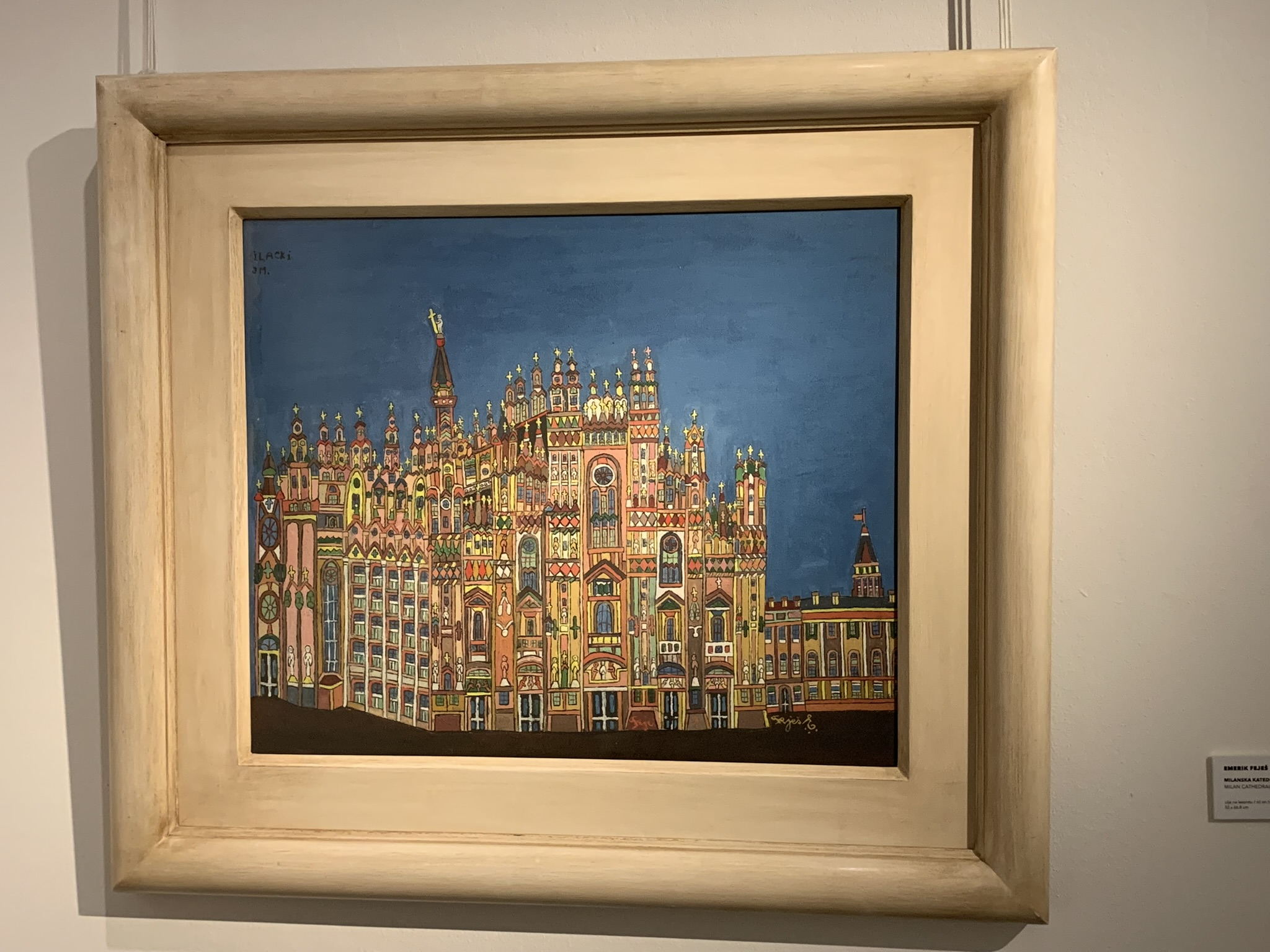

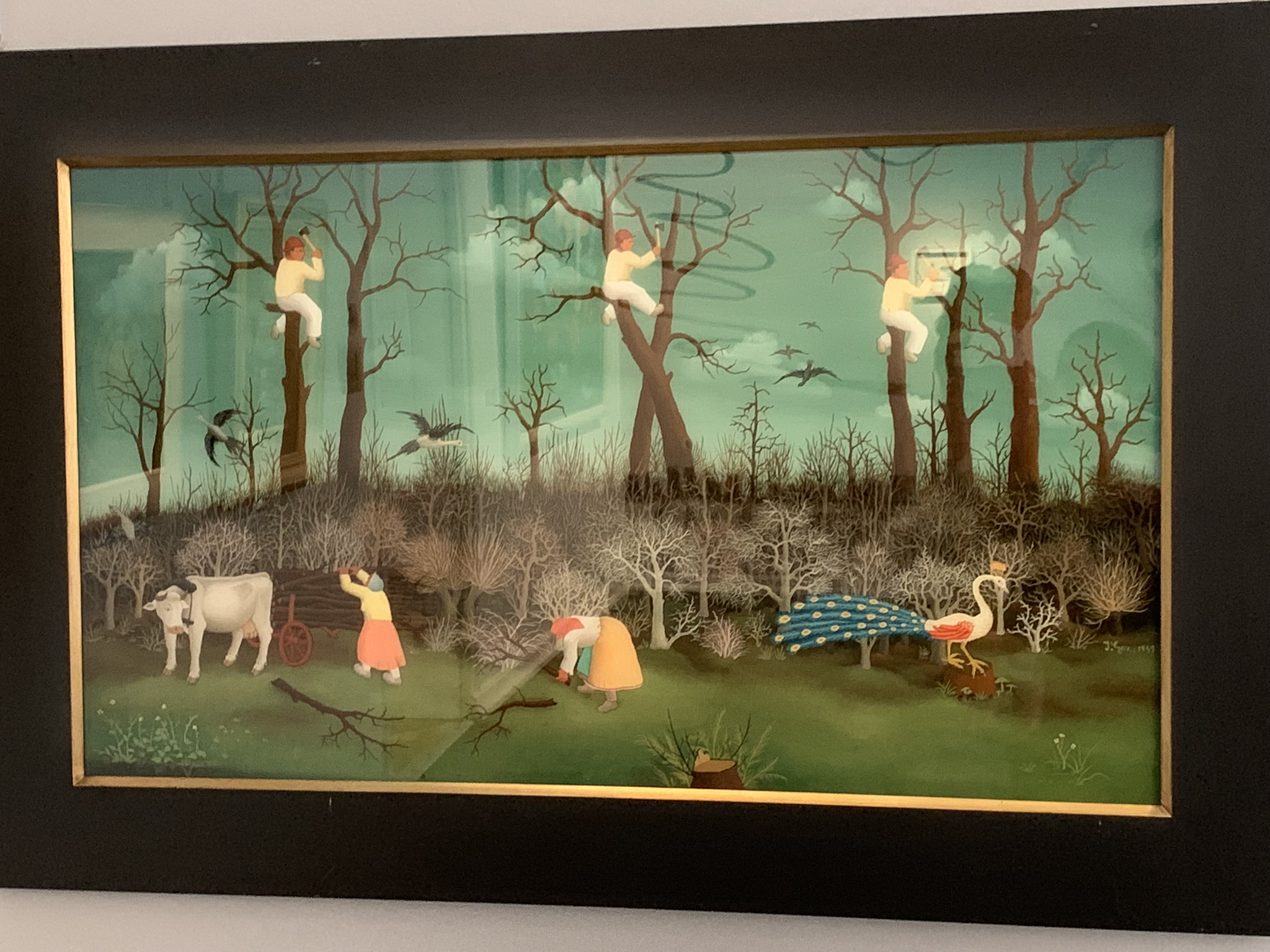

== See also ==
- Croatian art of the 20th century
- List of museums in Croatia
