= Mijo Kovačić =

Croatian painter (1935–2026)

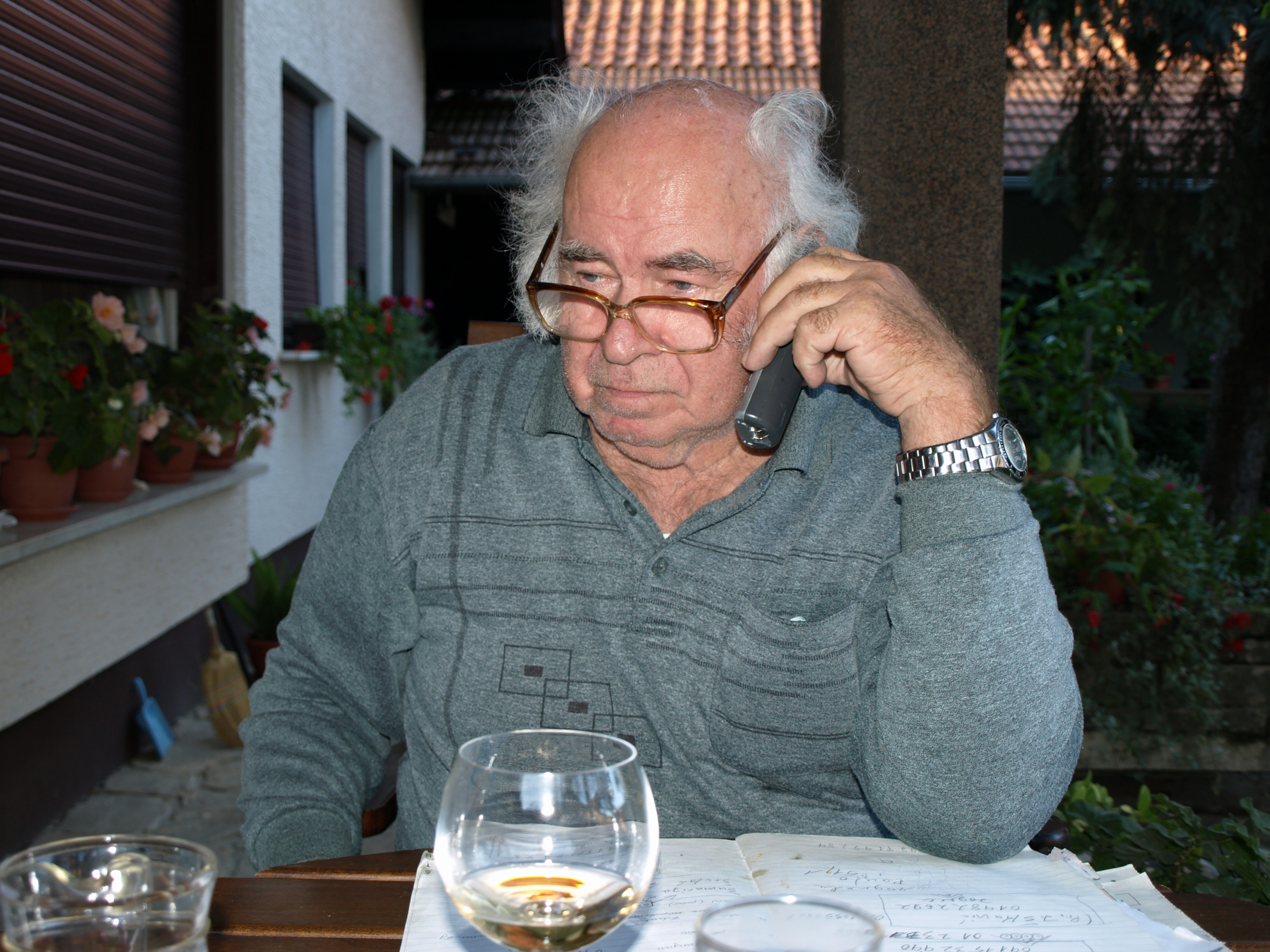
Mijo Kovačić in 2012

Mijo Kovačić (5 August 1935 – 22 April 2026) was a Croatian painter and naïve artist. His works can be found at the Croatian Museum of Naïve Art in Zagreb.

== Background ==
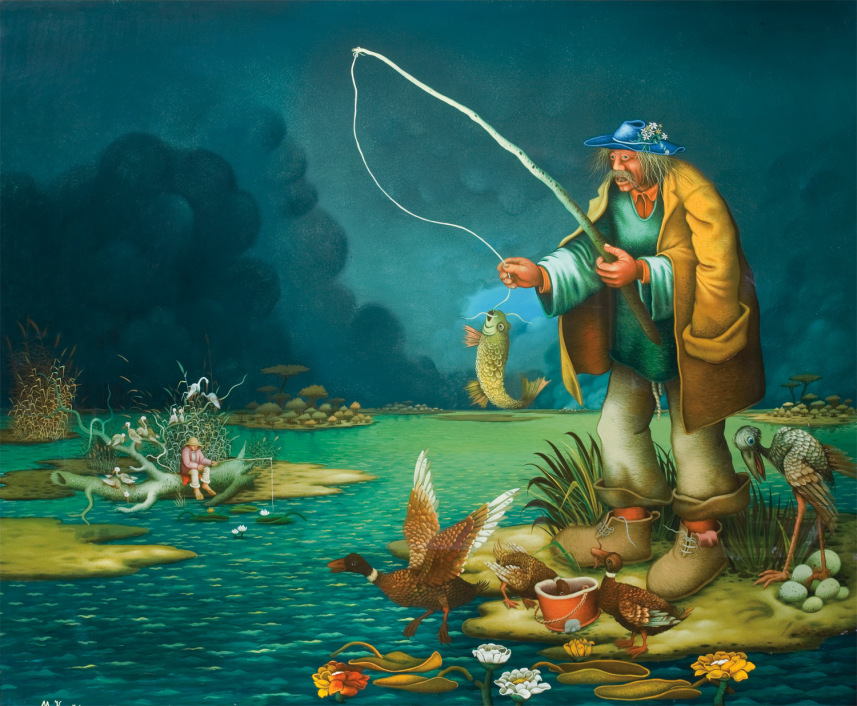
Gale over the Ditch (1976) by Mijo Kovačić

Kovačić was born in Gornja Šuma, Molve, in the Podravina region of Croatia. He spent his childhood painting and looking after the family cow, which became an important theme in his paintings. In 1953 at the age of eighteen he travelled to nearby Hlebine and met the Croatian painter Ivan Generalić, and a year later gave his first exhibition in Koprivnica. In 2018 a gallery devoted to his work opened in Koprivnica.

Kovačić died on 22 April 2026, at the age of 89.

== Work ==
The art of Mijo Kovačić is a late example of the Hlebine School of Croatian naïve art. His work often portrays rural wonderlands and the harsh peasant life of rural Croatia, described by academic and art critic Tonko Maroević as,

"With his memory he has evoked the rural environment almost unspoilt by civilisation, and his paintings renew the existential premises of action in limited, ‘untamed’ conditions of existence in a so-to-speak authentic natural setting. It has been said, and supported by many good reasons, that Kovačić’s painting are often of a medieval character, imbued with religion and mystique, inspired by apocalyptic suggestions and a Bosch-Bruegel-like narrative style."

Kovačić's work typically consists of oil on glass.
