= Matija Skurjeni =

Croatian painter

- Born: September 14, 1898; Veternica, Croatia
- Died: October 4, 1990 (aged 92); Zaprešić, Croatia
- Known for: Helped to create the Association of Independent Naïve Artists of Croatia
- Movement: Naive Art Movement

Matija Skurjeni (1898–1990) was a Croatian painter associated with the naïve art movement. He helped to found the Association of Independent Naïve Artists of Croatia and he is considered one of the most influential independent naïve artists. He has five rooms of his work at the Croatian Museum of Naïve Art and many of his works at the Matija Skurjeni Gallery in Zaprešić.

== Background ==
Skurjeni was born on September 14, 1898, in Veternica, Croatia. While he was still a boy, his father, who worked as a carpenter, died in an accident while felling a tree. As one of eight children, Skurjeni was forced to quit school at the age of seven to work as a shepherd in Veternica. He learned to read and write from his older siblings. At the age of twelve, Skurjeni found work building the Karlovac railways, but soon apprenticed a painter in Metlika. At the age of eighteen, Skurjeni served as a soldier in World War I on the Russian and Italian fronts. After one year of service, he was wounded at Castel Tessino. He served once more as a soldier from 1921 until 1922 when he contracted malaria. After serving in the army, Skurjeni worked as a miner on his land near Golubovec, but preferred his more artistic occupations. He therefore finished his apprenticeship in Metlika and moved to Zagreb, where he worked with the painters “Broz-Gubec-Zakošek.” In 1928, he was hired at the State Railways in Zagreb's workshop where he worked until retiring in 1956. In 1964, Skurjeni helped found the Association of Independent Naïve Artists of Croatia.

Skurjeni fell ill in 1975 and ceased painting. In 1984, he gave some of his paintings and sketches to the municipality of Zaprešić, building the foundation of the Matija Skurjeni Gallery. He died in Zaprešić on October 4, 1990.

== Artistic development ==
In 1924, Skurjeni commenced copying oleographs, making drawings on packing paper and coloring it with wall paint. These oleographs primarily contained religious images. At this time, Skurjeni was still considered a craftsman rather than a professional painter. In 1945, Skurjeni joined a Workers’ Cultural Society headed by Vinko Jeđut that hosted evening courses funded by its instructors. The classes, which lasted until 1949, sought to instruct individuals about formal artistic techniques and initiate artists to the socialist realist movement. Skurjeni's paintings from this time period certainly reflect the movement, including figures with a more regular and proportionate anatomy, such as oval shaped heads. The Cultural-Educational Societies of Zagreb's art sections considered Skurjeni's art too primitive, however, and it was never exhibited in their shows in the 1950s.

The Belgrade Exhibition Pavilion opened the first exhibit of Yugoslav naïve artists in 1957 in which Skurjeni's work “Zaprešićka rampa” (Zaprešić Ramp) appeared, thus launching him into the realm of professional artists. Skurjeni began to receive international recognition as he exhibited with Vinko Jeđut and other Yugoslav Railways employees. During the next several years Skurjeni forged a strong relationship with the Zagreb Gallery of Primitive Art and its director Dr. Mića Bašičević with whom he often collaborated.

From 1958, Skurjeni's style distinguished itself from other naïve painters through his paradigmatic work. In the early 1960s, Skurjeni associated with the avant-garde artists of Zagreb who called themselves the Gorgon. He participated in their first exhibition entitled “Salon G” and then continued to use the Gorgon motif throughout his career, including pieces such as: “Gorgon,” “In the Honor of the Gorgon,” and “The Gorgon Castle.” However, while associated with several avant-garde artists, Skurjeni's style never conformed to the movement.

== Style ==
Old Paris ("Stari Paris", oil on canvas, 1964) is on display in the Croatian Museum of Naïve Art in Zagreb.

Skurjeni is considered one of the most influential independent naïve artists, along with Ivan Rabuzin and Emerik Feješ. However, Skurjeni differs from many other naïve artists in that his work often focuses on the beyond through symbolism, metaphor and the inclusion of many fantastical elements. He concentrates less on physical spaces than many other naïve artists and hosts his paintings in a realm of imagination and dreams in a world he referred to as, “beyond the real.” His pictures often depict spatially and temporary separate actions converging in one tableau, especially in his studies. Nevertheless, many motifs from Skurjeni's own life appear in his work, such as trains, mines, the gorgon, ruins, gypsies, astronauts and landscapes from Zagorje. He paints the working world but according to his own deformed characteristics. Many of his motifs find links from his childhood and comment on political development.

== Exhibits ==
Skurjeni exhibited independently in Zagreb in 1958 and 1962, Belgrade and Novi Sad in 1959, Split in 1961 and Paris in 1962, Cologne in 1963, Zurich 1928, Frankfurt 1973, retrospective in Zlatar 1973, Milan 1978, Zapresic 1983 and 1987, Zagreb 1998, Zapresic 1998. He also received positive recognition in group exhibitions in Poland, South America, Italy, Sweden, Hungary and Germany, the United States. Skurjeni's work is housed in room five of the Croatian Museum of Naïve Art, where his pieces on display include, Roaming Athletes, 1960; Soccer Players, 1961; and My Homeland, 1960.

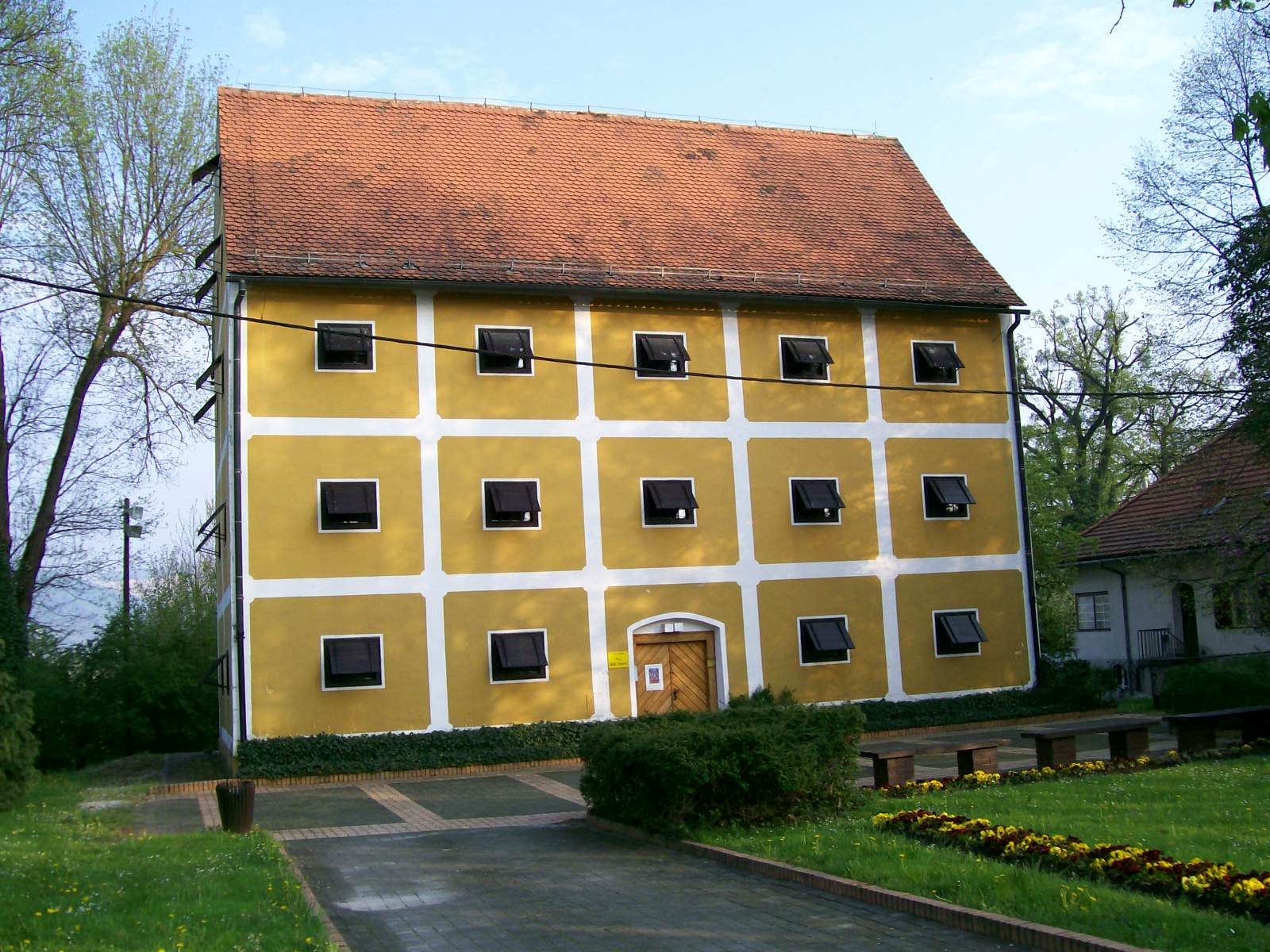
Matija Skurjeni Museum in Zaprešić

The first written plans for the Matija Skurjeni Gallery appeared on July 2, 1984, when Skurjeni and his collaborator Milka Kobešćak discussed donating several of his works to the municipality of Zaprešić. The Palace in Zaprešić opened the Matija Skurjeni Gallery July 15, 1987, proclaiming him an honorary citizen the same year. Up until 2000 the Gallery remained a part of the Brdovec Museum when, on November 20, the Minister of Culture announced the transition from the Matija Skurjeni Gallery to the Matija Skurjeni Museum after Kobešćak bequeathed upon her death her own collection of Skurjeni's works to the city of Zaprešić and the Skurjeni Gallery, leading the city to demand a more permanent exhibition space.
