= Willem van Genk =

Dutch painter

- van Genk in 1986
- Born: 2 April 1927; Voorburg, Netherlands
- Died: 12 May 2005 (aged 78)
- Movement: Outsider art

Willem van Genk (2 April 1927 – 12 May 2005) was a Dutch painter and graphic artist, celebrated as one of the leading masters of outsider art. Throughout his life he lived with severe mental distress, experiencing symptoms related to autism and schizophrenia. On account of his passion for trains, buses, and train stations, he called himself the "King of Stations".

Van Genk's panoramic cityscapes and fragmented collages express his feelings about modern authority, feelings which were shaped by an abusive father who, in addition to administering his own beatings, left him exposed to a traumatic experience at the hands of the Gestapo during the German occupation of the Netherlands in the Second World War.

Van Genk's art has been widely exhibited in Europe, where it is also in many museum collections, including those of the Stedelijk Museum, the Dr. Guislain Museum in Ghent, the Collection de l'Art Brut in Lausanne, the Lille Metropole Musee d'Art Modern, d'Art Contemporain et d'Art Brut (LaM), the Croatian Museum of Naïve Art in Zagreb, the Zander Collection in Cologne, and the Museum of Everything in London. Raw Vision, the leading magazine covering Art Brut, ranks van Genk among the "masters of outsider art". At the beginning of 2005, the year of the artist's death, van Genk's Keleti Station, now in the collection of the Museum of Everything in London, sold for a hundred thousand dollars at New York's Outsider Art Fair, thus setting the record for the most expensive work ever sold by a living outsider artist. On that occasion, Roberta Smith, the chief art critic of The New York Times, praised the piece "as the leading candidate for best in show". At least one other critic has identified van Genk as the most important Dutch outsider artist.

Willem van Genk: Mind Traffic, the first solo exhibition of the artist in the United States, was presented from 10 September through 30 November 2014, at the American Folk Art Museum in New York City.

== Life ==
=== Early years ===
Willem van Genk was born in 1927 in Voorburg, Netherlands. When he was five, his mother died, leaving the young boy dependent on his abusive father and, especially, his nine sisters. In school Willem was a poor student, except in art; playing to his strength, he preferred to doodle throughout the day instead of paying attention in class. He was especially weak in mathematics, which outraged his father, who forced Willem to add and subtract the number of blows as he beat him. Willem was expelled from primary school, and then failed at vocational school. He also began a sign-painting course, but did not finish it. These early failures and abuses fostered an inferiority complex, from which art was the only outlet. In art van Genk was exceptionally skilled, and he would use his skill to assume the perspective of a godlike overseer of the modern metropolis. During the Second World War, the Netherlands were occupied by Nazi Germany. Van Genk's father was a member of the Dutch resistance, and hid Jews in the family home. Their fate is not recorded in the literature on the artist. In 1944 when Willem was seventeen years old, the Gestapo visited the family apartment in the Magnoliastraat in search of the father, who was not there. In his stead Willem was interrogated by the Gestapo, who beat the adolescent, subjecting him, in the words of his eldest sister, to "a few heavy clouts." This trauma was the origin of van Genk's later obsession with long raincoats, as the Gestapo men on this occasion wore "high-buttoned leather jackets." This was a formative event in van Genk's life. As though appropriating their cloaks of power, van Genk would eventually collect hundreds of long raincoats, which he treated as a sort of fetish, a prophylactic protecting the paranoid artist against what he thought of as the ubiquitous threat of his enemies.

When van Genk's father married for a third time after the war, he threw his troubled son out of the house. Eventually, after years in a lodging house, van Genk moved in with his sister Willy in The Hague in 1964, and stayed put after her death in 1973, living alone for all but the end of the rest of his life in this modest dwelling in the Harmelenstraat.

=== Career ===
Willem van Genk originally pursued his talent as a draftsman in an advertising agency. He delivered work of good quality, but he was nonetheless fired, because he could not maintain a regular working schedule and abide deadlines. He also would spend hours observing trains during work time. After losing his job he was forced into menial work in a workhouse for the disabled. This compulsory labor was known as "labor for the inferior", a derogatory term which haunted the artist the rest of his life. Van Genk told his friend Dick Walda: "I have never gotten over it, I think. Being labelled as 'inferior'. The bosses there make sure you know about it. They're more like concentration camp bullies than bosses." The experience was degrading, and van Genk took it as justification for his paranoia. At this time he first received help for his mental problems, but thereafter he still often had paranoid episodes and heard unreal voices. In the year 1958 he registered with the Royal Academy in The Hague. The director Joop Beljon recognized immediately the quality of his work, but also that the young artist was beyond the reach of the faculty's lessons. At the director's suggestion van Genk was allowed to take his own path at the academy, and consequently he remained an autodidact. At this time van Genk was noticed for the first time, with the journalist R.E. Penning praising his work as "panoramas of Lilliput towns as seen by Gulliver."

In 1964, Beljon organized the first solo exhibition of van Genk's work in Hilversum. The Dutch writer W.F. Hermans opened the show and commented that his works "are frighteningly beautiful, but they will remind many of something they would rather forget." But high prices meant few sales, and mixed publicity, some of which insulted the artist's mental capacities, partly motivated van Genk's withdrawal from this early public attention. Furthermore, he was his own harshest critic, unable to bear the sound of his recorded voice. A television interview to publicize the exhibition so horrified the artist that for decades he refused to be filmed, photographed, or taped. Van Genk's inferiority complex was thus a major impediment to the development of his career as an artist.

Van Genk withdrew from publicity, but continued to work and exhibit. In 1966 eight works sold at a show by the Galerie Alfred Schmela in Düsseldorf; notably, the prestigious Stedelijk Museum, Amsterdam's museum of modern art, bought van Genk's painting Metrostation Opera. With his successes in the mid-1960s, van Genk was finally able to indulge his passionate interest in cities by visiting them in person. His art through 1960 was devoted to relatively straightforward panoramic depictions of cityscapes, views that the artist culled from the printed material he perused, such as travel guides, postcards, and magazines. Now he visited many cities, including Stockholm, Madrid, Rome, Moscow, Budapest, Frankfurt, and wall-divided Berlin. Landmark architecture from these cities, especially train stations, feature in many works by the artist.

In the 1970s van Genk's career as an artist continued with modest success. He was included at the Düsseldorf IKI art fair in 1974, but nothing of his sold. Initially represented by Pieter Brattinga, by the 1970s van Genk was represented by the gallery De Ark. The gallery's last show in 1976 before being taken over by the Hamer Gallery, which continued to represent the artist, was devoted to van Genk's work. Also in 1976 van Genk was included in two group shows devoted to "naïve" art, in Amsterdam and Haarlem respectively. He was included in Nederlandse Naieve Kunst ("Dutch Naïve Art"), a volume surveying fourteen figures, with van Genk's work represented by three color reproductions. In the 1980s van Genk achieved a new height of international recognition. In 1984 he was included in the World Encyclopedia of Naïve Art, with almost a full-page reproduction of his painting Madrid, which the Collection de l'Art Brut in Lausanne acquired the same year along with a second work, "50 Years of the Soviet Union," for "2,500 and 3,000 guilders respectively," relatively modest sums which angered the artist against his dealer Nico Van Der Endt. The following year the Collection de l'Art Brut acquired three works on paper by the artist, marking a commitment to represent his work in depth that culminated in a major exhibition of the museum's collection in 1986, which "establishe(d) Van Genk's international reputation." The show was a critical success in the Francophone lands of Europe, and London's prestigious Southbank Centre responded to the show by borrowing three works by van Genk for a travelling exhibition called "In Another World," which toured across Britain.

=== Final years and death ===
Now with his reputation securely established, van Genk's prices continued to rise while his works continued to be exhibited, both in several group exhibitions and no less than four monographic exhibitions just in the 1990s. Yet this burgeoning success did not satisfy van Genk's wish to live a normal life. By 1995 he was becoming increasingly withdrawn, a recluse holed up in his apartment, where he was the subject of many complaints from his neighbors, who objected to the awful smells and loud nocturnal "thumping" emanating therefrom. The following year in 1996 van Genk was involuntarily seized by the police from his Hague apartment and committed to a sanatorium. A police officer commented to van Genk's dealer, Nico van der Endt, whom the artist had desperately summoned to the scene: "We know all about Mr Van Genk. His file's a metre thick." The floor of the apartment was found "almost entirely covered with a thin layer of dog faeces, stamped thin and dried out." The authorities killed van Genk's dog Coco, who was evidently not housebroken. After three months, van Genk was released and allowed to return home, but his apartment, which had been such a peculiar live-in Gesamtkunstwerk, had been drastically transformed by cleaning, to the violated artist's chagrin. Not long thereafter, the police again involuntarily seized van Genk, who was placed under 'compulsory psychiatric treatment for a maximum of six months because he was charged for the "nuisance caused to neighbors."' The approbation of the art world had not entailed the wider social acceptance of this troubled, difficult figure.

The year after his involuntary commitment, he suffered a first stroke. That same year, 1997, the artist made his last drawing, thus closing his career as an artist. That year also saw the publication of the first monographic account of the artist's career, Dick Walda's book Koning der stations, along with the preparation of another monographic catalogue to accompany a retrospective exhibition, Ans Van Berkum's Willem van Genk: A Marked Man and his World. The retrospective exhibition that Van Berkum's monograph accompanied opened at De Stadshof (now defunct) in Zwolle the following year in 1998, then travelled to Bönnigheim and Lausanne. But before this exhibition opened, van Genk suffered another stroke while travelling in Stockholm; this would be the last of his travels. In 1998, as the De Stadshof Museum was negotiating the purchase of ten works by Willem van Genk for the impressive sum of 225,000 guilders (in anticipation of the retrospective exhibition and book publication), the artist himself was committed to a nursing home. Months before the artist's death of heart failure in 2005, his picture Keleti Station sold for $100,000, which made the moribund artist "the most expensive living outsider artist."

== Trauma and mental illness ==
Van Genk's life and work is of special interest to those fascinated by the relationship between mental illness and artistic creativity. Like other famous outsider artists such as Adolf Wölfli and Martín Ramírez, van Genk had from extreme mental distress. Ever since the early 1920s, when Hans Prinzhorn published his study on The Artistry of the Mentally Ill (which was quickly adopted as an inspiration by the Surrealists in Paris), the artwork of the mentally ill has been a topic of considerable interests to artists, scholars, and the public at large. Yet this history is as marred by invidious classifications as it is marked by uplifting respect for the creativity of suffering eccentrics. Van Genk himself was notably interested in this subject, which he experienced as an insulting challenge to his existence as an artist. He owned Johannes H. Plokker's Art from the Mentally Disturbed: The Shattered Vision of Schizophrenics in no fewer than three languages. In his rather polemical study Plokker denies the ability of the mentally ill to make real art, which Plokker argues presupposes an "integrated personality." The severity of this judgment, which takes refuge in incredibly neat distinctions between the sick and healthy, goaded van Genk on, worsening his persecution complex yet motivating him to disprove his enemies by creating his art.

Willem van Genk had symptoms related to autism and paranoid schizophrenia. Even before his traumatic adolescent incident at the hands of the Gestapo, young Willem had great difficulty learning in certain subjects, yet some perceived his remarkably tangled talent. Then the experience with the Gestapo, compounded by abuse from his father, contributed to a lifelong paranoia, which in turn became a defining characteristic of his art. Van Genk's fear of authority was arguably at least partly justified by traumas inflicted upon him: childhood abuse by his father and the Gestapo, involuntary servitude in a workhouse for the mentally disabled as a young adult, then ultimately his two arrests and involuntary commitments to psychiatric care as an old man. But if he had good reason to feel himself persecuted by powerful figures and bureaucracies, the consequence was undeniably a maladjusted, antisocial paranoia, such that, to cite the most striking example, his apartment was discovered carpeted by a layer of dog excrement.

The artist had a variety of symptoms. He repeatedly confessed to hearing unreal voices—a classic symptom of schizophrenia. He was quite lonely, once telling his dealer Nico Van Der Endt, whom he addressed in the third person, "Nico Van Der Endt is the most solid comrade I've got, and that's purely on a commercial basis." He also had a hoarding compulsion, in evidence not only in his obsessive collecting of raincoats (eventually numbering in the hundreds) but also in his reluctance to part with his own work.

== Sexuality ==
The artist also had sexual anxieties: in 1987 he complained that the proliferation of hair salons across The Hague was "restricting his freedom of movement. The sight of long hair in frothy shampoo arouse(d) sexual feelings that he ha(d) difficulty keeping under control..." The following year in 1988 van Genk made a painting called The Hairdresser's Salon, a composite image divided by a grid into 32 equally sized squares, with macabre imagery suggesting, in conjunction with his revealing comment, a fear of women.

Van Genk's sexual frustration was variously expressed. In 1980 he commented: "If they take my dog away, I'll molest the little boys." Later he complained, "You're discriminated against because you don't have a little lady friend, they think you're a fairy, there are two gays living in my street, and the thing is, they look down at you too, you can't expect anything from them either." Prompted by such comments, as well as the inscription '"Artistic" homosexual in the Ark' (originally in Dutch, '"Artistieke' homophiel in de Ark') in van Genk's Self-portrait in the Ark ("Zelfportrait in de Ark"), Van Der Endt confronted the artist: "So you're a homosexual?" The artist replied, "No, no, that was a mistake." Whatever the mystery of Van Genk's desire really was, it was not resolved in his lifetime. Nico Van Der Endt suggests that the artist's libido was displaced onto fetish objects, and that van Genk was especially "aroused" by trains and raincoats. Van Der Endt has also made the related suggestion that van Genk's work is loaded with sexual subtexts: trains and zeppelins as phallic symbols of potency, raincoats as condom-like prophylactics, and more. This sexualized reading, though it may indeed clarify the artist's confused and frustrated feelings, is inadequate as an explanation of the artist's conscious intentions. Van Der Endt himself explicitly allows that it is "impossible to offer one comprehensive interpretation," but claims that essentially "his work is concerned with order, power and impotence."

== Reputation as outsider ==
Van Genk occupies a paradoxical position as one of the official masters of outsider art. Raw Vision, the leading magazine devoted to the subject, has twice included van Genk on its list of masters, and the artist has been the subject of considerable attention from European museums devoted to outsider art/art brut. In 2014 was the subject of an exhibition at the American Folk Art Museum, the leading American museum in this field.

Van Genk the man was certainly an outsider, with his mental difficulties resulting in his social marginalization. As a boy he repeatedly failed in schools, as a young man he was forced into compulsory labor for the disabled, and as an old man he was at least twice involuntarily committed to psychiatric institutions. He complained of his friendlessness. In the straightforward, common sense of the word, there can be no denying that, as a person, van Genk was an outsider.

Yet his status as an outsider artist was questioned by the Los Angeles County Museum of Art (LACMA) on the occasion of its survey exhibition "Parallel Visions" in 1992, when the museum held van Genk's partial success in achieving official recognition against him. Van Genk, with his hoarding compulsion, hated to part with his work: one monograph claims that he felt parting with a painting was like having a limb amputated. Yet he also desired official recognition, so his dealer devised a strategy of dissemination whereby, on the rare occasion when the dealer was allowed to sell a work, it was invariably to a museum. According to LACMA this strategic dissemination of works to museums, in order to maintain a minimal livelihood for the artist and elevate his status, violated "a basic criterion: outsider art must not be created for the public." If accepted, however, this exclusion would place van Genk outside any clear categorization as an artist. Furthermore, it was only the paintings and drawings which were made with the idea of public exhibition in mind: the trolleybuses and raincoat hoard were, on the contrary, private projects, qualifying as outsider art even in accordance with LACMA's exclusive definition.

== Work ==
=== Genres ===
Art historians have distinguished four categories within van Genk's work:

- approximately 100 drawings and paintings
- his installation "Bahnhof Arnheim" and his collection of self-made trolleybuses
- his collection of raincoats
- his library

This scheme, including non-traditional art objects, is premised on the notion that the artist's life was itself an artwork, a notion current at the time through the legacy of Marcel Duchamp, the work of Joseph Beuys, the rise of performance art, etc. However, the artist's dealer Nico Van Der Endt disapproved of this classification, writing in his Chronicle: "I am not comfortable with the idea of exhibiting the raincoats, which are not art objects." It is likewise unconventional to classify a library as a work of art, although it is common for art historians to consider an artist's books in order to reconstruct the artist's thought and possible source material.

==== Paintings and drawings ====
Willem van Genk made around 100 paintings, collages, and drawings, most of which feature cityscapes. These works are usually big ("between one and two metres wide") and the product of extensive labor ("he tended to work on each one for a couple of years"). There are about 80 paintings/collages, "five monochrome etchings," and finally a number of large ballpoint drawings that constitute the artist's late work. Through 1960, the images were relatively traditional, panoramic depictions of European metropolises, with an especial emphasis on transportation: trains and train stations, zeppelins, trolleybuses, etc. Later in the artist's career he adopted a modernist syntax of fragmentation, often cutting up pictures and recombining them in composite images distinguished by a jumpy, visual staccato. Several "painted boards or sheets of different sizes, put and held together with small nails and tape" were thus brought together to constitute a single composite work. While this montage technique of composition is by no means unique either to van Genk or artists struggling with debilitating mental illness (Willem de Kooning, for example, did something similar), in his case it is especially suggestive, as this fragmented syntax may be thought to parallel the symptoms of schizophrenia.

The artist incorporated images from other visual media into his collages: advertising copy, waste materials, and cuts of paper from travel brochures and history books. His work has an obsessive, cacophonous character that parallels the overwhelming scale and abrupt juxtapositions of the modern city. Titles and headlines were used as a commentary within the composite image. Composing with the different elements of the modern metropolis, the artist assumed a position of mastery, as if exercising an omnipotent supervision over the city and all its economic, social, and political processes.

==== Raincoats ====
Willem van Genk's fascination with long raincoats may be traced directly to the traumatic experience of his youth, when he was mistreated by the Gestapo, the men of which are recorded to have worn long leather jackets on the occasion. Van Genk incessantly collected long jackets, mostly of cheap plastic, eventually filling his apartment with hundreds. Van Genk seems to have treated these raincoats as fetishes endowed with sexual and defensive power. It seems as though van Genk thought that the Gestapo's power to harm was an emanation of their costumes, and that he sought to protect himself from the dangers of the world by appropriating their outerwear. Raincoats also appear as images in his paintings.

The collection of raincoats, eventually numbering in the hundreds, is the prime example of van Genk's hoarding fetish. The artist explained, "I once discarded a raincoat, and looking back, I regret that." When Van Gank was arrested and institutionalized and his apartment cleared in 1998, dozens of raincoats were removed. As noted above (see "Genres"), the classification of van Genk's hoard of raincoats as works of art is controversial, and was not accepted by his dealer Nico Van Der Endt. Yet the raincoats entered the collection of the Museum De Stadshof in Zwolle at the initiative of Ans Van Berkum, and were interpreted as an integral part of van Genk's oeuvre in her 1998 monograph on the artist. The jackets have subsequently been included in exhibitions on the artist.

==== The Arnheim Bus Station Installation ====
Beginning in the 1980s, van Genk made nearly 70 miniature trolleybuses, constructing these toy-like models "out of plate material and selected waste material." These trolleybuses were the constituent parts of a bigger installation of the Arnheim Bus Station that gradually colonized the living room of van Genk's apartment.

==== Library ====
In an essay on van Genk's library, Patrick Allegaert and Bart Marius repeatedly suggest that it should be considered an integral part of van Genk's artistic oeuvre. Van Genk read widely in at least three languages, with fluency in German and English as well as Dutch. His library housed books on many subjects reflecting his wide-ranging interests: "general art history, music history, art brut and naive art, Soviet Russian aviation, trains, buses, trams, sexuality, countries and cities, world history..." Allegaert and Marius note that there were no books on psychiatry in van Genk's library. Although Allegaert and Marius argue for the exceptional import of van Genk's library, claiming that "it is part of his artistic production", they only show how van Genk used his library as source material, an image bank to draw on and transform in his drawings, paintings, and collages: "And herein lies the importance of his library", they write. "The realism and accurateness of his work were made possible thanks to the visual memory bank to which van Genk had access in his books." It is not uncommon, however, for artists to use books as source material. What is uncommon is to consider the source material part of the artistic production.

=== Themes and meaning ===
Cityscapes predominate as the main subject of van Genk's work, and within the city he was especially drawn to transport sites. For this latter reason he referred to himself as "King of Stations." This title, designating a ruler, points to the theme of power, which has assumed a singular importance in the literature on the artist. As a consequence of various events in his life, the artist was acutely sensitive to power and powerlessness. While he fancied himself the all-powerful "King of Stations," he was really an outsider, disabled and powerless, who felt himself attacked from all sides. Abused as a child by his father and as an adolescent by the Gestapo, subjected to compulsory labor as a young man (an experience he compared to being bullied in a concentration camp), and involuntarily seized on two occasions by the police in old age, Willem van Genk was as much a victim of external forces as he was of his own inner compulsions.

The 1944 incident with the Gestapo must have been especially terrifying in van Genk's case, since the Nazis were killing mentally disabled people like him starting in October 1939. The Gestapo incident was the origin of van Genk's obsessive raincoat fetish, with the artist appropriating the long jackets worn by the Gestapo in order to project an image of powerfulness and defend himself against enemies, real and imagined. Although this is the clearest case of the abuse of power translated into van Genk's art, this theme permeates his work.

Van Genk's life and work are both of a piece, with the art created in a desperate attempt to gain some autonomous control over his repeatedly violated life. In his panoramic images of cities, in Nico Van Der Endt's words, van Genk "is like a master architect wielding his power over the entire city." In other words, these images are megalomaniacal fantasies at odds with the dominated circumstances of the artist's life. By the 1960s, however, the artist had achieved enough freedom to indulge his passion for travel after years of dreaming about foreign cities. van Genk's enthusiasm for travel is clearly reflected in his images of various cities.

Nico Van Der Endt has suggested that van Genk's art encodes a sexual symbolism, with trains, buses, and zeppelins as phallic symbols of power and the raincoats as condom-like wrappers. "The image of the locomotive," he writes, "has an unmistakably sexual import: a powerful, gleaming black monster with fire inside, pumping its pistons and ejaculating hot, white steam." Van Genk, with abundant personal reasons to hate and fear Fascism, initially admired Communism as its putative opposite. In his art there are many depictions of Moscow, which reflect this early sympathy for Soviet Communism. As van Genk's longtime dealer, Nico van der Endt, has related, van Genk "saw Moscow as the capital city of the world's wretched outcasts. Even so, van Genk, like many others, ultimately lost all his faith in the political left, and in politics altogether. 'Every culture discriminates', he once said." A painting of Prague from the mid-1970s, by its reference to the socialist reformer Alexander Dubček, suggests that the violent Soviet suppression of the Prague Spring in 1968 was decisive in van Genk's disavowal of communism. Thereafter the artist most admired the social democracies of Scandinavia. His last trip was to Stockholm, where he suffered his debilitating second stroke in 1997. When Nico Van Der Endt, who became the artist's dealer and closest associate, first encountered the work, he thought it was inimitable, before remembering Kafka's The Trial: "A tightly packed, teeming, and gloomy cityscape. I could not get over it. I had never seen anything like it before. I could not compare it to anything else. Yes, Kafka. The Trial. That is the first thing that I thought of."
