= Mirko Virius =

Croatian painter (1889–1943)

- Born: October 28, 1889; Đelekovec, Austria-Hungary
- Died: 1943 (aged 53 or 54); Zemun, Independent State of Croatia
- Known for: Painting

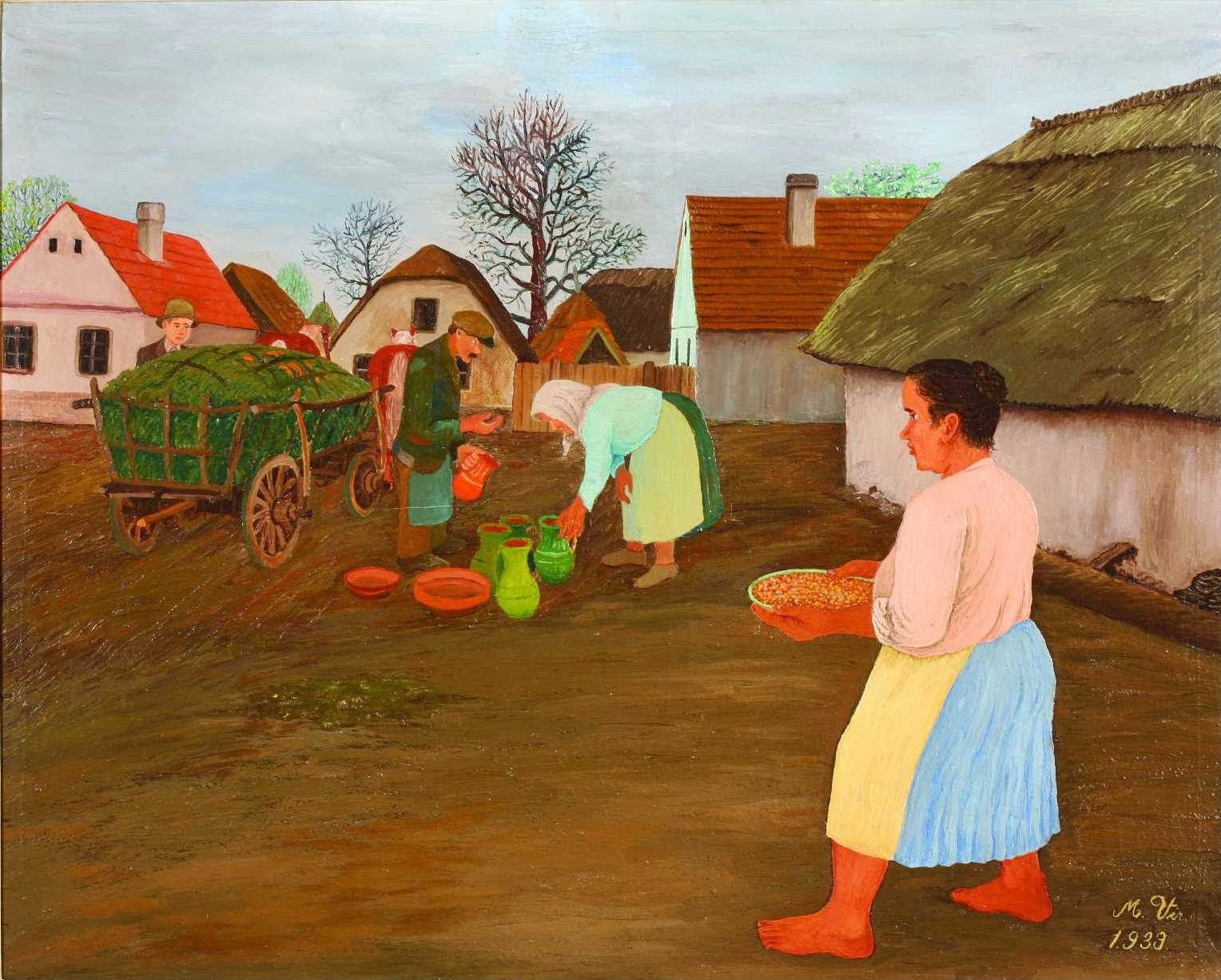
Potter in the Village (1939)

Mirko Virius (28 October 1889 – 1943) was a Croatian naïve painter. He was one of the three most prominent members of the first generation of the Hlebine School.

Virius was born in the village of Đelekovec near Koprivnica, where he completed four years of primary school. In the First World War, he fought as an Austro-Hungarian soldier in Galicia. He was captured by Russians and made a forced laborer in Kiev, Kharkiv and the Ekaterinoslav iron plant.

He returned from Russia in the spring of 1918 and remained in Zagreb until the war ended. Virius then went home to Đelekovec, where he lived in penury and married a war widow with two children. He became a member of the progressive peasant movement, led by the Croatian Peasant Party. In 1936, the writer Mihovil Pavlek Miškina introduced him to the painters from Hlebine, Ivan Generalić and Franjo Mraz. They were the first generation of the Croatian naïve art movement, the Hlebine School.

Virius was a self-taught painter, who started painting late in life. In just three years (1936–39) he created an impressive body of work. He participated in the First Exhibition of Peasant Painters in Zagreb. Virius started with drawings and later made watercolors and oils. His opus is dominated by expressive and bleak depictions of social themes - peasant labor, the soil, poor villagers - best shown in paintings such as The Beggar, The Plowing, The Red Bull, The Overturned Cart, The Flour Exchange Office. The prominent lines, the purity and elegance of his drawings prompted the critic Josip Depolo to call him "the Giotto of Podravina". i. e. the conscience of croatian painting and modernity.

In the Second World War, Virius was arrested because of his Communist political activities and taken to a Nazi concentration camp in Zemun, where he was executed in 1943. His tragic fate was immortalized by his friend Generalić, who painted The Death of Virius, one of his most famous paintings.

Works of Virius are part of the collections of the Croatian Museum of Naïve Art in Zagreb, the Museum of Contemporary Art Zagreb and the Zander Collection in Cologne.

== Sources ==
- Zdelar, Željka (2006). "Mirko Virius - život i djelo između dva sužanjstva" (PDF). Podravski zbornik (in Croatian) (32): 109–112.
