= Sofija Naletilić Penavuša =

Croatian naïve sculptor

Sofija Naletilić 'Penavuša' (6 January 1913 – 22 June 1994) was a Croatian naïve sculptor from Herzegovina.

== Early life ==
Sofija Penavić was born in the village of Mokro, and never went to school. She did not attend any art schools or creative courses. In 1942 she lost her husband Marijan Naletilić, and had to care for six children, in poverty. In 1976, she lost one of her children. Her art helped her to deal with the tragedy.

== Work ==
She was discovered by art critic and writer Dubravko Horvatić. She had her first solo exhibition in 1982 in Zagreb in a private gallery Schira at age 69 . The most valuable and numerous part of the author's oeuvre is her "bestiary" – sculptures of simplified and stylized animals shaped and painted with a touch of mysticism and dreaminess.

In 1985, Naletilić was named person of the year in a survey by Start magazine.

Overall she produced over 7,000 sculptures.

== Legacy ==
In 1994, Naletilić posthumously received the Grand Prix of the international jury at the World Triennial of Naive Art Insita 94 at the Slovak National Gallery in Bratislava.

In 2001, a monograph about Sofija Naletilić Penavuša, Prayed Sculptures, was published by Gral Široki Brijeg and Art Studio Azinović. In 2005, the Croatian Museum of Naïve Art held an exhibition of Naletilić's work.

On the occasion of the 110th anniversary of the birth of Sofija Naletilić Penavuša, in 2023, the Franciscan Museum and Gallery in Široki Brijeg had an exhibition of thirty-four sculptures from its own holdings. The 2024 edition of the theatre festival Mostar Spring, organized by Matica hrvatska, began with an exhibition of works by Sofija Naletilić.
