= Dragan Gaži =

Croatian painter

Dragan Gaži (c. 5 July 1930 – 23 June 1983) was a Croatian naive painter.

== Biography ==
Gaži belonged to the second generation of painters of the Hlebine School. He was born into a peasant family in Hlebine; his father, Franjo Gaži, was a farmer, and his mother, Roza, was née Cuki. He attended elementary school in Hlebine, completing four grades. His artistic output can be divided into three phases.

In the first phase (1946–1953), he received instruction from Ivan Generalić and became acquainted with Krsto Hegedušić. During this period he drew with pencil and ink and made watercolours. In 1949 he exhibited publicly for the first time, in Zagreb, at the Seljačka sloga (Peasant Concord) exhibition.

The second phase (1954–1966) was realistic-veristic-expressionistic in character; he painted portraits and scenes from everyday life. He painted little, only in his free time, mostly in winter when there was less work on the land and in the household. In 1954 he married Barica, née Gabaj, and used money from her dowry to buy his first paints, producing his first paintings on glass. In 1961 he exhibited abroad for the first time. He held his first solo exhibition in 1964 at the Art Studio of the Cabinet of Graphic Arts (Likovni studio kabineta grafike) in Zagreb, and his first solo exhibition abroad in 1966 at the Galerie Carrol in Munich.

The third phase began in 1967, bringing changes in composition and subject matter and the beginnings of an idealization of scenes. He devoted himself increasingly to painting and less to farming. In 1969 the first significant catalogue of his work and a first small monograph were published.

His younger brother, Branko Gaži, was a naive sculptor. His works can be found at the Croatian Museum of Naïve Art in Zagreb.

== Selected works ==
- Basket Weavers in Winter (1966)
- Harvest in the Forest (1968)
- Lunch in the Field (1971)
- Fair (1973)
- Winter (1969)
- Fire (1972)
- Wind (1973)
- Portrait of Mato Bujina (1959)
- Dead Father (1966)
- Old Filip (1967)
