= Ivan Lacković Croata =

Croatian naive painter (1932–2004)

Ivan Lacković Croata (January 1, 1932 – August 29, 2004) was a Croatian naive painter.

Lacković was born to a peasant family in the village of Batinske near Kalinovac. After completing his primary education, he worked as a laborer in fields and forests. This self-taught painter made his first watercolors, depicting village life, in 1944. He drew his first drawings in 1952.

Lacković moved to Kloštar Podravski in 1954. He spent three years there, painting his first oils. Then he moved to Zagreb, where he worked as a mailman and post office worker. In 1962 he met Krsto Hegedušić and occasionally worked in his master workshop. His first one-man exhibition in the HAZU Cabinet of Graphics in 1964 established his reputation as a masterful draftsman. He left the post office job in 1968 and became a professional painter.

He painted poetic scenes from his native region of Podravina in tempera and oil on glass (a traditional technique of the naive artists from north Croatia), while turning increasingly to the medium of drawing. Detailed winter scenes prevail in his early works. In the 1970s, he turned towards allegory, symbolism and the fantastic. The atmosphere of his paintings is lyrical and surreal.

He most frequently drew landscapes, figurative compositions, flowers and still lives. Portraits are very rare. He illustrated many books of prose and poetry.

Lacković had more than a hundred one-man exhibitions at home and abroad (Cologne, Zurich, Paris, Bremen, Laval, Münster, Turin, Rome, Caracas, Milan, Hague, São Paulo, Shanghai, Beijing, Tokyo, Madrid, St. Petersburg). His works are exhibited in museums around the world: the Croatian Museum of Naïve Art in Zagreb, the Museum der 20. Jahrhunderts in Vienna, the Museu de Arte Contemporânea in São Paulo, the Metropolitan Museum in Manila, the Musee Henri Rousseau in Laval, the Setagaya Museum in Tokyo, the Museum of Art at the Carnegie Institute, the Museo Civico di Belle Arti in Lugano, and the Biblioteca Apostolica Vaticana in the Vatican. He created theater sets for the HNK in Zagreb and the Stadtopernhaus in Graz.

He was among the founders of the Croatian Democratic Union. He was elected twice as a member of the County Chamber of the Croatian Parliament.

In the 1990s, he drew a series of drawings about the human suffering in the Croatian War of Independence. He died in Zagreb in 2004.
