= Lavoslav Torti =

Croatian sculptor

Lavoslav Torti (27 February 1875 – 18 October 1942) was a Croatian sculptor. His works can be found at the Croatian Museum of Naïve Art in Zagreb.
