= Drago Jurak =

Croatian painter

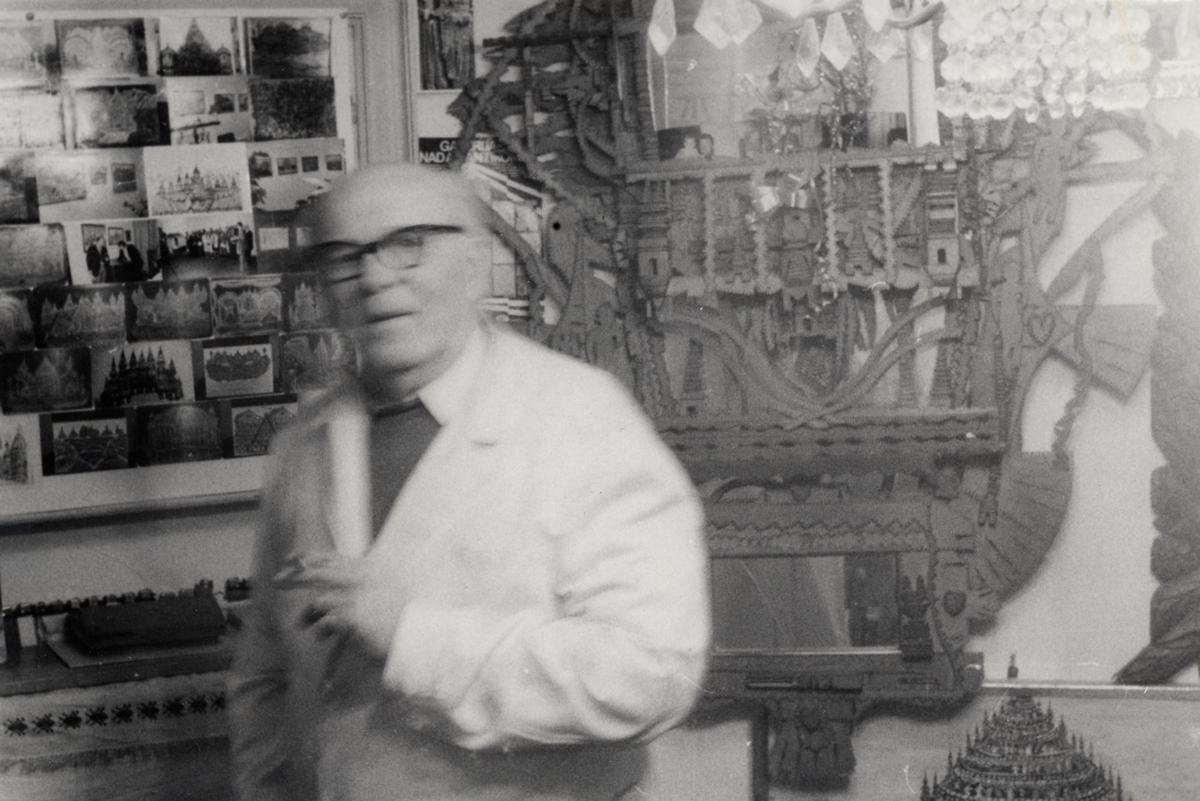
Drago Jurak

Drago Jurak (17 January 1911 – 1 January 1994) was a Croatian painter who was active during the time of Yugoslavia. His works can be found at the Croatian Museum of Naïve Art in Zagreb.

Jurak was schooled for a wheelwright, then worked as a scenographer and carpenter at the Croatian National Theater in Zagreb from 1938 to his retirement in 1971. In his free time, he made wooden models of buildings and reliefs using different materials. He started drawing and painting in the 1960s under mentorship of Krsto Hegedušić, and started exhibiting his works in 1967.
