= Ivan Večenaj =

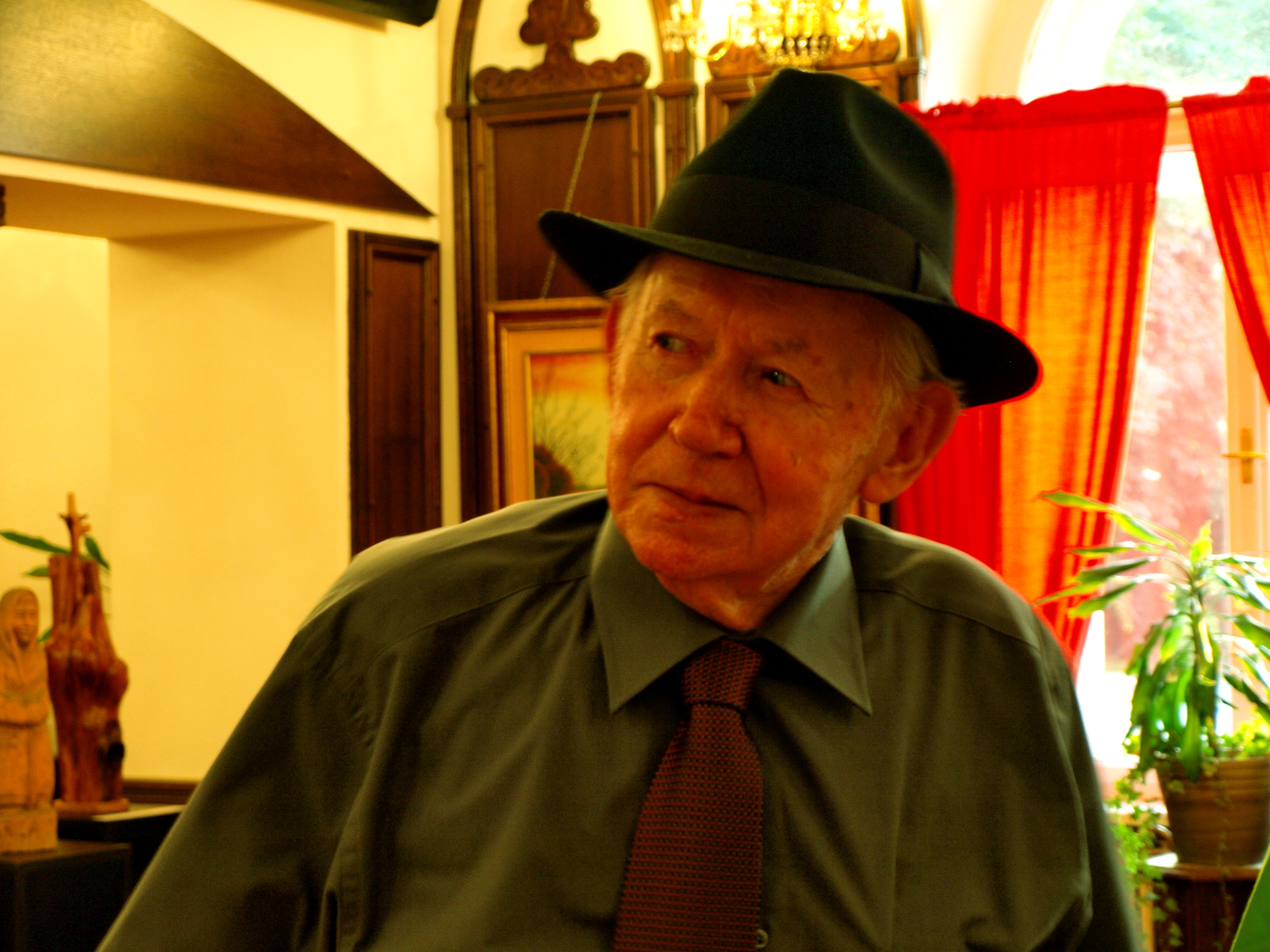
Ivan Večenaj

Ivan Večenaj (18 May 1920 – 13 February 2013; Koprivnica, Croatia) was a Croatian painter. His works can be found at the Croatian Museum of Naïve Art in Zagreb.
