= Germain Van der Steen =

Germain Van der Steen called Germain Vandersteen (1897-1985) was a French painter. He graduated from Oxford. After serving in World War I, he worked in Paris during the day and painted at night. He was self taught and he had three periods in his artistic career: the non-figurative period, the imaginary plants period and the period of bestiaries. He worked with very bright colors and had an exhibit at the Salon d'Automne in 1944. He had exhibitions in France, Yugoslavia, Croatia, the United States, Belgium, Austria, Germany, Brazil and Israel.
