= Martin Mehkek =

Croatian painter

Martin Mehkek (7 August 1936; Novačka – 1 July 2014; Koprivnica) was a Croatian painter. His works can be found at the Croatian Museum of Naïve Art in Zagreb. He is one of the most important members of the second generation of the "Hlebine School of Painting" and his works can be found in numerous private and public collections, galleries and museums. His typical motifs are mainly portraits of Roma, workers and farmers as well as scenes from everyday patriarchal life and the difficult life in the Podravina villages.
