= Eugen Buktenica =

Croatian painter

Eugen Buktenica (1914–1997) was a Croatian painter. His works can be found at the Croatian Museum of Naïve Art in Zagreb and the Zander Collection in Cologne. He was born in Grohote on the island of Šolta. The nature and life on the island in the Mediterranean provided the most subjects of his paintings
