= Petar Smajić =

Croatian painter and sculptor

Petar Smajić (1910–1985) was a Croatian painter and sculptor. His works can be found at the Croatian Museum of Naïve Art in Zagreb.
