= Ivan Generalić =

Croatian painter

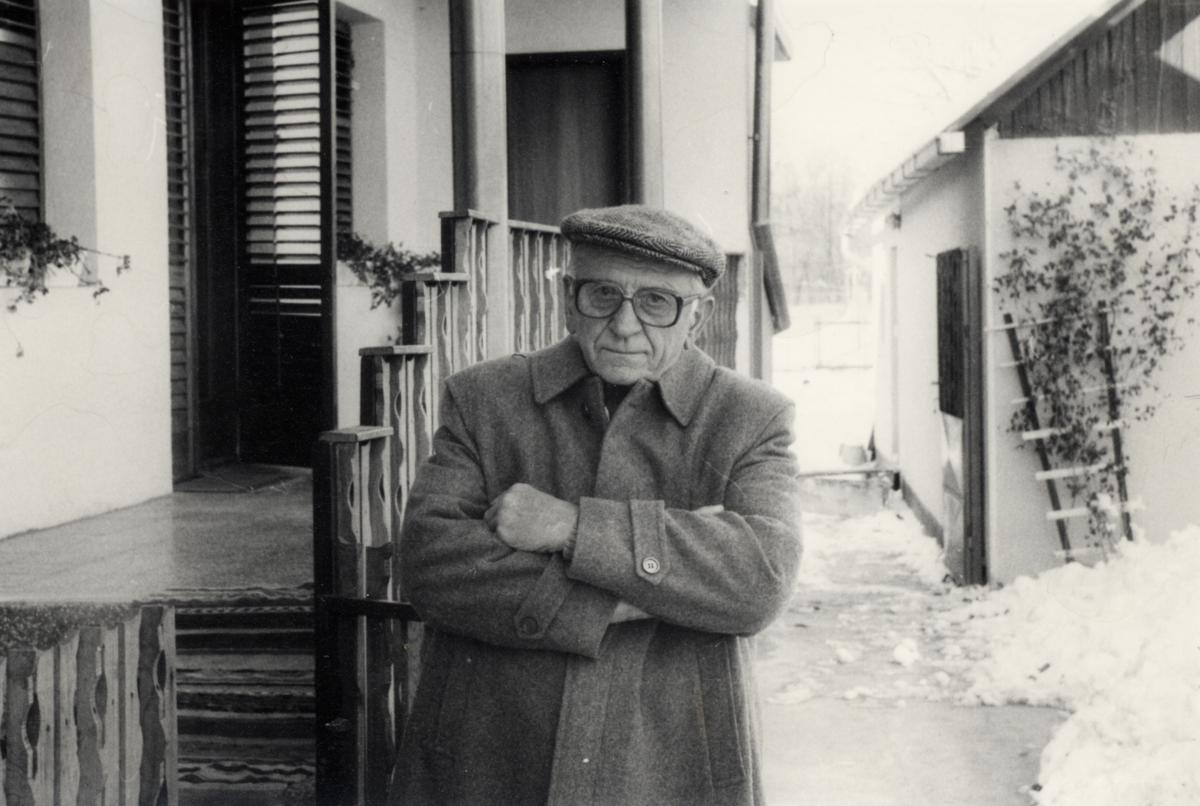
Ivan Generalić

Ivan Generalić (December 21, 1914 – November 27, 1992) was a Croatian painter in the naïve tradition.

== Biography ==
Generalić was born in Hlebine near Koprivnica. In elementary school, painting lessons were his greatest joy and as a child he used to earn money. He mostly drew with pencil on paper bags and some of these sketches were seen by Krsto Hegedušić, at the time (1930) just a student of the art academy, later a professor. Hegedušić was impressed with Generalić's work and organized Generalić's first public art exhibition, held in 1931 in the Zagreb Art pavilion. Positive critiques and contacts at the time led to a new era of not only Croatian, but also world art as well.

After World War II, in 1945 he became a member of ULUH (society of Croatian artists). In 1953 he exhibited in Paris, where he lived and painted for a few months. In 1959 he painted The Deer Wedding - his most valuable work, according to followers of the Croatian naïve art world. His home and peasant life of that time was his inspiration. His subjects include weddings, farm work, seasonal celebrations and funeral processions, and his rural scenes often included political commentaries on the social injustices of his time. Due to his technique of using oil paints on the reverse of a glass pane rather than conventional canvas, his pictures have a unique reflective quality.

Generalić has a large number of followers, beside his colleagues who form the first generation - Franjo Mraz and Mirko Virius. His second generation followers are Franjo Filipović, Dragan Gaži, Josip Generalić, Ivan Večenaj.

His work is part of the Zander Collection in Cologne among others.

== Bibliography ==
- Bihalji-Merin, Otto and Lise, ed. (1974). Die Kunst der Naiven. Ausstellungsleitung Haus der Kunst München e.V.
- Jakovsky, Anatole (1976). Peintres naïfs. Basel: Basilius-Presse AG.
- Zander, Charlotte, ed. (2005). Die Schule von Hlebine – 75 Jahre. Bönnigheim: Museum Charlotte Zander.
