= Hlebine =

Municipality in Koprivnica-Križevci County, Croatia

- Interactive map of Hlebine
- Location within Croatia
- Coordinates: 46°09′14″N 16°57′58″E
- Country: Croatia
- County: Koprivnica-Križevci County

Government
  - Mayor: Božica Trnski (HDZ)

Area
  - Total: 30.7 km^{2} (11.9 sq mi)

Population (2021)
  - Total: 1,180
  - Density: 38.4/km^{2} (99.6/sq mi)
- Time zone: UTC+1 (CET)
  - Summer (DST): UTC+2 (CEST)
- Postal code: 48316 Đelekovec
- Website: hlebine.hr

Hlebine is a settlement and a municipality in Koprivnica-Križevci County in Croatia.

According to the 2021 census, the municipality had 1,180 inhabitants, with Croats forming an absolute majority at 91.95%.

== History ==
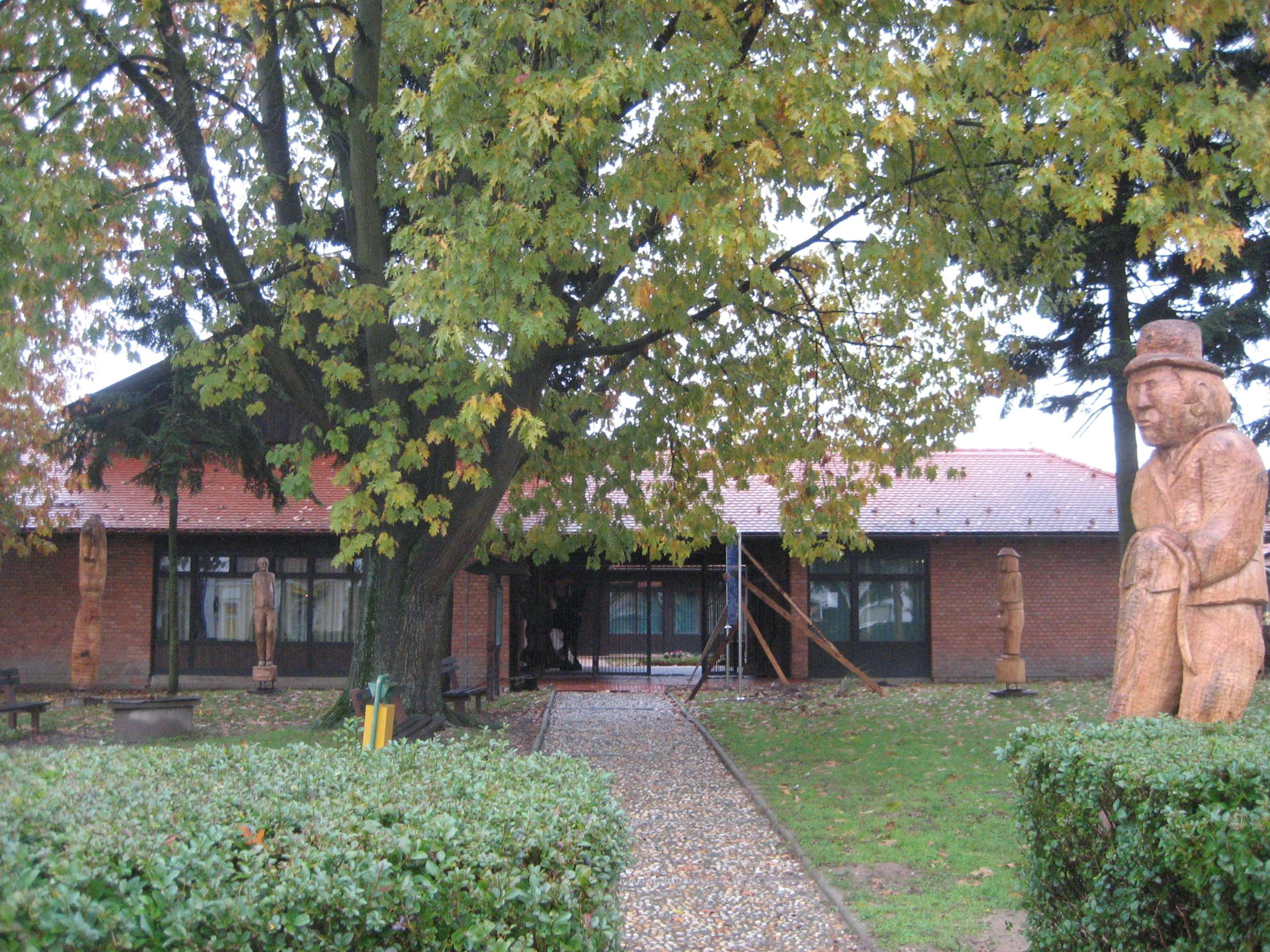
Croatian Naive Art Museum in Hlebine

Hlebine is first mentioned 1671 as a village in the Drnje parish. It became an independent parish in the 18th century. In the late 19th century and early 20th century, Hlebine was part of the Bjelovar-Križevci County of the Kingdom of Croatia-Slavonia. It was a part of Koprivnica county until 1993. Hlebine is also an important city for Croatian art, and is a center of Croatian naive art. It is a birth town of Franjo Mraz, Krsto Hegedušić, Ivan Generalić, Josip Generalić and Franjo Gaži.

== Population ==
The population has been decreasing continuously for a number of years. As of 2001, Hlebine had 1470 inhabitants with the overwhelming majority being Croats.

In 2021, the municipality had 1,180 residents in the following settlements:

- Gabajeva Greda, population 124
- Hlebine, population 1056
Hlebine: Population trends 1857–2021
v

population	1749	1711	2004	2169	2340	2594	2579	2612	2602	2543	2500	2234	1845	1606	1470	1304	1180
	1857	1869	1880	1890	1900	1910	1921	1931	1948	1953	1961	1971	1981	1991	2001	2011	2021

Sources: Croatian Bureau of Statistics publications

== Administration ==
The current mayor of Hlebine is Božica Trnski (HDZ) and the Hlebine Municipal Council consists of 9 seats.

Groups	Councilors per group
HDZ-Mreža	5 / 9
SDP-HSLS	4 / 9

== See also ==
- Hlebine School
