= Emerik Feješ =

Serbian painter

Emerik Feješ Емерик Фејеш
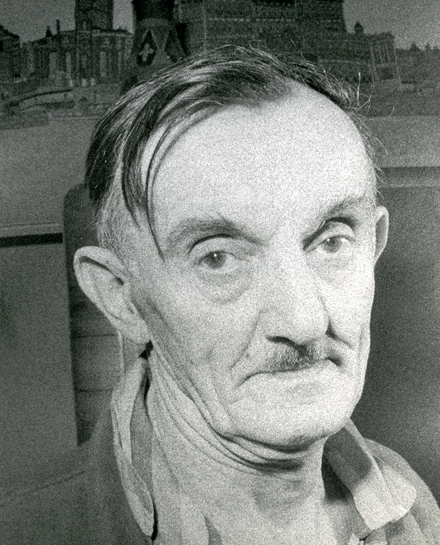
- Emerik Feješ
- Born: Emerik Feješ; November 3, 1904; Osijek, Austria-Hungary
- Died: July 9, 1969 (aged 64); Novi Sad, Serbia, Yugoslavia
- Known for: Painter
- Movement: Naïve art, Outsider art

Emerik Feješ (Serbian Cyrillic: Емерик Фејеш; November 3, 1904 – July 9, 1969) was a painter of Serbian naïve art.

== Biography ==
He was born in Osijek in 1904 in the Croatia-Slavonia (Kingdom of Hungary, Austria-Hungary, from 1918 part of the Serb-Croat-Slovene Kingdom) to a poor family of mixed Hungarian-Serbian heritage (original surname of his family was Stefanović / Стефановић). At the age of five he moved to Serbia with his parents and spent his life in Novi Sad. In the interwar period he worked as a button-maker, second-hand dealer, comb-maker, shop assistant and lathe operator in various towns of Yugoslavia. During World War II he lived in exile in Hungary, and in 1945 he returned to Novi Sad. Feješ suffered from asthma and sciatica throughout his life, keeping him bed-ridden. In 1949, he discovered painting and handicrafts, and began his first works. In 1969 Feješ died in Novi Sad, leaving behind many buttons and combs, and hundreds of pictures.

== Artistic Style ==
Emerik Feješ began his artistic career with depictions of nudes, portraits, still life, and genre scenes from suburban life. From 1954 onwards, he focused exclusively on urban landscapes. His first exhibition took place in 1955, followed by a solo show in 1956.

Feješ is considered a significant figure in the depiction of urban landscapes within the realms of naïve art and outsider art in the South–Slavic region. Despite a high degree of artistic freedom and stylistic abstraction, his compositions remained within the bounds of the recognizable. He often used black-and-white postcards depicting monumental architecture as templates. These were transferred to larger formats using carbon paper, with imaginative elements added in the process.

The realistic appearance and coloring of buildings were subordinated to his artistic vision, often resulting in representations that strongly deviated from the originals. His motifs included cities along the Adriatic Coast, in England, Germany, the Netherlands, Switzerland, France, India, and the North Sea region.

Feješ's distinctive visual language is marked by unique formal elements. Architectural features such as arches and architraves were sometimes represented by domino friezes, while windows or oculi were replaced with scattered buttons. His color palette is characterized by warm, vivid tones and a Fauvist intensity. His works are notable for the absence of narrative elements, instead emphasizing abstract forms, geometric tendencies, rhythmic structures, flatness, and ornamental detail.

The human figure played a minor role in Feješ's work. Instead, his compositions featured colorful, rhythmic arrangements that created dynamic, almost musical visual effects. These compositions conveyed a joyful and unique atmosphere, often described as visual rhapsodies of shapes and colors.

Feješ lived a reclusive life and struggled with health issues. During his lifetime, his work received little public attention. Only posthumously did he gain wider recognition. His paintings depicted a colorful visual world, his paintings would often take famous landmarks and depict them with a large range of color.

== Exhibitions ==
He exhibited his urban legends worldwide and many times received awards and recognition. The greatest and most representative collections of his works are in Museum of Naïve and Marginal Art (MNMA), Jagodina, Serbia, in Croatian Museum of Naïve Art, Zagreb, Gallery Elke und Werner Zimmer, Düsseldorf; and Zander Collection, Cologne, Germany, etc.

== Gallery ==
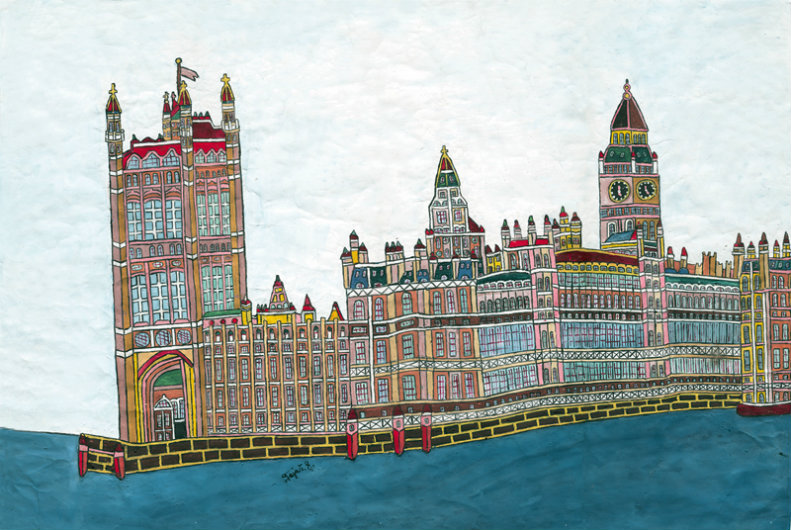
Big Ben - Parliament in London, about 1962,
tempera on paper, 56x85cm,
MNMA, Jagodina

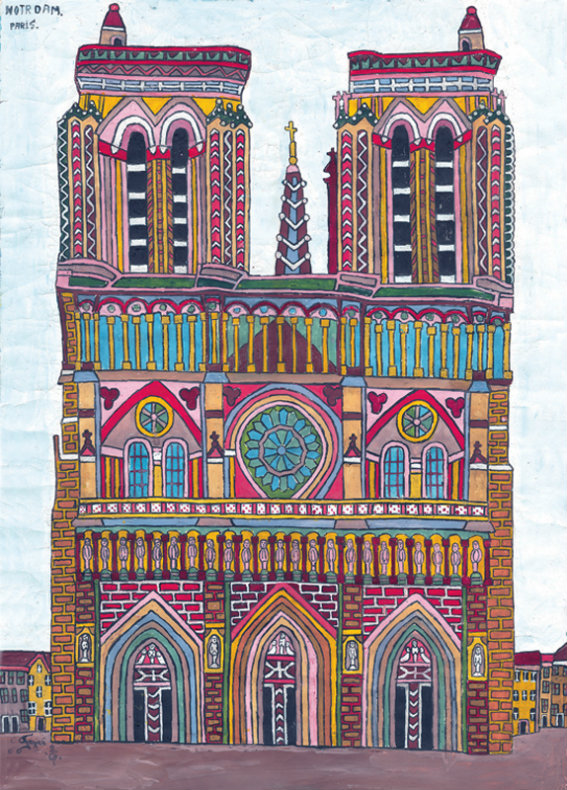
Notre Dame Cathedral in Paris, about 1962,
tempera on paper, 56x85cm,
MNMA, Jagodina

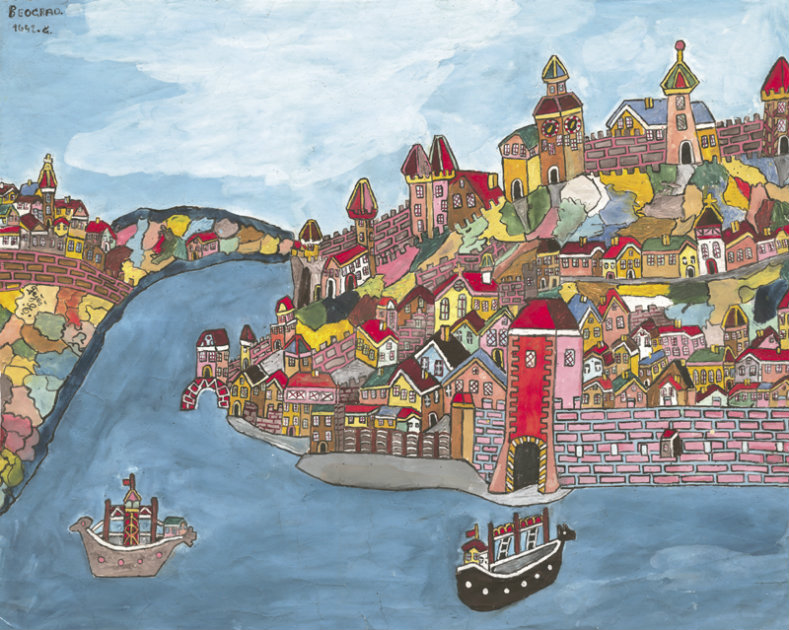
Old Belgrade, about 1960
tempera on paper, 58x73cm,
MNMA, Jagodina

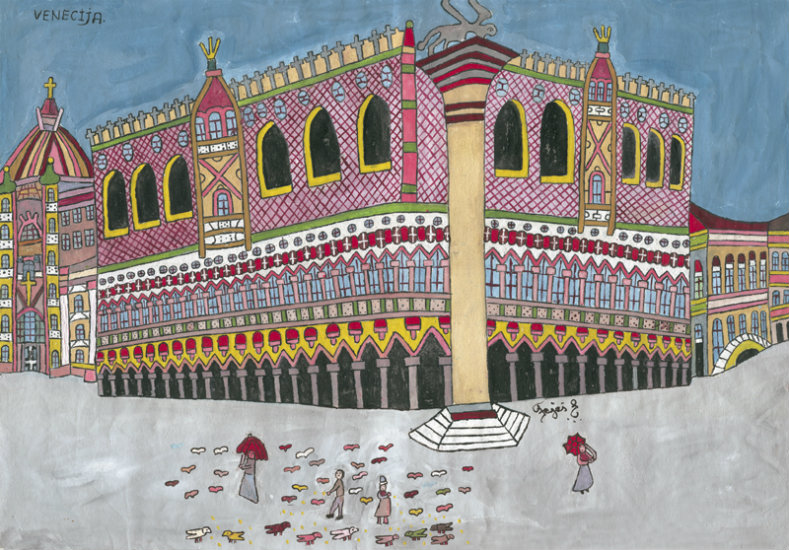
Venice, about 1966
tempera on paper, 58x40cm,
MNMA, Jagodina

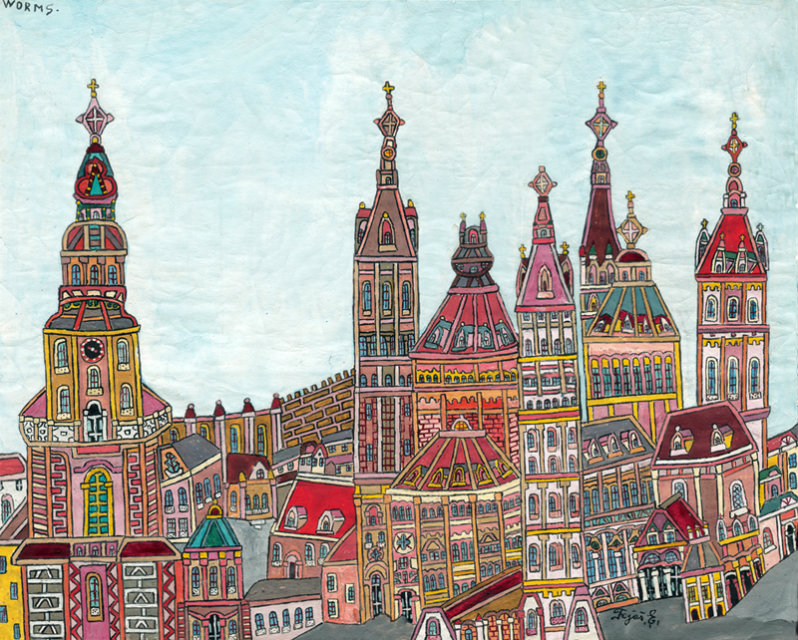
Worms, about 1963
tempera on paper, 50,5x62cm,
MNMA, Jagodina

== Literature ==
- М.Бошковић; М.Маширевић,Самоуки ликовни уметници у Србији, Торино, 1977
- Ото Бихаљи-Мерин; Небојша Бато Томашевић, Енциклопедија наивне уметности света, Београд, 1984
- Н. Крстић, Наивна уметност Србије, САНУ, MNMA, Jagodina, 2003
- Н. Крстић, Наивна и маргинална уметност Србије, MNMA, Jagodina, 2007
- N. Krstić, Outsiders, catalogue, MNMA, Jagodina, 2013
- Н. Крстић, Бајка о градовима, монографија, MNMA, Jagodina, 2014
- N. Krstić, Outsider Art in Serbia, MNMA, Јагодина, 2014, pp. 144–151
