= Franjo Mraz =

Croatian painter (1910–1981)

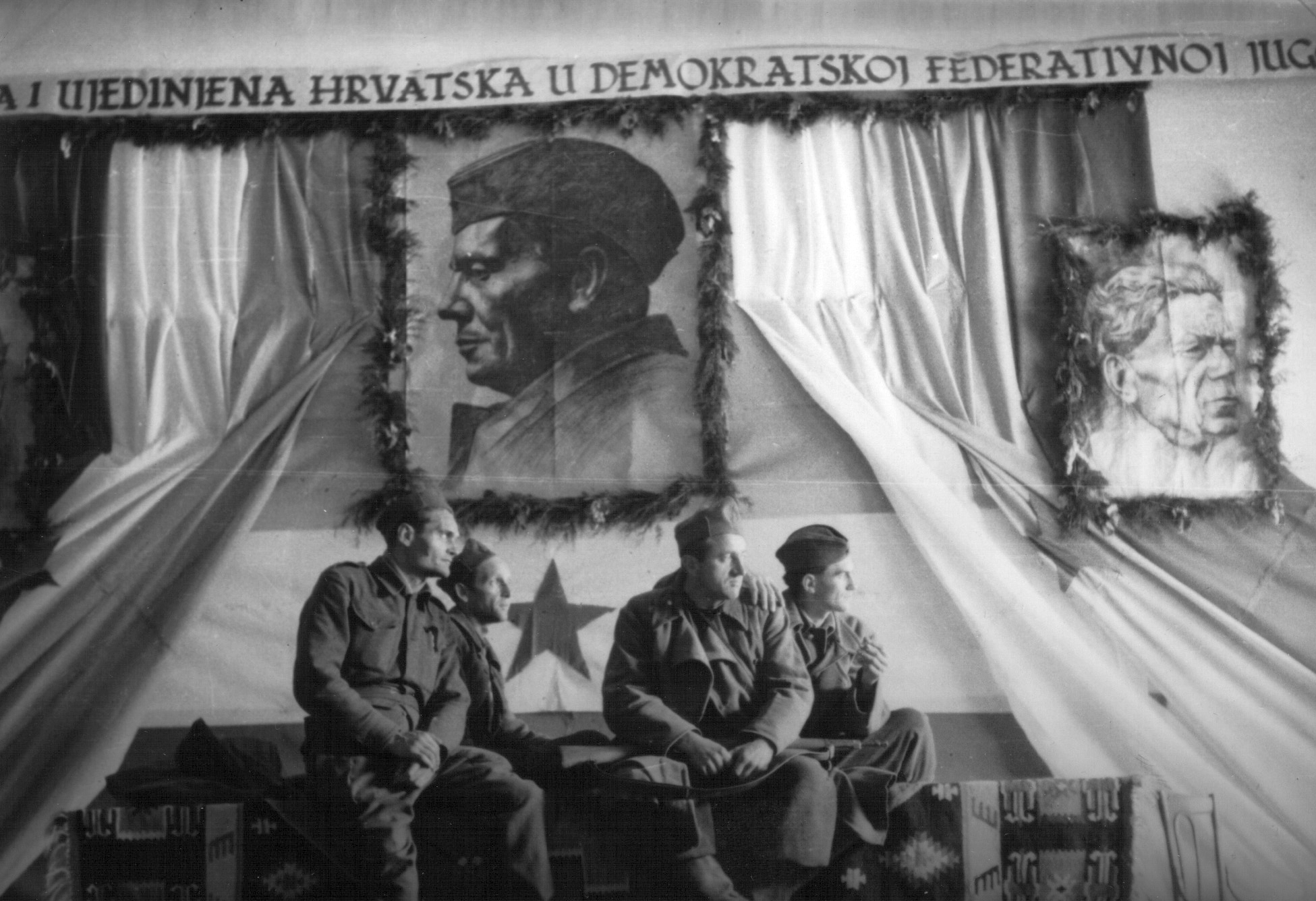
Artists Vanja Radauš, Franjo Mraz and Zlatko Prica after the III session of ZAVNOH

Franjo Mraz (4 April 1910 in Hlebine – 26 October 1981 in Brežice) was a notable Croatian artist. Together with Ivan Generalić and Mirko Virius, he is considered a founder of Croatian naive art. His most famous paintings are "Oranje" ('Ploughing') and "Zima" ('Winter').

== Sources ==
- Mađarević, Vlado (1982). "Samosvojni slikar Podravine Franjo Mraz" (PDF). Podravski zbornik (in Croatian) (8): 126–131.
- Rojčević, Jovo (1979). "Četiri desetljeća "crvene niti" Franje Mraza" (PDF). Podravski zbornik (in Croatian) (5): 51–59.
- Špoljar, Marijan (2010). "Između umjetnosti i ideologije". Kolo (in Croatian) (3–04). Matica hrvatska. ISSN 1331-0992.
