= Josip Generalić =

Croatian painter

Josip Generalić (1935–2004) was a Croatian painter. His works can be found at the Croatian Museum of Naïve Art in Zagreb.
