= Filip Trade Collection =

The Filip Trade Collection (Croatian: Zbirka Filip Trade) is a large private collection of contemporary Croatian art. The collection is a subsidiary of Filip Trade, a distribution company with its offices located in the capital city of Croatia, Zagreb. The offices and collection are currently undergoing a move and will soon be relocated in a purpose built venue in the Črnomerec district of Zagreb, Croatia. The collection was founded in the nineties with the acquisition of the Drystone Walls graphic by artist Oton Gliha, an acquisition suggested by the Croatian art critic and connoisseur Radovan Beck. Nowadays, the collection holds works of Croatian artists created from the 1950s, up to today. The earliest piece in the collection dates back to 1949 and is the bronze sculpture Bara with a Chicken by the Croatian sculptor Ivan Kožarić.

In the past several years the Collection has been more focused on the current production of artists of a younger and middle generation. The collection keeps longstanding relationships with some artists. For example, the collection has 33 works over a 12-year relationship with the Croatian painter Lovro Artuković. However the collection is also continually accepting new artists, in the last year 4 new artists were brought into the collection Silvia Sofija, Andreja Kulunčić, Silvo Šarić and the youngest artist in the collection, Igor Ruf, born 1984. The collection also has significant works from the artists involved in key periods and groups in Croatian art history, for example Exat 51, New Tendencies, Gorgona Group and Informel.

The collection is very involved in the contemporary art scene of Croatia. The Filip Trade award was distributed yearly from 2002 until 2005 to a young emerging Croatian artist. In 2002 the Filip Trade award was given to David Maljković, in 2003 the winner of the award was Matko Vekić, Kristian Kožul was the recipient in 2004 and in 2005 the Filip Trade award was presented to Viktor Popović. The collection has also worked with artists, independent artist associations and cultural institutions to organise various art projects and exhibitions throughout Europe. For example, the Filip Trade Collection organised a number of independent exhibitions which comprised the Linienstrasse113 project, organised in Berlin. The collection also regularly holds an exhibition hosted by Gallery 5 Kula at the yearly Motovun Film Festival in Istria, Croatia. They have also supported the publication of the artist book, Data book on Hydrocarbons, by one of their featured artists who works under the name, Puma 34.

== List of artists represented in the Filip Trade Collection ==
- Stanko Abadžić
- Marina Abramović
- Getulio Alviani
- Lovro Artuković
- Damir Babi
- Željko Badurina
- Gordana Bakić
- Vojin Bakić
- Breda Beban
- Milivoj Bijelić
- Tomislav Brajnović
- Gordana Bralić
- Ante Brkan
- Stojan Ćelić
- Boris Cvjetanović
- Radomir Damnjanović Damnjan
- Boris Demur
- Braco Dimitrijević
- Juraj Dobrović
- Zlatan Dumanić
- Dušan Džamonja
- Eugen Feller
- Ivan Fijolić
- Ivana Franke
- Mladen Galić
- Ivo Gattin
- Vilko Gecan
- Grubimiks Labyrinth
- Boris Guina
- Tina Gverović
- Stanko Herceg
- Oskar Herman
- Vlatka Horvat
- Nina Ivančić
- Nikolina Ivezić
- Ratko Janjić-Jobo
- Paulina Jazvić
- Anto Jerković
- Željko Jerman
- Marijan Jevšovar
- Duje Jurić
- Albert Kinert
- Željko Kipke
- Josip Klarica
- Julije Knifer
- Zlatko Kopljar
- Alem Korkut
- Daniel Kovač
- Nikola Koydl
- Ivan Kožarić
- Kristian Kozul
- Ines Krasić
- Vlado Kristl
- Andreja Kulunčić
- Julio Le Parc
- Kristina Lenard
- Zvonimir Lončarić
- Siniša Majkus
- David Maljković
- Dimitrije Bašičević, (Working under the name, Mangelos)
- Antun Maračić
- Ines Matijević Cakić
- Kata Mijatović
- Jadranka Mlinar
- Marijana Muljević
- Sofija Naletilić Penavuša
- Damir Očko
- Ljubo Perčinlić
- Jelena Perić
- Petikat
- Ordan Petlevski
- Ivan Picelj
- Viktor Popović
- Puma 34
- Nika Radić
- Kosta Angeli Radovani
- Lala Raščić
- Božidar Rašica
- Josip Restek
- Vjenceslav Richter
- Igor Rončević
- Igor Ruf
- Silvo Šarić
- Tomo Gecan Savic
- Edita Schubert
- Đuro Seder
- Frano Šimunović
- Sofija Silvia
- Damir Sokić
- Aleksandar Srnec
- Miljenko Stančić
- Mladen Stilinović
- Damir Stojnić
- Miroslav Šutej
- Marko Tadić
- Slaven Tolj
- Goran Trbuljak
- Marija Ujević-Galetović
- Nikola Ukić
- Viktor Vasarely
- Zlatan Vehabović
- Matko Vekić
- Mirjana Vodopija
- Zlatan Vrkljan
- Silvio Vujičić
- Vlasta Žanić

== Recent history of the Filip Trade Collection ==
- 2001

10 years of the Filip Trade Collection, exhibition and publication in association with the Croatian Association of Artists, Zagreb.

- 2002

Filip Trade Award, winner David Maljković for the work State of Paintings – Independent Form.
Filip Trade Collection, exhibition and publication in Gallery Manes, Prague.

- 2003

Filip Trade Award, winner Matko Vekić for the work The Sheep That Did Not Get Lost.

- 2004

Image and Object, exhibition and publication in the Art Gallery Dubrovnik, Dubrovnik.
The Repository, exhibition and publication, Ex - TKZ, Zagreb.
Filip Trade Award, winner Kristian Kožul for the work Golden Collection.

- 2005

Filip Trade Award, winner Viktor Popović for the work No Title.

- 2006

64, exhibition in Gallery Josip Račić, Zagreb.
12R37, exhibition, publication and posters in the Komiža City Library, Island of Vis (island).

- 2007 – 2008

Project Linienstrasse113, exhibitions and web site, Berlin.

- 2008

L.A. Unfinished, Promotion of the film by Igor Mirković in Cinema Europe.
A Different Motovun, exhibition and blog, at the Motovun Film Festival, Motovun.

- 2009

Finalists, Exhibition, publication and web site, Labin City Gallery (Sabina Salamon), Labin.
Why So Serious?, exhibition and artist book by Puma 34: Data book on Hydrocarbons at the Motovun Film Festival, Motovun.
This exhibition is dedicated to our grandfather K.P., exhibition and promotion of artist book: Data book on Hydrocarbons, in association with the Croatian Designers Association, Zagreb.

- 2010

In Person, exhibition and web site at the Motovun Film Festival, Motovun.
