= Contemporary Croatian painting =

Contemporary Croatian painting. The term "the end of painting" appears in the descriptions of radical art movements in painting that express the nihilistic stance towards the progress of artistic creation. Such an attitude was stimulated by the disappearance of the utopian dimension of art, which was meant to transform the social relations and the position of man towards himself, in a time marked by the deaths of political ideologies and the strengthening of global capitalism.

Artistic movements of this type are active throughout the 20th century, culminating with Malevich's White Square on the white background, Reinhardt's black canvases from the fifties, analytical painting, and finally emphasising the verbal component of conceptual art. The phrase "Return to painting" as a media and tradition, is a reaction to the mentioned art practices and manifests itself in the realities of the twenties and thirties of the 20th century (Forces Nouvelles in France, Valori Plastici and Novecento in Italy, Verism and Neue Sachlichkeit in Germany, Precisionism and Regionalism in America) and in the eighties (Neue Wilde, Transavantgarde, Neo-Expressionism).

The lack of interest for painting during the nineties influenced the new ways of performing arts (performance, land-art, body art, etc.) and the expressive possibilities offered by electronic and digital media (installations, video). Elements that make today's art valuable and relevant are collective art practices, participatory aesthetics, and social engagement, and the "ideology of the new" has almost become a canon in (post) modern exchange of ideas. At the beginning of the 21st century, new momentum is emerging in the media of painting, and contemporary art is marked by the search for inspiration in various styles, movements, and currents of art history, so there are frequent quotes and references within visual art. Croatian contemporary painting is characterized by the pluralism of styles ranging from traditional media relations to multidisciplinarity and the exit from the conventional boundaries of the image.

== Painting of the nineties ==
In the nineties, there was no art practice in Croatian painting that would unite the perspectives of active artists, but the influence of the new painting (from the seventies) and the new painting of the eighties dominated.

In the seventies, Đuro Seder proclaimed a dogmatic view on painting as a self-limiting medium in his text "Impossibility of Painting“ (1971). He gradually progressed from monochromatic paintings, which had problematized the relationship towards painting and denied the sense of narrative artistic content whereas in the eighties, he began to see the possibility of non-referential art, that by reproducing the artist's experience creates a new autonomic reality within the work. His works from the nineties are characterized by an expressive stroke and a thick paint application, with an emphasis on building the image, while figuration and content remain side elements. He is turning to religious themes that challenge the spiritual crisis of a man seeking the figure of Christ as the founding hope in fulfilling human aspirations.

Vatroslav Kuliš creates works somewhere between realism and abstraction, maintaining the connection with nature by using motives of landscapes, sea, and water. Igor Zidić explains his art using the term neoromanticism, which is manifested in the coloristic compositions of utopian character and emphasizing the perfection of nature and the dreamy escape from reality. By using various materials (sand, wax, pigment, jars, cardboard) and combining media (painting, photography, installations), he seeks to erase the boundaries between art and reality. His recent works are mostly abstract colourist compositions characterized by almost lyrical character, the spontaneity of the movement, and absence of narrative content.

The paintings of Igor Rončević in the eighties and nineties mark the duality between abstraction and figure, which, according to Zvonko Maković, refers to "the illusion of existence". The artist dissolves and fragments objects and characters, emphasizes colour and brush strokes, and offers ambiguous interpretations of the content. The transavantgarde approach to the image is manifested in the artist's study of various possibilities of acting in pure painting, that doesn't exclude his aesthetic, associative or any other values, which was the case in analytical painting.

The work of Edita Schubert in the 1980s was based on a geometric abstraction that was constantly interpreted within the influence of the neo-geo movement. In the Portable series in the 1990s, she creates works she calls „collages“, canvases of standardized format entirely covered by even paint strokes freed from expressivity and extra significance, thereby approaching more analytical painting. Reducing the visual language to a colour-based confrontation of two colours is a way of reflecting on the image category and emphasizing its objectivity and portability as the title itself suggests.

After expressionism and colourism in the first half of the eighties, during her stay in New York (1986-93) Nina Ivančić gravitated to the apersonal abstract-geometric mode of neo-geo, and in the 1990s she produced a series of paintings called Ghosts, silhouettes of ships in flat and rigid black acrylic on a white canvas base. The results are the paintings-diagrams which she, after the year 2000, multiples and expands, and intertwines with the images of the airplanes. She drew inspiration from the promotional brochures and the pop artist heritage of Lichtenstein and Rosenquist, which makes her paintings historically retrospective, while on the other hand she shows a certain legacy and further development of non-expressionism during her stay in America.

Zoltan Novak begins to paint in the 1980s, and his work is characterized by a visible psychological-expressive moment in depictions of impertinent and lonely human characters, with morally and mentally empty psyches. The representative symbol of his painting is the motif of the walker, while in his recent works the painter gives his own introspective view of the urban man who is lonely within modern megalopolis.

== Transdisciplinary model of creativity ==
The transdisciplinary model of creativity implies a free choice of the most appropriate solution for the production, realization, and presentation of a concept. Many Croatian artists create works that, by combining different media, tend to cross the boundaries of the image, and often instead of the expression denoting a specific media (painter, sculptor, video artist, etc.), the term visual artist is used.

Damir Sokić's work ranges from analytic and primary over transavantgarde and neo-geometry to installations, objects, and assemblages. He is a protagonist of new and innovative artistic thoughts and actions, and he works in almost all media, trying to overcome the boundaries of a single media guided by the interest for pure art speech. In his works, he often refers to the artists and performers of modern art, especially Mondrian in his neoplastic series and installations that he adapts to new visual possibilities and demands.

Boris Demur is a painter, conceptual and multimedia artist, performer, theoretician and one of the most provocative protagonists of contemporary visual art. At the Academy of Fine Arts in Zagreb, he showed interest in radical conceptual solutions and processual, theoretical and analytical research of the nature of painting language. The processual character of his artistic practice is defined by the discovery of a spiral form that becomes an identifying sign of his art. By repeating and making variations of the same motif, he introduced a component of time and existential expression in the form of spiral motion in his work. The spiral often comes with new signs (such as crosses, yin and yang, ancient Chinese symbols), thus enriching it with layers of new meanings. The result is a combination of primary and analytical action painting, further elaborated with verbal components and outdoor work in the form of land-art, which he documents with photos and videos.

Željko Kipke became interested in the transavantgarde spirit in the early 1980s, and since the 1990s, in the spirit of postmodernism, he has been redefining the limits of figuration and abstraction and integrating the verbal component into his work. He creates multimedia exhibitions (a combination of literature, painting and video works) supported by theoretical works, where he defines his own notion of the Painting of the New Aeon, which marks the complex process of opposing various meanings and symbols linking the paintings with the field of philosophy, mathematics, computer science, etc. The series of five images from 2010 was directed like "stages of a scenario for the movie about cinephilic dictators, a bottle of wine, a spiral of success and scenes of real crimes" and is dedicated to the victims of political systems like the British biochemist who was liquidated along with his wife and minor daughter.

Duje Jurić is one of the protagonists of the aesthetics of neoconstructive and neoplastic painting based on Bauhaus, De Stijl, New Tendencies, and Fluxus. At the end of the 1990s, he accepted the motive of a computer chip, that is, memory chips in his work. He experimented with strong, open colours combined with a dense network of horizontal shapes and colours. The artist often exhibits a series of images that logically continue one after another, thus obtaining long horizontal friezes that can be up to 15 meters in length. The verbal component appeared in the mid-80s in certain works, but culminated in a series of Paintings-books (2000), consisting of horizontally and vertically-painted grids, where he writes words without a syntactic meaning, of incomprehensible interrelationship and in various languages.

At the beginning of the new millennium, he began to experiment with the refraction of light and created light environments in which he introduced a new plastic-visual design element.

Tomislav Buntak appeared on the art scene in the late nineties as a representative of religious painting in which he integrates the current Christian and humanistic messages and questions the need for new spirituality. In the drawings with the fluid lines, which he makes with silver or gold pen, he depicts idyllic timeless world with elements of Arcadia and allegory, which are in strong contrast with the reality of our time.

The creativity of Matko Vekić includes a wide range of traditional painting techniques, intertwined with skilful craftsmanship, as well as meaningful dialogue with some of the forms of other media. He builds a motor in his works, which rotates them so they look like rotating advertising billboards. The work The sheep that have not been lost show lambs rotating in the form of an advertising billboard. It represents an ironic combination of a high-tech world and the world, which in its original rusticity (barbecued lamb) is transformed into a product that advertises itself as fast-food.

== Realism in Contemporary Croatian Art ==
Lovro Artuković is a representative of realistic painting in Croatia. His art is based on a traditional approach, on searching for patterns in nature, drawing by observing and eventually using drawings for creating a composition. . In the second half of the nineties, he changes his style and uses this static medium for depicting the course of time by creating series of double portraits and nature scenes without characters with a visible shift towards pure painting. In the series of paintings Artists in Nature, Artuković creates allegorical images of art: Jasper Johns, Anselm Kiefer, Joseph Beuys, Ivan Kožarić, Igor Rončević and Željko Kipke. The works are done in a similar form of monochrome compositions with silhouettes of characters and colour-accentuated details and/or realistic depictions. With these works, Artuković addresses the painting conditions in „the end of art“ circumstances and expresses distrust in the representational systems of the new art. In the series Pictures Seen by Someone Else, Artuković continues to elaborate the synchronization of the actual and imaginary, contemporary and historical within the image context.

The ambiance in which the characters are placed resembles a staged scene, thus emphasizing the opposition between fiction and reality within the work, which becomes the main theme of this cycle.

The series Fake scenes consist of staged sceneries within basement spaces in which the artist plays with ambiguous puns of visual and semantic images. In further work, he turns to veristic scenes, which he physically creates in his atelier or in rented spaces.

Under the influence of the realistic trends that emerge at the Zagreb Academy of Fine Art and the art of Lovro Artuković, a new generation of young artists is being formed in the spirit of new realism. What many artists have in common are scenes of a realistic motif, which are at the same time a reflection of the artist's inner self and his attitude towards the world.

Stipan Tadić creates paintings from a series of strokes in quadratic fields that merge into a coherent whole, in which he shows that it is possible to remain faithful to the image and at the same time to show the width of formal aspects of painting. He refers to old masters by recreating their way of painting, such as painting traditional nudes in the technique of egg tempera and oil or interpolating motives from representative works in art history in the contemporary content.

Zlatan Vehabović's painting consists of figural representations of topics from personal life or selected topics in popular media such as styles of films, books, newspapers, magazines or postcards. Items and characters, located in empty spaces or undefined landscapes, do not convey a real scene but reflect the artist's personal experience or imagination.

== See also ==
- Modern Gallery
- Museum of Contemporary Art

== Sources ==
1. Frenceschi, Branko. Multidisciplinarity, in: K15 Glossary of New Croatian Art, Krešimir Purgar (editor), Kontura Art Magazine, Zagreb, 2007, 72 – 83

2. Gavrilović, Feđa. „Lauba: First nine months of the House for people and art“, in: Kontura Art Magazine, Number 116, Zagreb, March 2012, p. 72 -76

3. Gavrilović, Feđa. “Stipan Tadić: Layered content and masterful realism”, in: Kontura Art Magazine, Number 118/119, Zagreb, 2012, p. 60 – 63

4. Gavrilović, Feđa. On the exhibited works, Text on the exhibition New Croatian Realism – Painting, Glyptotheque of the Croatian Academy of Arts and Sciences, December 2013 – January 2014 http://info.hazu.hr/izlozbe/exhibitMenu/exhibitMenu/show/exhibit_id=153, downloaded 10 January 2014

5. Gudelj Barać, Loreta. Zoltan Novak: An individual in a labyrinth of megalopolis, in: Kontura Art Magazine, Number 120, Zagreb, 2013, p. 72-73

6. Jozić, Mirko. Faces of the Infinite: Bottom of Existence and Bottom of the World, in: Exhibition Catalogue Đuro Seder: Faces of the Infinite, Klovićevi Dvori Gallery, Zagreb, 20 February 2007 – 15 April 2007, 1 - 16

7. Kipke, Željko. Predators, cinephiles and a bottle of wine, in: Exhibition Catalogue Kipke: Police Courtyard, Radovan Vuković (editor), Art Pavilion, Zagreb, 12 September – 14 October 2012, 45 – 50

8. Koljanin, Ana-Marija. Temporality, in: K15 Glossary of New Croatian Art, Krešimir Purgar (editor), Kontura Art Magazine, Zagreb, 2007, 150 – 165

9. Lauba, official website, Text on Exhibition Zlatan Vehabović: Cursed Crew, Lauba January 2014, https://web.archive.org/web/20140405132825/http://www.lauba.hr/hr/kalendar-9/zlatan-vehabovic-prokleta-posada-09-01-2014-24-01-2014-1342, downloaded: 10 January 2014

10. Maković, Zvonko. Dimensions of Painting, Meandar, Zagreb, 2005

11. Pančević, Dalibor. Edita Schubert: from Trapeze to Apartment: Artistic Work from 1985 to 1999", graduate thesis, University of Zagreb, Faculty of Humanities and Social Sciences, Department of Art History, 2000

12. Perica, Blaženka. Catalogue of a Retrospective: Lovro Artuković: Best Paintings, Klovićevi Dvori Gallery, Zagreb, 24 April – 8 June 2008

13. Prelog, Petar. Biography Matko Vekić, https://web.archive.org/web/20131226073716/http://matko-vekic.com/index1.htm, downloaded: 20 January 2014.

14. Roje Depolo, Lidija. Duje Jurić : Works 1988 – 2002, Glyptotheque of the Croatian Academy of Arts and Sciences, Zagreb, 2002

15. Rus, Zdenko, Exhibition Catalogue Boris Demur Retrospective I. Expressionism as Reality of Life and Art Reality: Primary, Analytical, Elementary, Processual Painting and Sculpture: Spiral Painting and Spiral Sculpture 1970-2000, Modern Gallery, Zagreb, 16 March – 30 April 2004

16. Rus, Z., "End of Painting?" In: K15 Glossary of New Croatian Art, Krešimir Purgar (editor), Kontura Art Magazine, Zagreb, 2007, p. 62-71

17. Srhoj, Vinko. Neo-Modernism, in: K15 Glossary of New Croatian Art, Krešimir Purgar (editor), Kontura Art Magazine, Zagreb, 2007, p. 84-97

18. Srhoj, Vinko. Željko Kipke or the bulk cargo of “added value”, in: Kontura Art Magazine, Number 118/119, Zagreb, 2012, p. 46-47

19. Viculin, Marina. Exhibition Catalogue Damir Sokić: Blind streets, Klovićevi dvori Gallery, Zagreb, 17 December 2013 – 9 April 2014

20. Vukić, Feđa. Lovro Artuković 1985 – 1997, Meandar, Zagreb, 1998

21. Zidić, Igor. Vatroslav Kuliš and his work: letter, figures, motives, language", Školska knjiga, Zagreb, 2010, p. 450 – 460

22. Župan, Ivica. Tomislav Buntak - The need for an establishment of a new spirituality, in: Kontura Art Magazine, Number 118/119, Zagreb 2012, 48 - 51
