= Group of Six Artists =

The Group of Six Artists or The Group of Six Authors (Croatian: Grupa šestorice autora) was an artist collective founded in 1975 by the Croatian artists Mladen Stilinović, Sven Stilinović, Fedor Vučemilović, Boris Demur, Vlado Martek and Željko Jerman in Zagreb, Croatia.

In defiance of restrictions set by local art institutions, they performed their pieces in open air spaces using objects such as sun loungers and urban projectors (projecting images onto buildings). They also exhibited in city squares. The "exhibition-actions" were shown in Croatia and abroad, including the municipal bath on the Sava River in the Upper Town Zagreb centre, in Sopot in New Zagreb in the main square in Zagreb (1975), on the beach in Mošćenička Draga (1976), in Venice (1978) and in Belgrade (1976-1978). These exhibitions would usually last a day and were often meant to provoke. Between 1975 and 1979, the Group of Six Artists performed and documented more than 20 pieces. The Group of Six Artists were influenced by their predecessors, the Gorgona Group. The work of the Group of Six Authors was shaped by both collective and individual practices that followed the legacy of the Gorgona group, while branching into diverse artistic fields: experimental film and art (Mladen Stilinović), poetry (Vlado Martek), photography (Željko Jerman, Sven Stilinović, Fedor Vučemilović), and painting (Boris Demur). Their activities were closely or interpretively linked to various artists, movements, and collectives, including Dimitrij Bašičević Mangelos, the Group of Six Artists from the Belgrade SKC, Goran Đorđević, the Bosch+Bosch Group (Balint Sombathy, Katalin Ladik), Group 143, and later the Slovenian NSK movement and the group IRWIN, as well as the Sarajevo-based group Zvono. Overall, their aim was to provide a different perspective on life and art, expressing themselves freely. Starting in 1977, the group began doing exhibition-actions in gallery spaces. At a 1978 show at Nova Gallery in Zagreb, they played with the idea of “oral tradition” by making sure each artist stayed next to their work. That way, they could chat directly with visitors, explain their pieces, and share bigger thoughts about art—just like they used to do during their street performances.

In addition to their exhibition-actions, the Group of Six Artists launched the self-published magazine MAJ/75, printed in the studio of Vlasta Delimar and Željko Jerman. Eighteen issues of the magazine were printed between 1978 and 1984, and the publication became an additional alternative exhibition space for the Group of Six Artists and other eastern European creatives, including Vlasta Delimar, Tomislav Gotovac, Sanja Iveković, Mangelos, Balint Szombathy, Raša Todosijević and Goran Trbuljak.

== Works ==
Although the approaches of the Group of Six Authors differed among individual members, their practices collectively gravitated toward a conceptual framework that foregrounded strategies of deconstruction and deskilling across traditional artistic media, including painting, photography, poetry, and film. Text emerged as a central element in the work of several members, most notably Mladen Stilinović and Vlado Martek, both of whom consistently interrogated the material and semantic limits of language. The works presented during one of their collective walks exemplify these divergent yet conceptually aligned methodologies: Sven Stilinović carried a cameraless photographic piece inscribed with the phrase “This Is a Portrait of My Friend Željko Jerman” written directly in photo fixer, while Fedor Vučemilović contributed a similarly cameraless image composed of stark white stripes against a black background. Željko Jerman wore a collared shirt emblazoned with the phrase “This is my youth” and bore a cross-shaped assemblage incorporating both camera-based and cameraless photographic elements, including an imprint of his hand. Boris Demur carried a predominantly black monochrome painting interrupted only by a white parallelogram within which the phrase “I’m not crazy enough to paint bourgeois paintings” appeared in red. Martek brought Pride, an object composed of a bicycle wheel, a slip of white paper with the title, and a photograph of himself inserted between the spokes. Stilinović’s Red Paintings consisted of two oil pastel drawings in differing shades of red, each labeled with the corresponding term “red” rendered in the same tone. Taken together, these works constituted a radical refusal of representation, artisanal skill, and conventional modes of aesthetic presentation, while simultaneously articulating critical engagements with subjectivity, desire, and the ideological apparatus of late socialist Yugoslavia.

== Exhibition and actions ==
The group exhibited regularly in Croatia.

- 1979: former Republic Square, Zagreb, Croatia (together with RZU Podrum)
- 1979: Faculty of Economy, Zagreb, Croatia
- 1979: Studentski centar, Zagreb, Croatia (with RZU Podrum)
- 1978: Life Art, Galerija SKC, Belgrade, Serbia
- 1978: Voćarska 5, Zagreb, Croatia
- 1978: former Republic Square, Zagreb, Croatia
- 1977: Studentski centar, Zagreb, Croatia
- 1977: Neboder passage, Zagreb, Croatia
- 1977: Galerija SKC, Belgrade, Serbia
- 1975–77: Contemporary Art Gallery (Cefft), Zagreb, Croatia
- 1977: Faculty of Philosophy, Belgrade, Serbia
- 1977: Faculty of Philosophy, Zagreb, Croatia
- 1976: beach in Mošćenička Draga, Croatia
- 1976: strolling through Zagreb, Croatia
- 1976: 5 April Meetings, Belgrade, Serbia
- 1975: the public baths on the river Sava, Zagreb, Croatia
- 1975: Sopot, Zagreb, Croatia
- 1975: Jesuit Square, Zagreb, Croatia
