= Matko Vekić =

Croatian painter

Matko Vekić (born 1970 in Zagreb, Yugoslavia) is a contemporary Croatian artist working in the medium of painting. He has been described as one of the most prominent Croatian painters of the younger generation.

Vekić uses diverse everyday motifs (cars, a rat and a goldfish, insects, traffic interchanges and bridges, relays and transmission lines, women terrorists and body builders, football players and models) to problematise and address the irony the state of contemporary society.

== Education and early career ==
Matko Vekić was born on 6 November 1970 in Zagreb, Croatia. He graduated in painting from the Academy of Fine Arts in Zagreb in 1995, in the class of Professor Đuro Seder.

== Career as a teacher ==
From 1996 to 1999 he worked as a lecturer of drawing and painting at the School of Applied Arts and Design in Zagreb, and from 1999 to 2003 he was a teaching assistant (later assistant professor) at the Academy of Fine Arts in Široki Brijeg, University of Mostar. From 2007 he has been an assistant professor at the Academy of Fine Arts, University of Zagreb and the associate professor from 2011 at the Academy of Fine Arts, University of Zagreb.

== Creative work and awards ==
As of 2008, he has had 32 solo exhibitions in Croatia and abroad, including Gallery Nova (Zagreb, 1996), Art Gallery (Split, 2003) and Art Pavilion (Zagreb, 2005). Together with Nikola Koydl and Zoltan Novak, he was the Croatian representative at the Venice Biennale in 2009. His works belong to many museum and gallery collections, including the Modern Gallery in Zagreb and Gallery of Fine Arts in Split, where they are on permanent display.

For his artistic work he has received over a dozen awards and recognitions, including the annual Filip Trade Award (Zagreb, 2003) and the annual Croatian Association of Artists for Young Painters (Zagreb, 2002). He was also awarded with the annual Croatian Artists Association award, Lissone in 2001, Premio Lissone in 2003, at the 10th and the 12th International Cairo Biennale in 2006 and 2010. He is a member of the Association of Artists and the Croatian Freelance Artists' Association. He lives in Zagreb.

== Published works on Matko Vekić ==
- Prelog, Petar - Matko Vekić (Fraktura, Zaprešić, 2005).
- Ed. Vuković, Radovan – Matko Vekić: the Animal Circle, the Zodiac Circle, (exh. cat, Art Pavilion, Zagreb, 15/2/2005).
- Ed. Kralj, Ariana – Matko Vekić: Symbol, Sign, Emblem, Ornament and Crime, (exh. cat, Croatian Academy of Sciences and Arts, June 2008).
- Ed. Gottwald, Gaella A. – Matko Vekić: Okrutnost Kruga, (exh. cat, HDLU, Zagreb, October 2010).
