= Mladen Stilinović =

Croatian artist (1947–2016)

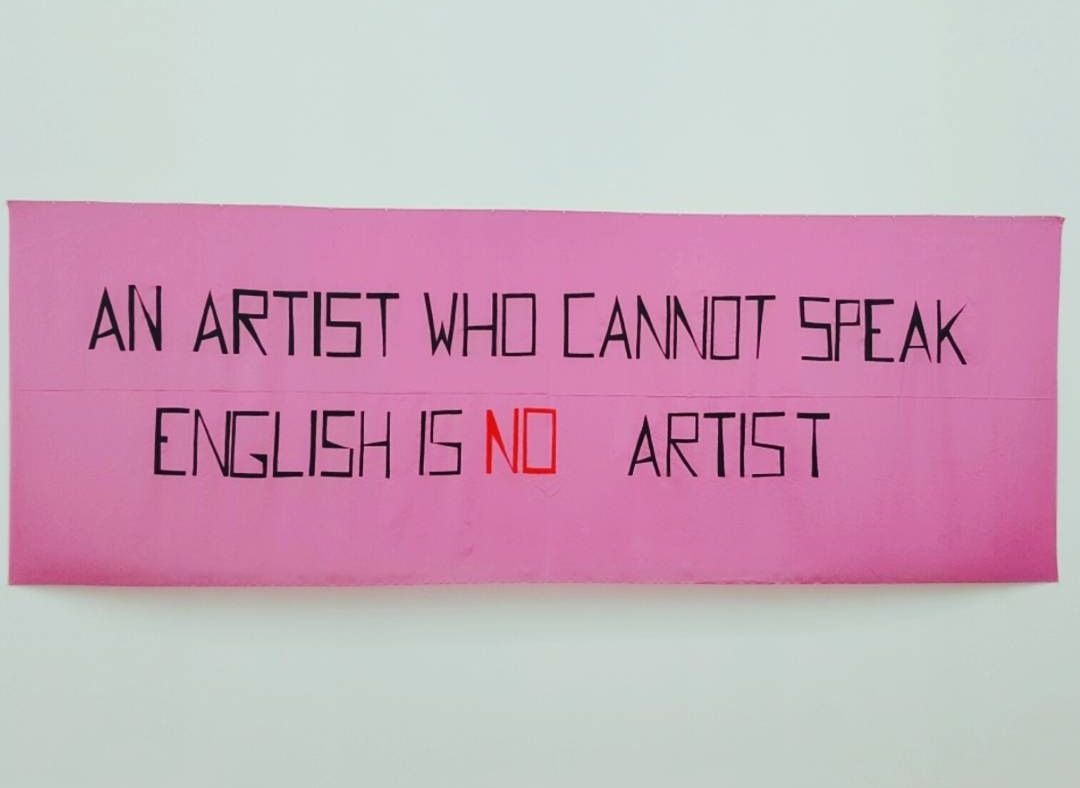
- Mladen Stilinovic
- Born: 10 April 1947; Belgrade, Serbia
- Died: 18 July 2016 (aged 69); Pula, Croatia
- Occupation: Conceptual artist
- Years active: 1969-2016
- Known for: Group of Six Artists
- Notable work: An Artist Who Cannot Speak English Is No Artist, 1992
- Website: https://mladenstilinovic.com/

Mladen Stilinović (10 April 1947 – 18 July 2016) was a Croatian conceptual artist and one of the leading figures of the so-called "New Art Practice" in Croatia. He lived and worked in Zagreb, Croatia.

== Early life ==
Stilinović was born in Belgrade, Serbia, to father Marijan Stilinović, who early in his career was an editor of the newspaper Borba, ambassador to Argentina, and later head of Museum of Contemporary Art, Zagreb, and mother Nada Stilinović (née Popović).

== Career ==
Stilinović's works are based on the idea of social and art critique. They are often witty, and come with a dose of irony and cynicism illustrated for example in his work, Money is Money, Art is Art. He was one of the founding members of the informal neo-avantgarde, Group of Six Artists (Grupa šestorice autora), together with Vlado Martek, Boris Demur, Željko Jerman, Sven Stilinović and Fedomir Vučemilović. The group was active in Zagreb from 1975 to 1979. In addition to his artistic creative output, he also managed the Extended Media Gallery (1981–1991), and was one of the co-founders of the Podroom Gallery (1978–1980). From 1969 to 1976 he was dedicated to experimental film. He collaborated with the group IRWIN on the project Retroavangarde (1994). He is especially famous for his Exploitation of the Dead series (1984–1990) which has been exhibited at many shows, such as documenta in Kassel (2007).

== Exhibitions ==
He has had many exhibitions in Croatia and abroad, among the more recent being: The Cynicism of the Poor, Museum of Contemporary Art, Zagreb, (2001–2002), In Search of Balkania, Neue Galerie am Landesmuseum Joanneum in Graz, (2002), Blood & Honey – Art in the Balkans, Klosterneuburg, Vienna (2003), Sing!, Ludwig Múzeum (2011) and In the Gorges of the Balkans which was shown in the Kunsthalle Fridericianeum (Kassel, 2003), Platform Garanti Contemporary Art Center (Istanbul, 2007) and Van Abbemuseum (Eindhoven, 2008).

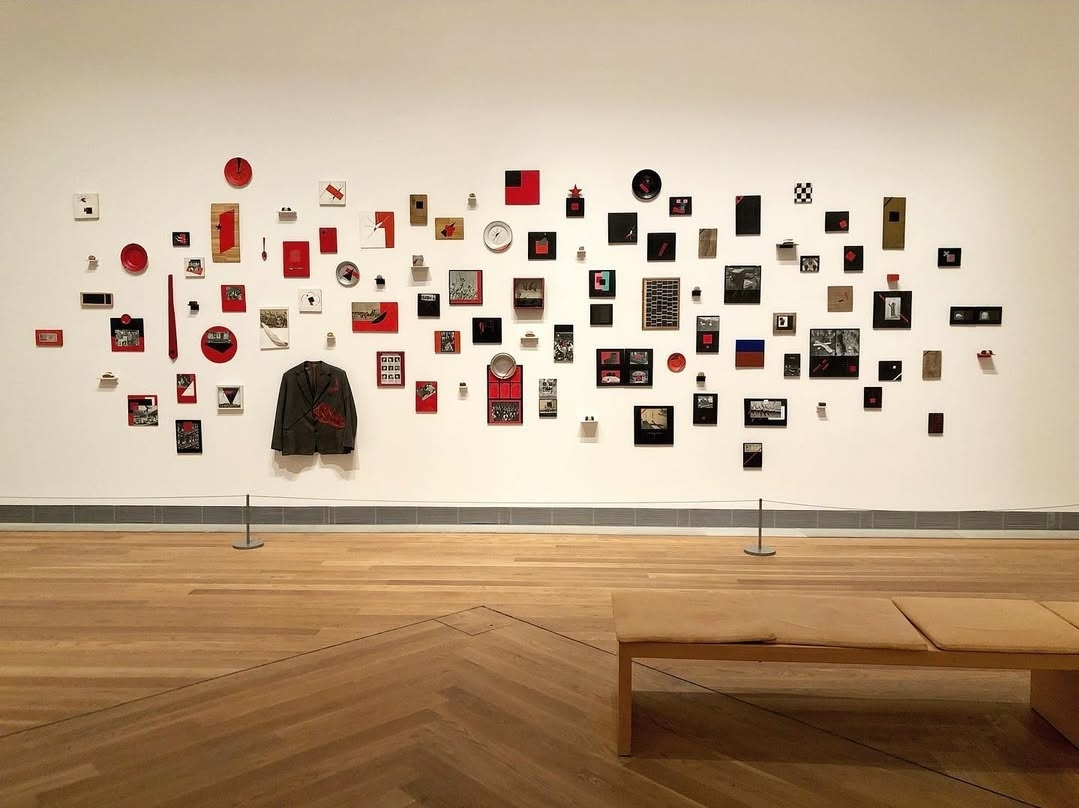
Mladen Stilinovic in Moderna Museet

Igor Zabel, the renowned Slovenian curator, chose him as a guest artist at the 50th Venice Biennale (2003) where Stilinović exhibited his work Dictionary – Pain (2000–2003) in which he used white colour to blank out many of the definitions of words in a dictionary replacing them with the word pain.. In 2017, he was selected as one of 120 artists in the world to participate in the 57th International Art Exhibition, VIVA ARTE VIVA, curated by Christine Macel.

His works belong to many museum and gallery collections, including the Museum of Modern Art, New York and Centre Georges Pompidou in Paris, museums of modern art collections in Stockholm, Vienna, Ljubljana, Zagreb and Banja Luka and in private collections such as the Filip Trade Collection, Zagreb.

== Works and publications ==
- Stilinović, Mladen, I Want to Go Home – Artist Book 1927–2006 (Centre for Women's Studies, Zagreb, 2008).
- Beroš, Nada, Milovac, Tihomir, Stipančić, Branka & Zabel, Igor, Mladen Stilinović: Pain (exh. catalogue, Venice Biennale, MSU, Zagreb, 2003).
- Beroš, Nada, Milovac, Tihomir & Dragojević Danijel, Mladen Stilinović: Exploitation of the Dead (exh. catalogue; MSU, Zagreb, 2001).
- Bryzgel, Amy: Artist Books by Mladen Stilinović (Part of the MoMA Library’s collection, 2017).
