= Mirić =

Mirić (Serbian Cyrillic: Мирић) is a Serbo-Croatian surname, derived from mir ("peace"). Notable people with the surname include:

- Marko Mirić (born 1987), Serbian footballer
- Milan Mirić (writer) (born 1931), Croatian writer
- Mitar Mirić (born 1957), Bosnian Serb singer
- Voja Mirić (born 1933), Serbian actor
