= Artuković =

Artuković is a surname. Notable people with the surname include:

- Andrija Artuković (1899–1988), Minister of Internal Affairs and Justice of the Independent State of Croatia
- Lovro Artuković (born 1959), Croatian painter
