= Milan Mirić =

Milan Mirić may refer to:

- Milan Mirić (writer)
- Milan Mirić (footballer)
