= Marijan Jevšovar =

Croatian painter

Marijan Jevšovar (1922 in Zagreb, Croatia – 1998 in Zagreb, Croatia) was a Croatian painter and founding member of the prominent 60s Croatian art group known as, Gorgona Group.

Jevšovar's explorations of the medium of painting led him to create an even further reduced version of informal art, something which may be referred to as anti-paintings. He was one of the founding members of the Gorgona group whose active members from 1959 to 1966 were Miljenko Horvat, Ivan Kožarić, Julije Knifer, Dimitrije Bašičević (who works under the pseudonym, Mangelos), Matko Meštrović, Radoslav Putar, Đuro Seder and Josip Vaništa. During the 1960s, along with his interest in grey and white surfaces, he also made drawings such as The Perfect Shape and An All-over Circle both of which reflect his philosophy of painting concerning the negation of traditional painterly values. These traditional values are instead replaced with an emphasis on the process of painting as the aspect of art more important than the final product. At the beginning of the 1970s he changed his art practice by introducing colours. He has also designed books and posters. He had solo shows in Opatija (1959), Munich (1960), Zagreb (1961, 1972, 1976, 1980, 1993), Dijon (1989), Varaždin (1990) and Umag (1993). He received the City of Zagreb Award for Artists (1995).

== Publications on Marijan Jevšovar ==
- Matičević, Davor Marijan Jevšovar – Drawings (Zagreb, 1993)
- Čanić, Nardi Marijan Jevšovar ( Zagreb, 1996).
