= Ivan Fijolić =

Croatian artist

Ivan Fijolić (born 1976, in Zagreb, Croatia) is a contemporary Croatian artist working primarily in the medium of sculpture. He lives and works in Zagreb, Croatia.

To date Fijolić has exhibited at some 30 group and 17 solo exhibitions. His works are included in the Filip Trade Collection and are also kept at the Croatian Chamber of Economy in Zagreb. He has received the Academy of Fine Arts Award for his diploma work Skirmish (Zagreb, 2001), the Rector's Award for the exhibition titled Check Your Head Out containing his sculptural piece titled, Twelve self-portraits (2004) and the 37th Mediterranean Sculpture Symposium Award for the work Hopscotch (Labin, 2009) which is awarded at the Croatian Sculpture Triennial. He has three realized public sculptures: Foundation Batta, Zlín, the Czech Republic, Black Foot, in the Park of Sculptures, Vrsar, Croatia, and the Mostar Bruce Lee statue, in the town of Mostar, Bosnia and Herzegovina. He has also made a sculpture series for the Krapina Prehistoric Man Museum in Krapina, Croatia (2009).
