= Ivan Kožarić =

Croatian artist (1921–2020)

Ivan Kožarić (10 June 1921, Petrinja – 15 November 2020, Zagreb) was a Croatian artist who worked primarily with sculpture but also in a wide variety of media, including permanent and temporary sculptures, assemblages, proclamations, photographs, paintings, and installations. He lived and worked in Zagreb, Croatia.

His works are characterized by a sense of mischief, spontaneity and by his nonchalant approach to life. He was one of the founding members of the Gorgona Group, whose active members between 1959 and 1966 were Miljenko Horvat, Julije Knifer, Marijan Jevšovar, Dimitrije Bašičević (who also works under the name Mangelos), Matko Meštrović, Radoslav Putar, Đuro Seder and Josip Vaništa. During his period in Gorgona, his sculptures reduced in form, which would become the main characteristic of his later sculptural project consisting of numerous sculptures entitled The Feeling of Wholeness.

He had many solo exhibitions, both in Croatia and internationally. Some of the exhibitions were held at the Museum of Modern Art in Paris (2002) and at the Art Pavilion in Zagreb (2005–2006). He participated in many international group shows, including the Venice Biennale (1976), the São Paulo Biennale (1979), and documenta in Kassel (2002). The Museum of Contemporary Art, Zagreb bought his entire studio for display in the gallery in 2007. Commissioned by the Filip Trade Collection, he made Ascent, a slender sculpture more than 13 meters high (2002). He was the author of many public sculptures, including Landed Sun in Zagreb (1971), A. G. Matoš in Zagreb (1978), and Tree in Bochum (1979–1980). He received numerous awards, including the Vladimir Nazor Award for Life Achievement (1997). A major survey at Haus der Kunst in Munich organized by Okwui Enwezor and MSU in 2013 was held in 2013.

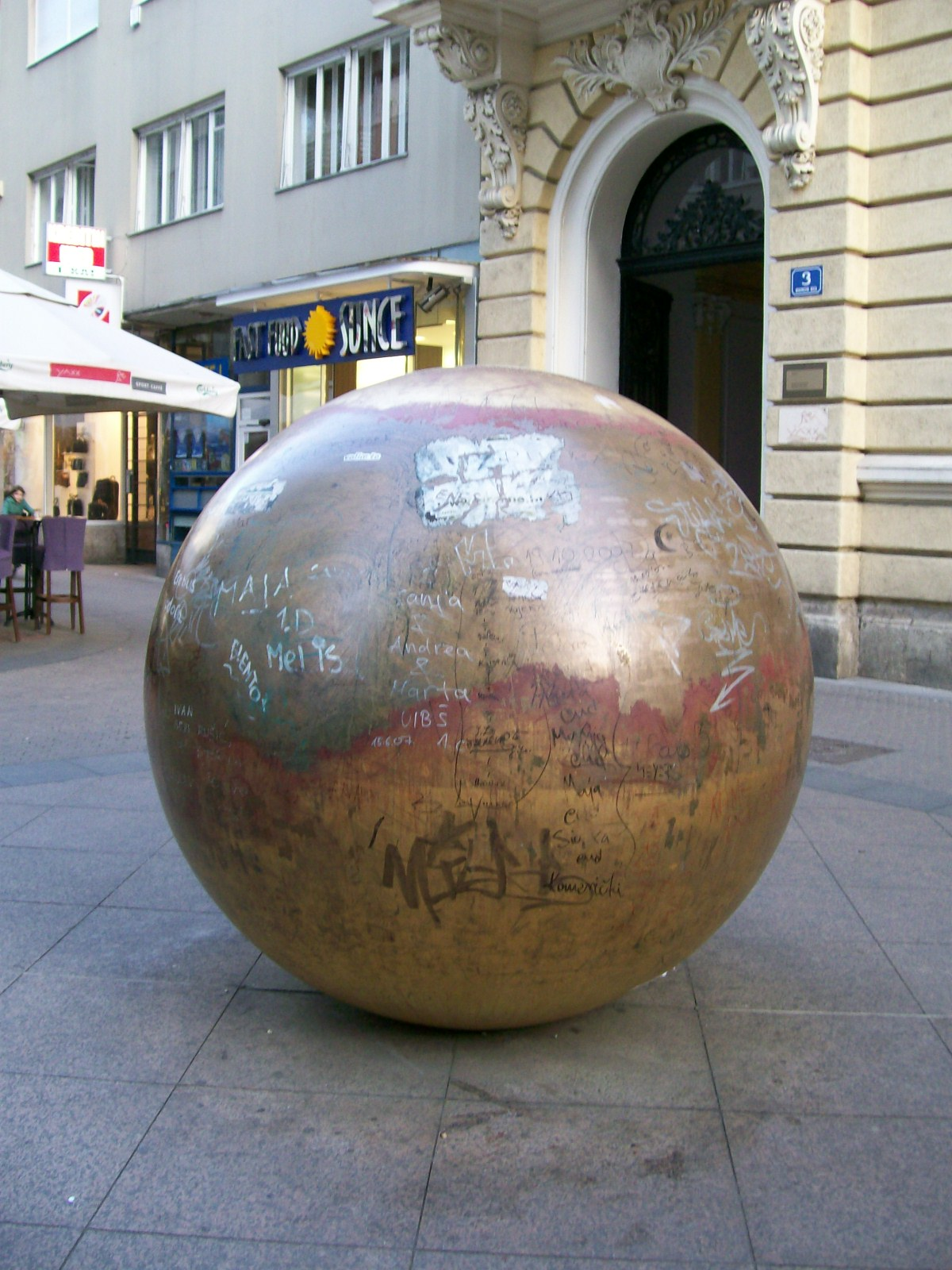
'Prizemljeno sunce'('The Grounded Sun', 1971) in downtown Zagreb, Bogovićeva street. Since 2004, it is a part of the installation Nine Views.

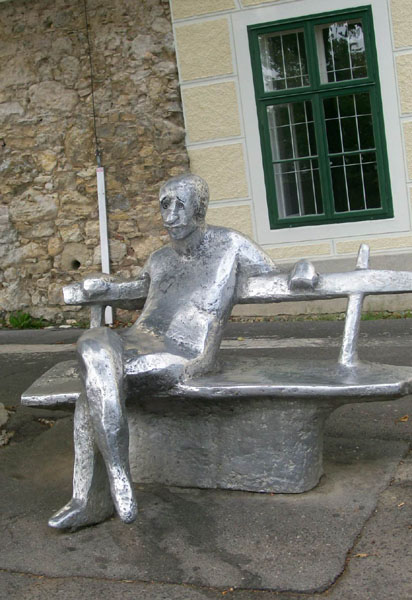
Antun Gustav Matoš statue on Strossmayер walkway in Zagreb

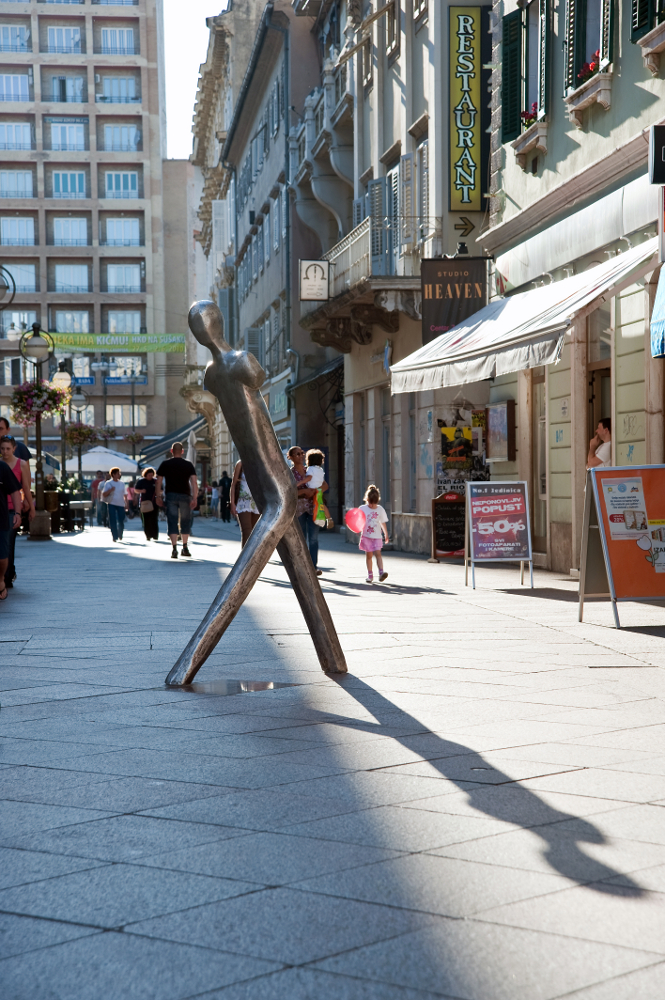
Walker statue on Rijeka main street Korso

== Works ==
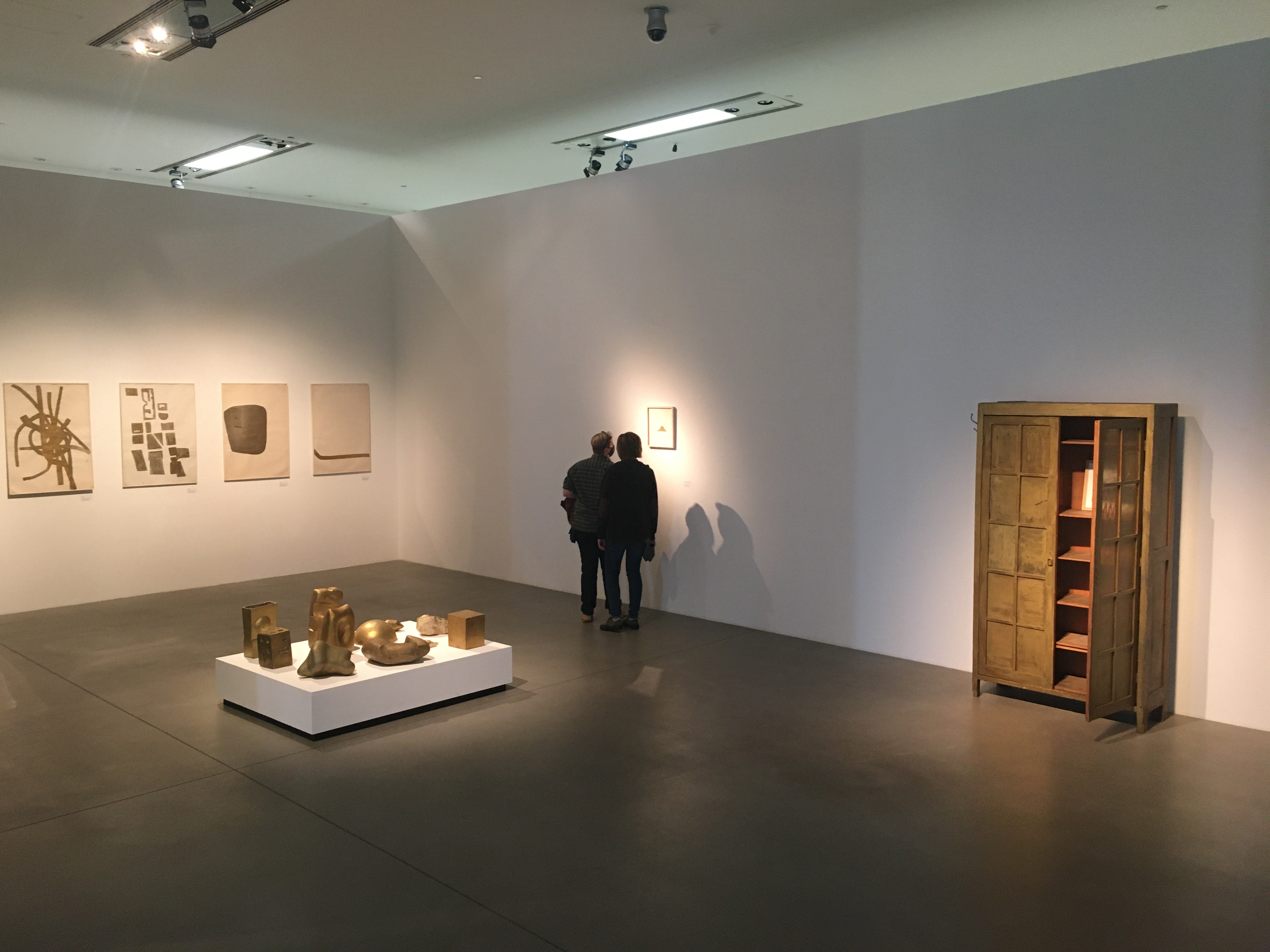
Ivan Kozaric Exhibition

Ivan Kožarić consistently maintained an open-ended approach to artmaking, refusing closure in both form and meaning. His practice was characterized by the continual reworking of earlier pieces, the revisiting of prior concepts, and the deliberate misdating of artworks as a strategy of resisting linear historical interpretation. In the 1950s, Kožarić primarily focused on the human figure, producing numerous sculptural representations of torsos, heads, and portraits. Concurrently, he explored abstract forms and ideas that would become increasingly central in later works such as Osjećaj cjeline (Feeling of Wholeness, 1953/54). His practice intuitively blurred the boundaries between figuration and abstraction, rejecting the imperative for categorical distinctions. A pivotal moment occurred in late 1959 when Kožarić spent six months in Paris and created Unutarnje oči (Inner Eyes, 1959/60), a sculpture that introduced his sustained engagement with negative space and introspective vision. His series Oblici prostora (Shapes of Space) further pursued this investigation by translating urban voids into positive sculptural volumes, proposing a formal inversion of emptiness and presence. In a 1963 text, Kožarić advocated casting the interiors of cars, apartments, trees, and parks—elevating the overlooked spatial recesses of the city into aesthetic form. His text sketches, often terse and handwritten, serve as diaristic expressions of his transient creative and existential states, marked by paradox and self-reflexivity. Works such as God, You Are Big! (2000) and statements like “That scares me!” (1987) reveal his productive self-doubt and resistance to artistic monumentality. In 1971, Kožarić enacted a radical gesture by painting his entire studio gold—including furniture, tools, and earlier works—thereby collapsing the distinction between art and non-art and challenging the presumed permanence of artistic value. His skepticism toward institutional hierarchies and aesthetic norms culminated in Hrpa (Heaps, 1976), a seemingly casual assemblage of major sculptures for the Venice Biennale that embodied his belief in creative renewal through dispossession. The conceptual roots of Hrpa can be traced to his early-1970s work Pinkleci (Bundles), which symbolized departure, transition, and the mobility of the artistic process. Later iterations of this clustering principle emerged in the form of assemblages from the late 1970s, composed primarily of mundane, everyday materials. In 1993/94, Kožarić relocated his entire studio into a Zagreb gallery, transforming the exhibition space into a lived and active environment—a gesture later reiterated at Documenta 11 in 2002. Following the acquisition of the studio by the City of Zagreb in 2007, Kožarić continued to reconceive the space, which now houses approximately 6,000 works, as a dynamic and mutable archive rather than a static monument to artistic legacy.

== Published works on Ivan Kožarić ==
- Maračić, Antun & Turković, Evelina, Studio Kožarić (Ideaimago, Zagreb, 1995).
- Župan, Ivica, Cheerful Sisyphus (Biblioteka Duchamp, Naklada MD, Zagreb, 1996).
- Koščević, Želimir, Kožarić (Naklada Naprijed d.d. Zagreb, 1996).
- Denegri, Jerko, Ivan Kožarić (Matica Hrvatska Sisak, Sisak, 2006.).
- Denegri, Jerko & Maroević, Tonko, Ivan Kožarić (exh. catalogue, Art Pavilion in Zagreb, Zagreb, 2006).
