= Vlado Martek =

Croatian artist (born 1951)

Vlado Martek (born 1951) is a Croatian artist whose work is based on visualising poetry. In his art pieces he works with poems and fragments of poems by putting them into collages, photographs, plots, graphics, sketches, drawings, art actions and agitations, graffiti and wallpapers. Vlado Martek lives in Zagreb, where he works as a librarian since 1979.

== Life and work ==
Vlado Martek was born in Zagreb (SR Croatia) where he studied philosophy and literature at Zagreb University. In the early 1970s Martek wanted more than writing poems. The first work he installed in public was a wallpaper-action with the photographer Željko Jerman and the art-student Boris Demur. In 1975 he founded the Group of Six Artists (Grupa šestorice autora) with Mladen and Sven Stilinović, Fedor Vučemilović, Boris Demur and Željko Jerman. Active until 1979, they performed over 20 art pieces in Zagreb and launched the magazine MAJ/75 (1978 – 1984).

Martek`s work is based on the discourse between art, philosophy and poetry. He is working with the negation and construction of words to create a reality behind the letters. He describes his work as Pre-poetry - the reduction and concentration of poem. In his own words: “Pre-poetry is controlling, an evasion into space before writing, controlling my head, my motives as to why I write, my responsibility, a tidying up before I write a poem. In that sense it is a provocation in language, by destruction but also construction.“ Martek uses critical, ironic and analytic methods to question social structures in combination with a wide range of media and materials.

== Solo exhibitions ==
- 1979: Elementary processes in poetry, Podroom, Zagreb
- 1980: Book-Work (with Mladen Stilinovic), Galerie Studentskog centra, Zagreb
- 1982: (Pre)poetry environment, Studio Gallery of Contemporary Art, Zagreb
- 1984: Vlado Martek, Galerija Skuc, Ljubljana
- 1985: Vlado Martek - Hermafroditski bojevnik, Galerija Skuc, Ljubljana
- 1988: Arbeiten auf Papier, Galerie Ingird Dacić, Tübingen
- 1996: Troubles with the Content, Galerie Zvonimir, Zagreb; Troubles with Ethics, Š-O-U-Galerija Kapelica, Ljubljana
- 1998: Samizdats, City Library, Zagreb
- 2004: Small Exhibition, Mala Galerija, Museum of Modern Art, Ljubljana
- 2008: Retrospective, Modern Gallery, Zagreb
- 2010: Poetry in Action, Galerie P – 74, Ljubljana & Gallery Kraljević, Zagreb
- 2011: Lisez Mallarmé, Galerie Frank Elbaz, Paris
- 2012: The Power of Support / Die Kraft des Untergrunds, Aanant & Zoo, Berlin
- 2014: Piktogramska abeceda, Galerija Galženica, Velika Gorica

== Group exhibitions ==
- 1976 :Confrontation, Gallery of Contemporary Art, Zagreb
- 1990: Zeichen im Fluss, Museum des 20. Jahrhunderts, Wien
- 1993: The Horse who Sings, Museum of Contemporary Art, Sydney
- 1999: Aspekte / Positionen, Museum Moderner Kunst SLW, Wien
- 2000: Chinese Whispers, Apex Art Gallery, New York
- 2002: In Search of Balkania, Neue Galerie, Graz
- 2003: In den Schluchten des Balkan, Kunsthalle Fridericianum, Kassel
- 2005: Collective Creativity, Kunsthalle Fridericianum, Kassel
- 2009: Who killed the Painting ?, Neues Museum Weserburg Bremen, Bremen
- 2010: You Are Kindly Invited To Attend, Aanant & Zoo, Berlin
- 2011: MULTIPLIZIEREN IST MENSCHLICH, Edition Block, Berlin
- 2012: The Present and Presence, Moderna Galerija, Ljubljana

== Literature ==
- Djuric, Dubravka – Suvakovis, Misko (Hrsg.): Impossible Histories: Historic Avant-Gardes, Neo-Avant-Gardes, and Post-Avant-Gardes in Yugoslavia, 1918–1991, 2003, ISBN 0262042169.
- Martek, Vlado: Volim Citati Poeziju, Zabreb 2001, ISBN 9536010941.
- Martek, Vlado: Predpoezija, Zagreb 2008, ISBN 953-734209-3.
- Martek, Vlado, Akcije pisanja, Zagreb 1997, ISBN 953-6010-48-8.
- Stipančić, Branka: Vlado Martek – Poezija u akciji / Poetry in Action, Zagreb 2010.
