= Klovićevi Dvori Gallery =

- Galerija Klovićevi dvori
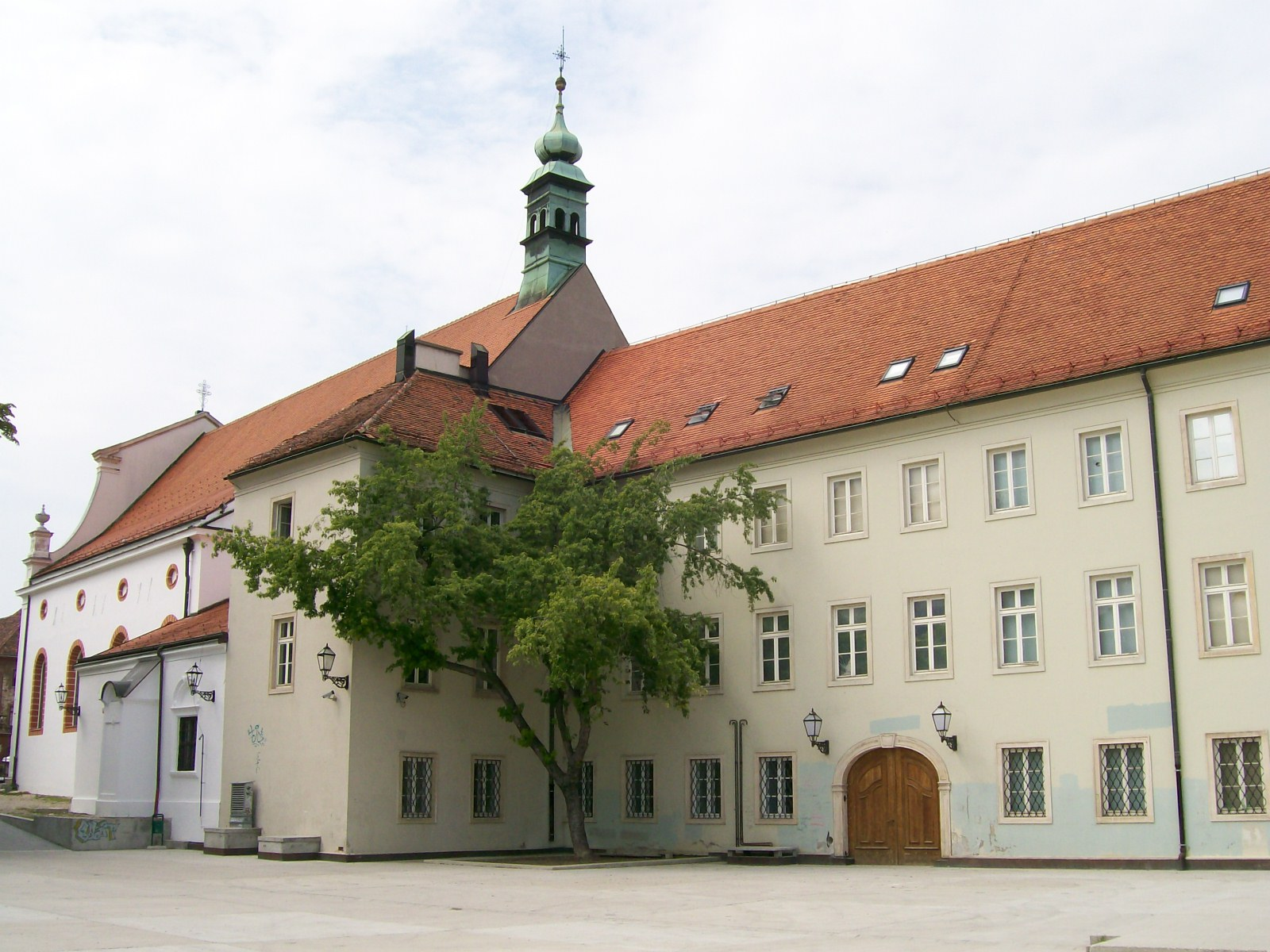
- Main entrance of Klovićevi Dvori Gallery at the historic Gradec neighbourhood in Zagreb
- Established: 15 March 1982; 44 years ago
- Location: Jezuitski trg 4, Zagreb, Croatia
- Coordinates: 45°48′55″N 15°58′30″E
- Type: Art gallery
- Visitors: 344,067 (2018)
- Website: gkd.hr

Klovićevi Dvori Gallery (Croatian: Galerija Klovićevi dvori, abbr. GKD, or simply Klovićevi dvori) is an art gallery in Zagreb, Croatia. Opened in 1982, the gallery is named after the 16th century Croatian-born artist Juraj Julije Klović, considered to be one of the greatest manuscript illuminators of the Italian Renaissance (the phrase "Klovićevi dvori" literally translates as "Klović Palace" or "Klović Hall").

The gallery is located in the building of a former 18th century Jesuit monastery in the historic area of Gradec in Zagreb's Upper Town, in the vicinity of other landmarks such as St. Catherine's Church, St. Mark's Square, Old City Hall, and Lotrščak Tower. The upper station of the Zagreb funicular is also located nearby, as well as the Museum of Broken Relationships.

Klovićevi Dvori Gallery had 344,067 visitors in 2018, making it the third most visited museum in Croatia.

== History ==
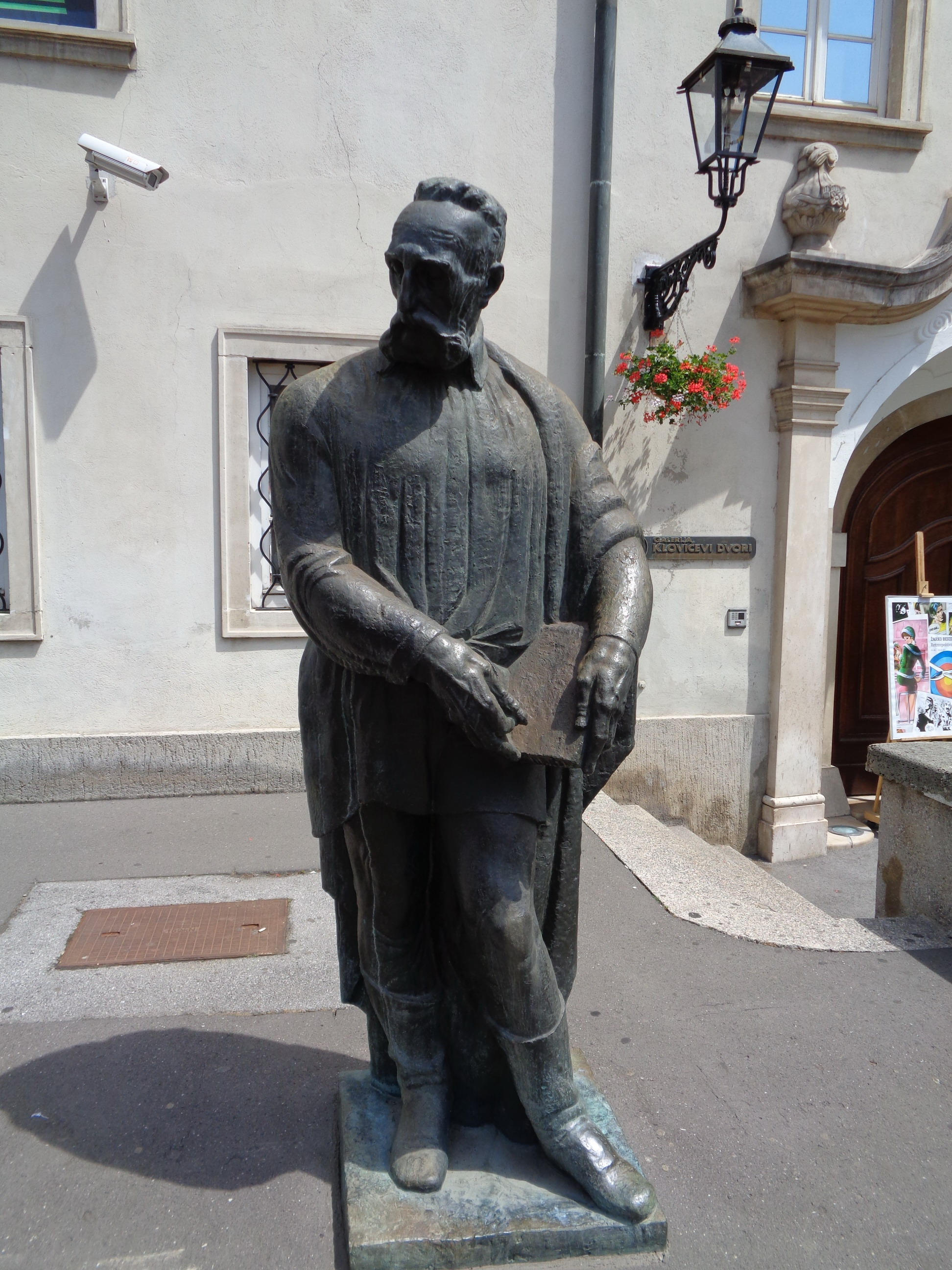
Statue of Juraj Julije Klović in front of the gallery entrance (since 2013)

Formally established in 1980 as a venue to house Ante Topić Mimara's extensive art collection, the former Jesuit monastery was adapted into an exhibition space in the following two years. But since the controversial collector was not satisfied with the choice of venue for his artworks, the gallery first opened to the public in March 1982 with shows that included major traveling exhibitions of international importance, such as collections of engravings by Albrecht Dürer, and works by painter Oton Gliha and sculptor Dušan Džamonja. The gallery's biggest success in its early years was a 1984 exhibition of ancient Chinese art, which featured 160 objects loaned from the National Museum of China and attracted hundreds of thousands of visitors over three months.

In 1985 the gallery expanded to the nearby Lotrščak Tower, and in 1987 the Mimara Museum opened. That same year, a fourth venue, Gradec Gallery (Galerija Gradec), also opened nearby. All four exhibition venues were managed as a single public entity, called MGC (Muzejsko-galerijski centar). In the 1990s the much larger Mimara Museum split off to become a separate entity dedicated solely to housing the Mimara collection, while the Gradec Gallery closed in the 1990s due to decay. However, the remaining two venues in Zagreb's historic Upper Town continued to function, with GKD and Lotrščak Tower hosting various kinds of travelling exhibitions of both Croatian and international artists. It produces some 30 exhibitions every year and is one of the largest such institutions in the country.

In cooperation with Hungarian National Museum in Budapest, Gallery organised two joint exhibitions: on 800-years of joint cultural heritage in 2020 and of 19-th century Croatian and Hungarian arts of painting in 2024, as a part of Hungarian presidency of the CEU.

== Gallery ==
=== Interior ===
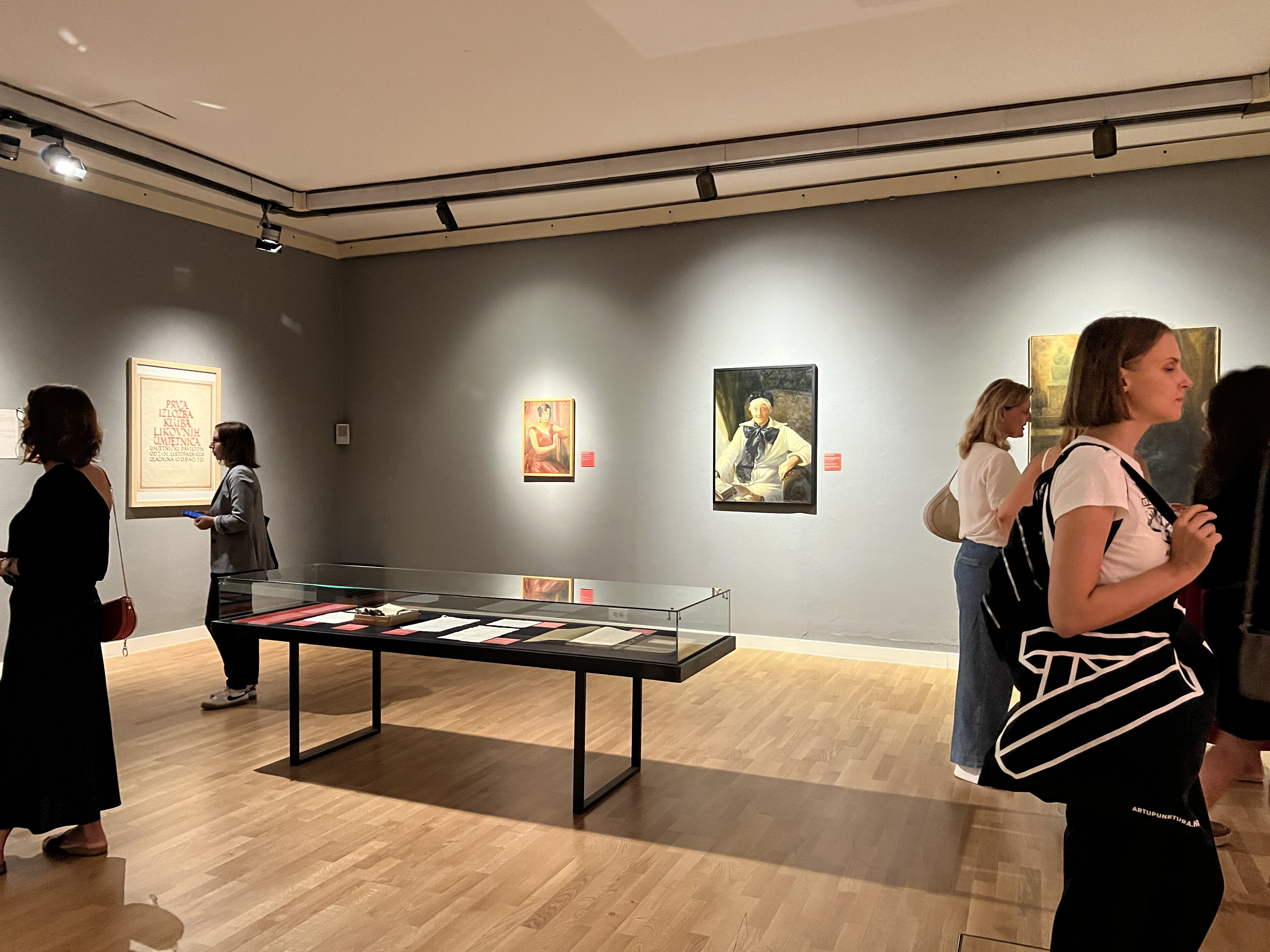

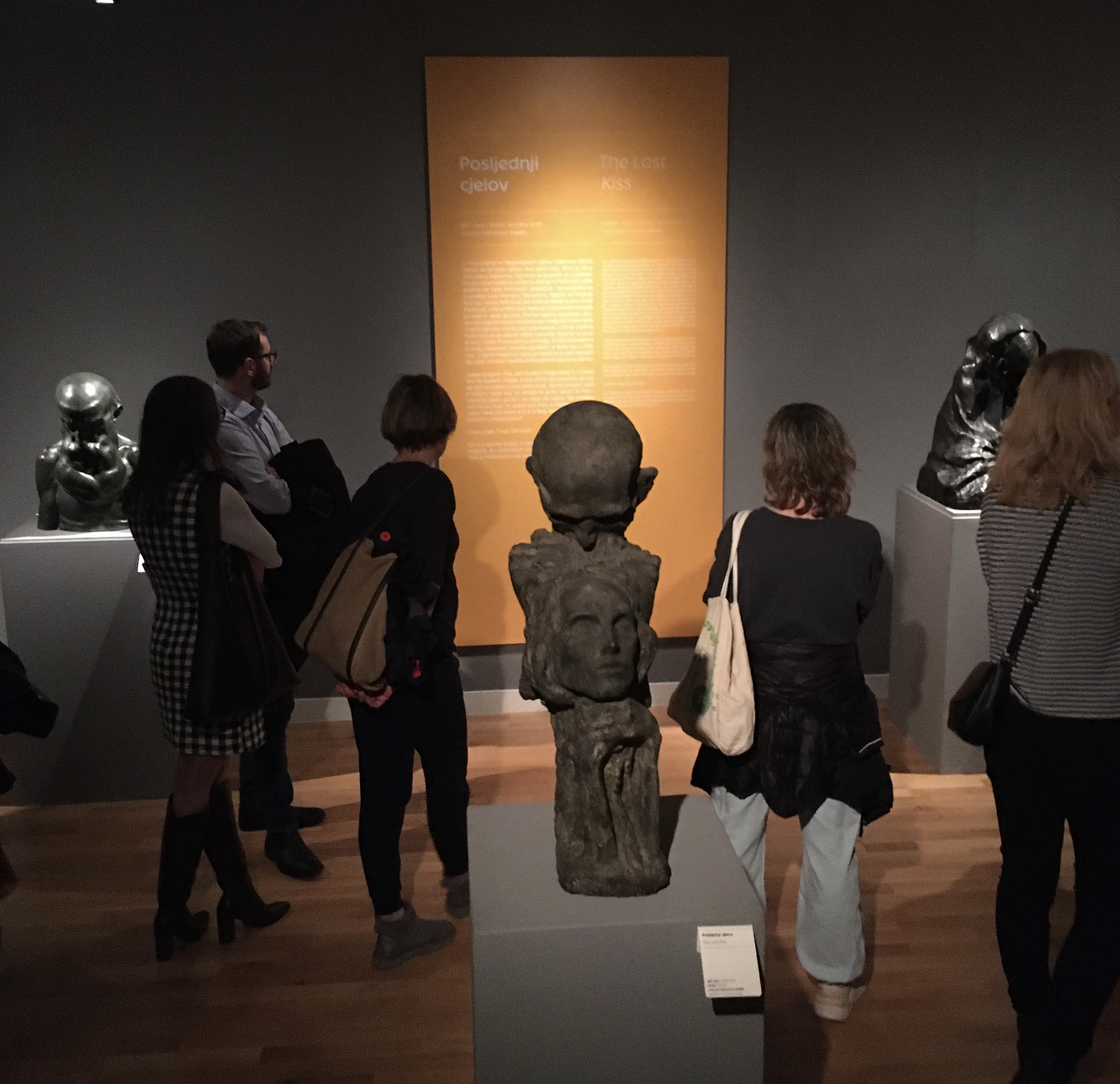

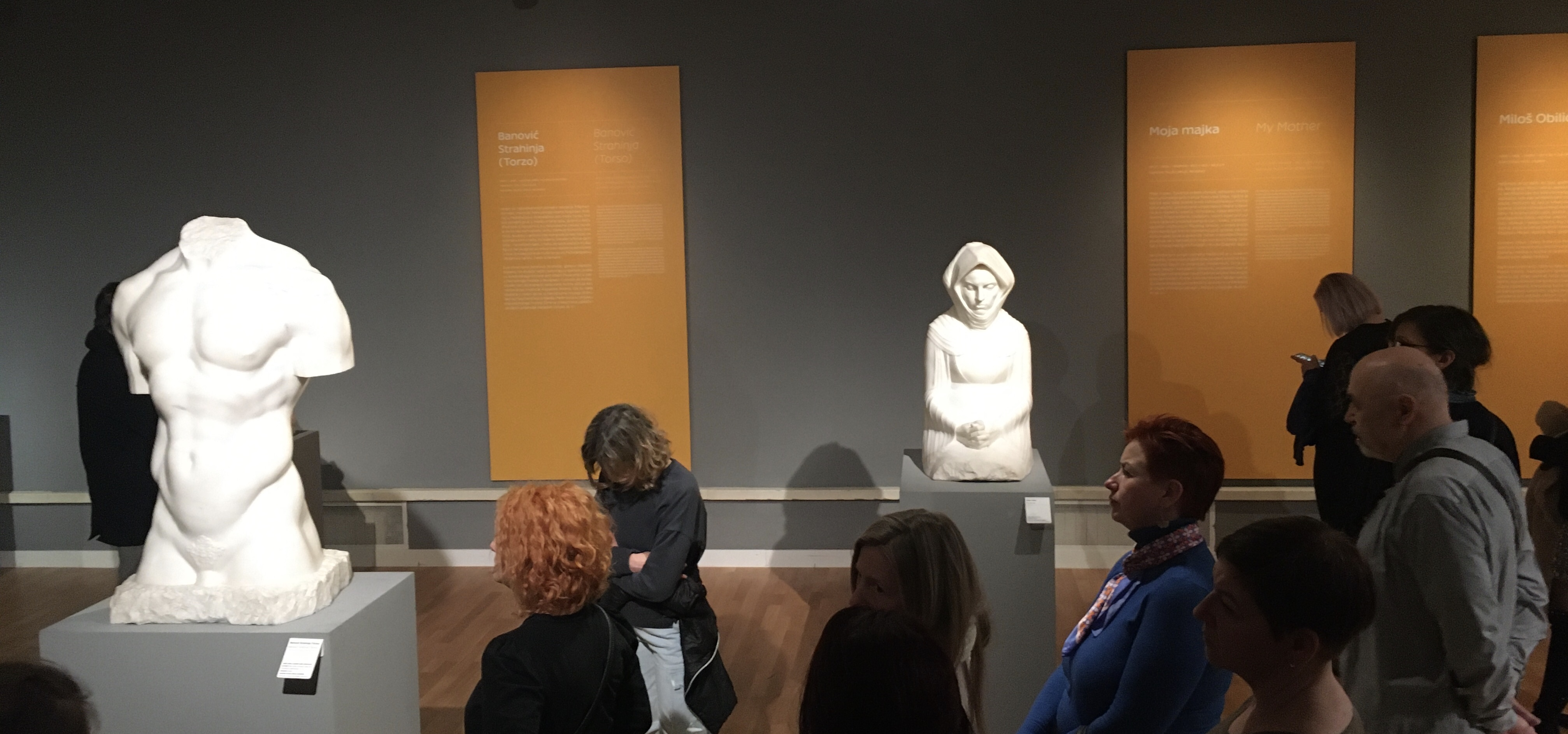

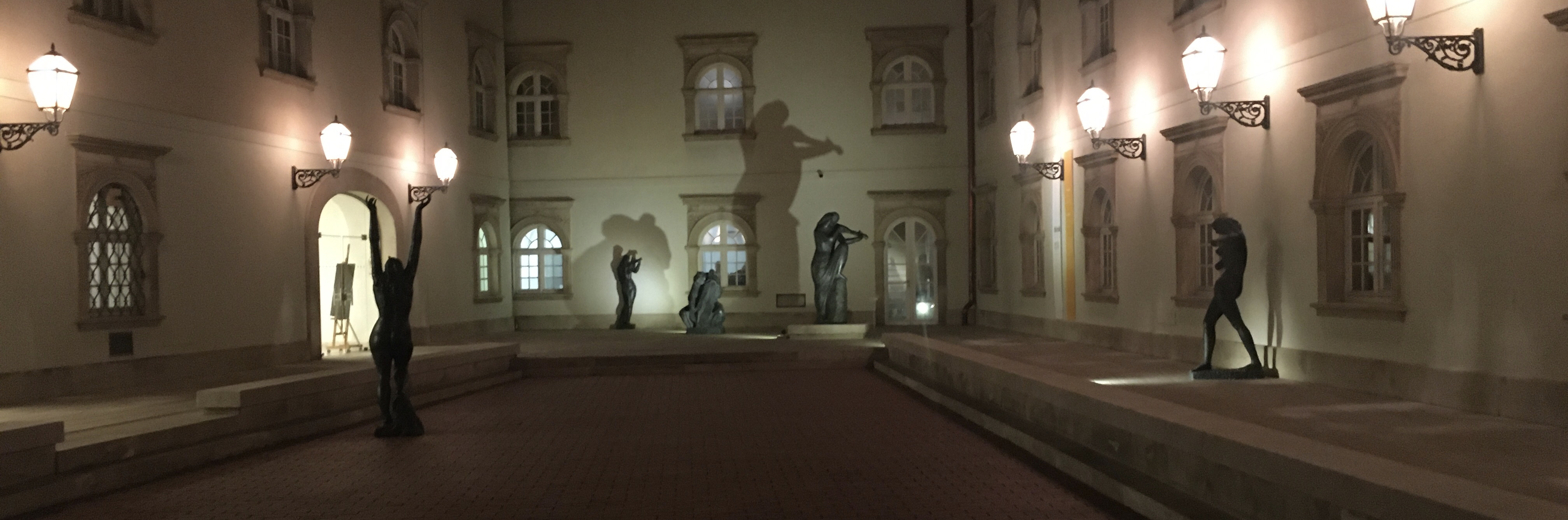

== See also ==
- List of Jesuit sites
