= Miljenko Horvat =

Artist, architect, poet, and photographer, born in Croatia

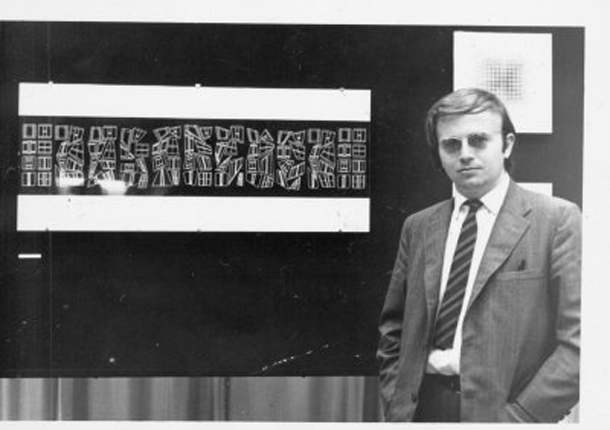
Miljenko Horvat at the opening of the International Computer Art Exhibition at Place Bonaventure May/June 1972 in Montreal, Canada.

Miljenko Horvat (1935–2012) was an artist, architect, author and illustrator, born in 1935 in Varaždin, now Croatia. He spent much of his career in Canada.

== Career ==
Horvat studied at Technical-architectural faculty of University of Zagreb, where Josip Vaništa was a professor.

Horvat began to paint from an early age, and during the study of architecture has become the youngest member of the avant-garde group with an international reputation, Gorgona. His work within the group includes various projects: Gorgona - Then and Now, Neo Dada: Gorgona | Absurd Freedom, Socialism and Modernity, Marginal Specificities: Avant-Garde Art of ex-Yugoslavia 1914 - 1989, Marginal Specificities – Regional Avant-Garde Art, Marginal Specificities – Regional Avant-Garde Art 1915 – 1989.

After graduating in architecture, he left Zagreb in 1962 to work in Paris, and in 1966 he moved to Canada.

Horvat's works are in numerous public, corporate and museum collections: the Musée national des beaux-arts du Québec; Canada Council Art Bank; Musée des beaux-arts de Sherbrooke; Spencer Museum of Art; Collection of Marinko Sudac in Zagreb, and others.

Few years after retirement he returned to Zagreb where he died in 2012.

Miljenko Horvat's work has been exhibited in over 150 exhibitions. He was active as a curator, designer and collector. He wrote and published poetry in the English language. His drawings have been published in several collections of the poetry of the Canadian writer and poet Alexis Lefrançois.
