= Siniša Majkus =

Siniša Majkus (born 1962 in Rijeka, Yugoslavia), is a contemporary sculptor who, using metal wire, creates sculptures which have the characteristics of spatial drawings. He currently lives and works in Matulji, Croatia.

Majkus graduated in 1989 at the University of Zagreb Academy of Fine Arts under the class of Miroslav Šutej. He is currently a senior assistant at the Faculty of Arts and Sciences, University of Rijeka. Siniša Majkus's works fall into the emergence of a new school of sculpture in Croatia during the 1990s. This new wave of sculpture focused on appropriating everyday objects and materials to create an aesthetic of the everyday. Majkus adopted metal wire as his primary sculptural medium. Majkus then twists and morphs the wire into three-dimensional forms as a pencil would draw line and create shape on paper, and it is for this reason that his works are often described as a ‘sculptural drawings’.

In addition to participating at many solo and group exhibitions, he is also the recipient of several awards, including the University of Zagreb, Rector's Award (1988), Second Prize at the Mediterranean Youth Biennale (1995) and the 6th Croatian Sculpture Triennial Award (1997). He also won the annual Vladimir Nazor Award for his exhibition, Embryo at the Art Pavilion in Zagreb (2004).

Siniša Majkus also has a number of public sculptures erected throughout Croatia. The earliest public sculpture, from 1997 is Putanje (Path) which is located in the Istrian town of Roč. In the capital city of Zagreb, the monumental sculpture Crvena stijena (Red rocks, 2001) stands commissioned by the Filip Trade Collection. Two public sculptures have also been positioned nearer his current home in Matulji. In Opatija the sculpture Linne was erected in 1998, and Nordkapp, 2003 is the most recent public sculpture commissioned from Majkus and it stands in front of the Cultural Society Zora in Matulji.

== Bibliography ==
- Valušek, Berislav - Siniša Majkus, (exh.cat. Galerija Karas, 1997).
- Vuković, Radovan –Siniša Majkus: Embryo, (exh.cat. Art Pavilion, Zagreb, 2004).
