= Lotrščak Tower =

13th-century fortress in Zagreb, Croatia

Coordinates: 45°48′53″N 15°58′23″E

- Kula Lotrščak
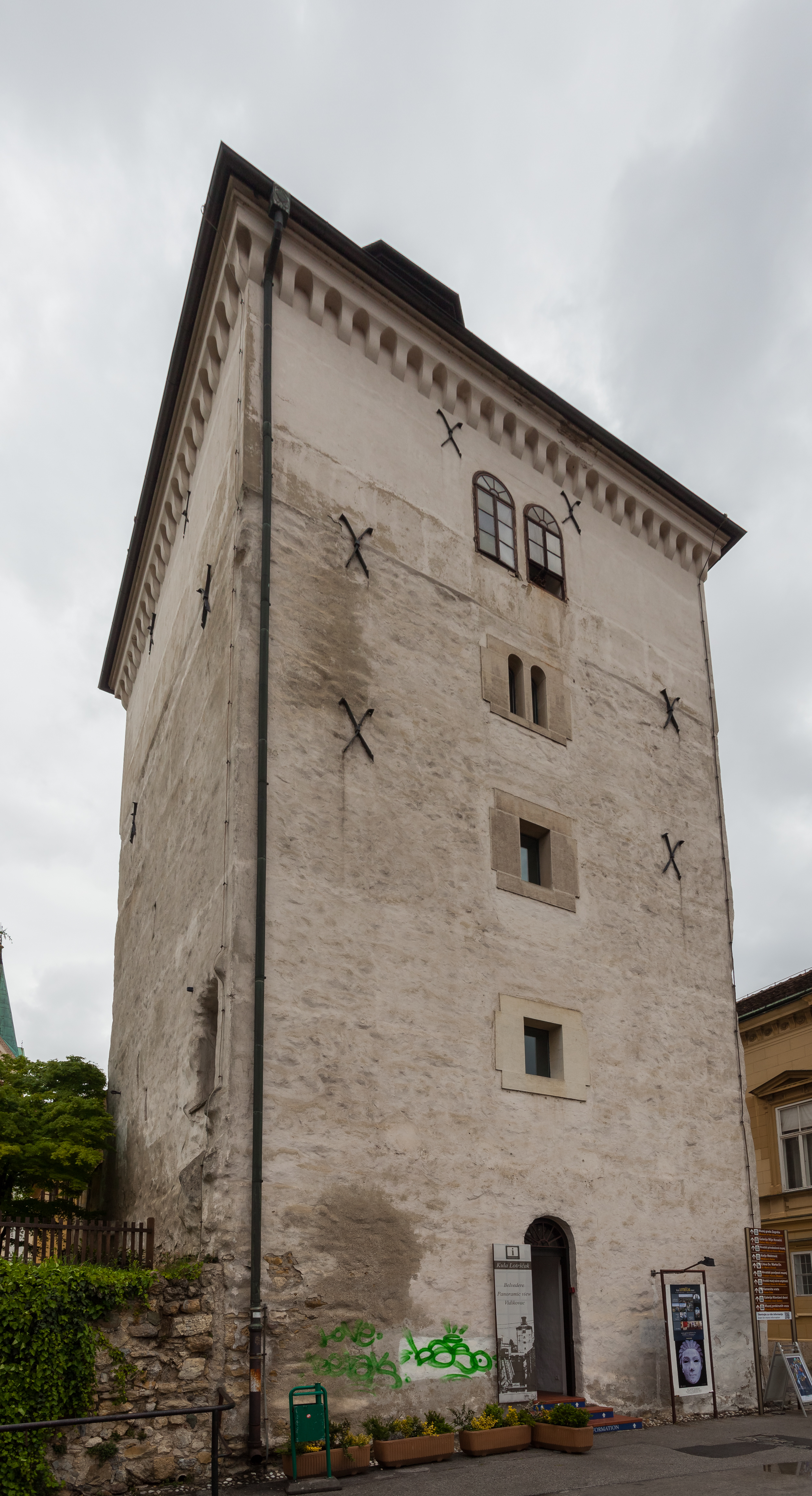
- South-west view of the Tower

General information
- Type: Fortified tower
- Architectural style: Romanesque
- Location: Upper Town, Zagreb, Croatia
- Completed: 1266; 760 years ago

Height
- Height: 30 metres (98 ft)

Technical details
- Floor count: 5

Design and construction
- Architect: Kuno Waidmann

The Lotrščak Tower (Croatian: Kula Lotrščak, pronounced [kǔːla lotrʃtʃâːk]) is a fortified tower located in Zagreb, Croatia, in an old part of town called Gornji grad (Upper Town). The tower, which dates to the 13th century, was built to guard the southern gate of the Gradec town wall. The name is derived from Latin campana latrunculorum, meaning "thieves' bell", referring to a bell hung in the tower in 1646 to signal the closing of the town gates.

The tower's fourth floor houses the Grič cannon, which is fired daily at precisely noon. Lotrščak Tower is also used for exhibitions and cultural and tourist activities, including photographic exhibitions related to Zagreb.

== History ==
In 1242, Croatian-Hungarian King Béla IV issued the Golden Bull, granting Gradec the status of a free royal city in recognition of the hospitality and refuge it had provided during his flight from the Tatars. The charter also required the citizens to fortify the settlement with defensive walls and towers. Construction of the fortifications lasted approximately twenty years and was completed in 1266. Lotrščak Tower was built as part of these fortifications. Its primary function was to defend the southern entrance to the city, known as the Dverce gate. The gate was demolished in 1812 during the redevelopment of the southern promenade, which is now known as Strossmayer Promenade.

The tower takes its name from a bell, known in Latin as campana latrunculorum ("bell of the thieves"), which was rung in the evening before the city gates were closed. The tower's medieval appearance is not fully documented. Based on several old drawings, it appears to have originally consisted of two floors, each with two windows, and a four-sided roof. The ground-floor entrance was located on the northern side, with an external staircase leading to the first floor.

=== 16th–17th century ===
Toward the end of the 16th century, changes in the tower's ownership and functions led to alterations to its appearance. The most significant modifications were made in 1857, during a period of Romantic-era restoration of medieval buildings. Two additional floors were added to the tower, and a polygonal wooden fire-observation turret was constructed on the roof. Due to limited funds for maintenance and repairs, the city sometimes leased the tower to private citizens on the condition that they maintain it. In the event of an enemy attack, however, the tower was to be returned to the city for defensive purposes. In this way, Lotrščak Tower was adapted to changing needs over the centuries. From the 17th century, the tower was used as a commercial storage facility.

=== 19th century and today ===
During the 19th century, a café operated for a period on the ground floor, with an entrance on the southern side. The building was later also used for residential purposes. Toward the end of the 19th century, the city administration decided to acquire a cannon that would be fired every day at noon, providing a time signal that could be used by the bell ringers of the city's churches. The cannon was first fired on New Year's Day in 1877. Its use was interrupted during the First World War, and it was fired again from 1927 onward. Since then, the noon cannon has been fired from a southern window on the tower's fourth floor.

Today, Lotrščak Tower is part of the Klovićevi Dvori Gallery public institution. The ground floor houses an art and gift shop offering souvenirs, art books, various objects, and unique jewellery. The upper levels include a viewing platform overlooking Zagreb.

== Cannon ==
The Grič cannon (Croatian: Grički top) is one of the Zagreb landmarks. In the 19th century, a fourth floor and windows were added to the tower and a cannon was placed on the top. Since 1 January 1877, the cannon is fired from the tower on Grič to mark midday. The cannon was to give the sign for exact noon for the bell-ringers of the city's churches.

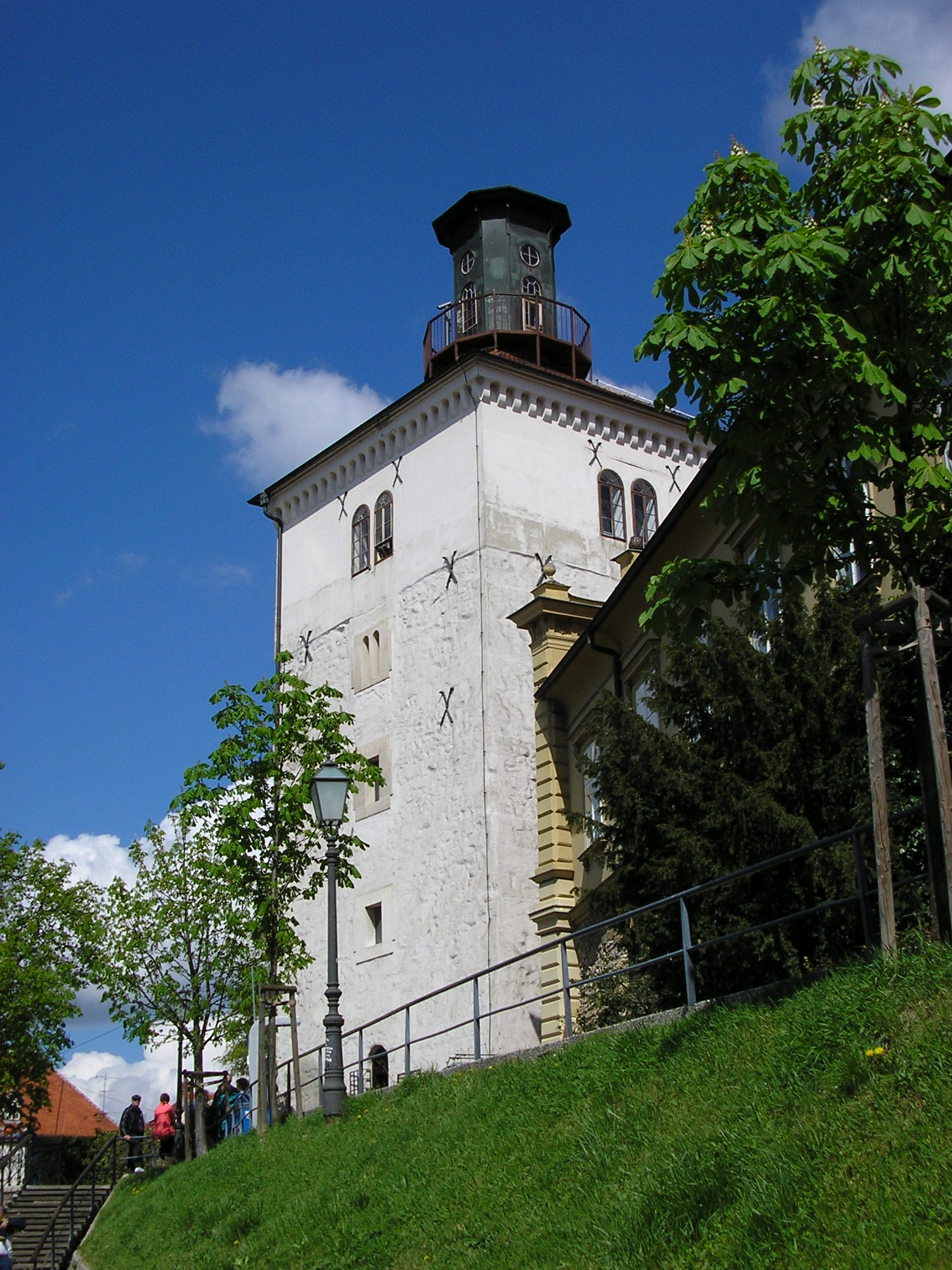
Lotrščak Tower

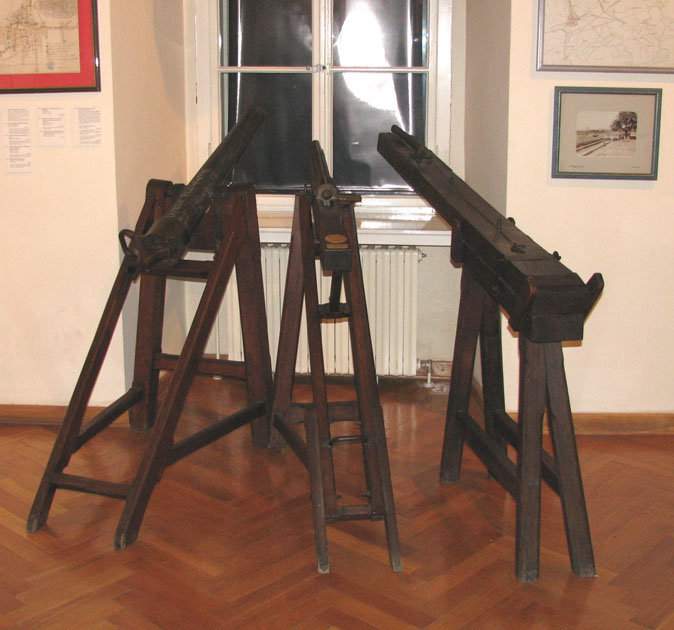
1st, 2nd and 3rd Grič cannons in Zagreb City Museum

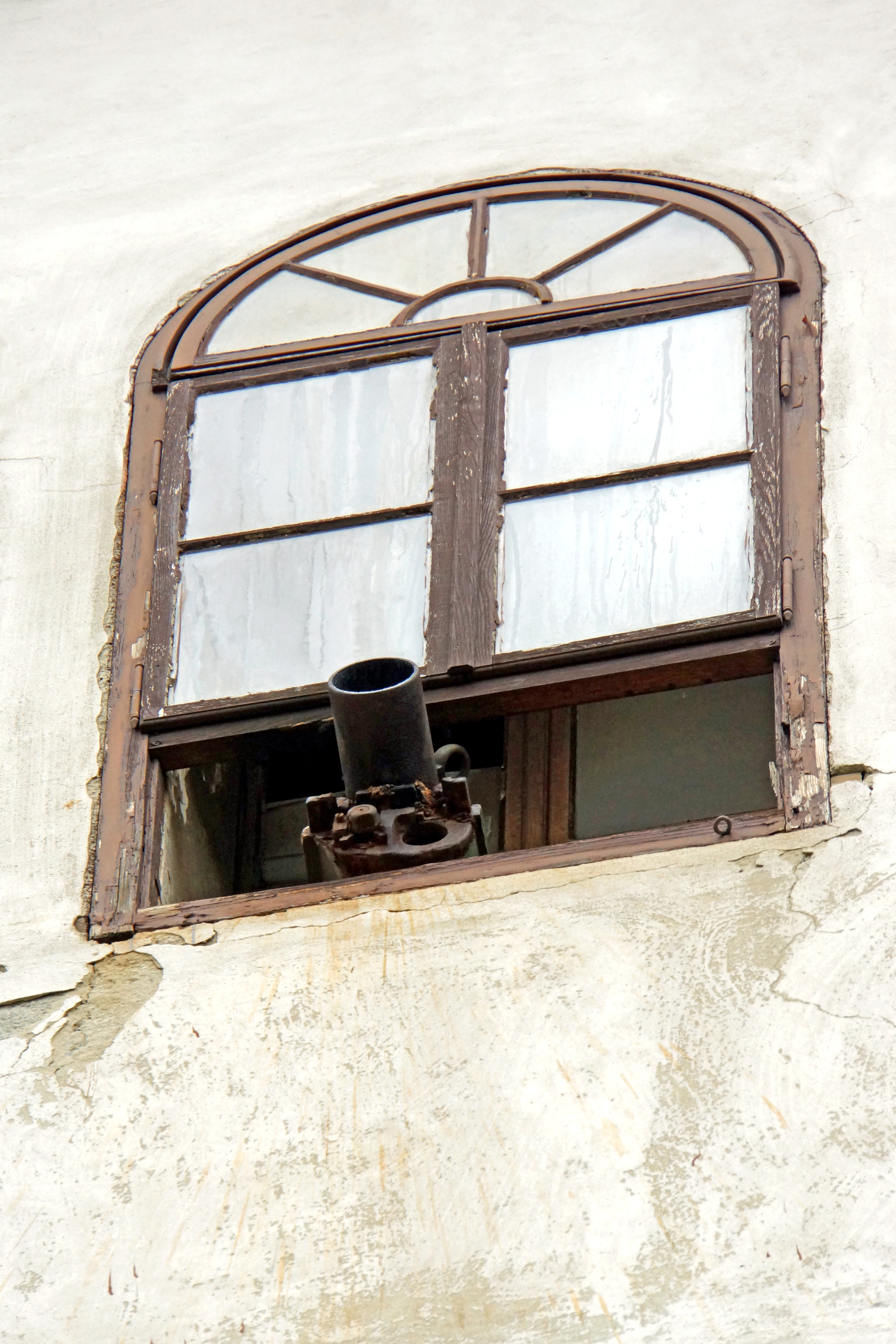
Grič cannon
