= Đuro Seder =

Croatian painter (1927–2022)

Đuro Seder (29 November 1927 – 2 May 2022) was a Croatian painter. He lived and worked in Zagreb.

== Career ==
Unutarnji razgovor (The Inner Dialogue, 1991)

At the beginning of his career he worked as an illustrator, image editor, and designer at various magazines. He was one of the founding members of the Gorgona Group, whose active members between 1959 and 1966 were Miljenko Horvat, Ivan Kožarić, Julije Knifer, Dimitrije Bašičević (who also worked under the name Mangelos), Matko Meštrović, Radoslav Putar, Marijan Jevšovar, and Josip Vaništa. During the Gorgona period he was more active in the group than with solo presentations, and his work was marked by the informel-influenced disintegration of form, negation of traditional painting techniques, and reduced use of colours, which can be seen for example in his works, Anonymous Form, (1963) and Little Signs (1964). Seder also contributed to the group's publication of the same name, and wrote texts and poetry in the literary magazines Razlog, Kolo and Republika. In 1978 his collection of poems Father from the Pot was published by BiblioTEKA in Zagreb. At the beginning of the 1970s Seder radically changed his mode of painting; he began using a wider range of colours, realistic figurative forms, and expressive gestures. He worked at the Academy of Fine Arts, University of Zagreb (from 1981 on) where he was later appointed Professor Emeritus.

He exhibited at many shows in Croatia and abroad, including: The Post-War Generation Painting, Art Gallery (Dubrovnik, 1960), Art Gallery (Split, 1960) and, Studio G (1960), Sixty Years of Painting and Sculpture in Croatia, Art Pavilion in Zagreb (1961), Đuro Seder, Gallery SC (Zagreb, 1964), Seder, Gavella Theatre (Zagreb, 1973), Informel 1956-1962, Gallery Nova (Zagreb, 1977) and the Museum of Contemporary Art (Belgrade), (1977), Arte contemporanea, Valle Giulia, Galeria Nazionale (Rome, 1979), Abstract Tendencies in Croatia 1951–1961, Modern Gallery, (Zagreb, 1981), Gorgona and After, Student Centre Gallery (Belgrade, 1986), (Un)recognizable Painting, National Museum of Contemporary History (Ljubljana, 1994), Đuro Seder Parisian Cycle – 1988, Gallery Forum (Zagreb, 2003) and, A Fight with an Angel, Gallery Arh (Rijeka, 2005) and at the Academia Moderna (Zagreb, 2009).

He received many honours and awards, including: the Vladimir Nazor Award for Painting (1986), the Medal of the Order of Danica Hrvatska with the image of Marko Marulić for his contribution to the arts, and the Vladimir Nazor Life Achievement Award (2002).

== Published works on Đuro Seder ==
- Kusik, Vlastimir & Rus, Zdenko, Seder (ArTresor studio, Zagreb, 2002).
