= Duje Jurić =

Croatian artist

Duje Jurić (born 1956 in Rupe, Croatia) is a Croatian contemporary artist and one of the key figures of the New Geometry movement of the 1980s. He lives and works in Zagreb, Croatia.

He was an associate of the Master Workshop of Ljubo Ivančić and Nikola Reiser (1982–1985). At the end of the 1980s he collaborated with Julije Knifer in making murals in Sète, a small town in southern France (1889 and 1990, Villa Saint-Claire). During the 1990s he supplemented his works with text and made artistic interventions upon various objects, either his own or objects belonging to others (such as doors, cabinets, suitcases, clothes, paint-brushes, etc.). In more recent years he has been involved with creating ambient, action and performance art. Jurić also works as an art restorer and in the period between 1977 and 1993 he was an associate member of the Croatian Conservation Institute. From 1984 to 1999 he worked as a freelance artist, followed by a position at the Museum of Contemporary Art, Zagreb (1999–2000). Following which, he has been teaching at the Academy of Fine Arts, University of Zagreb, first as an assistant professor, and now as a fully appointed professor in the Department of Painting.

He has had some sixty solo shows and over a hundred group exhibitions. He has also performed several actions and participated in a number of art projects, the highlight of which being his ambience art projects (light installations), and his theatre sets made for the Kugla Theatre project. He has received several awards, including the 2002 Croatian Association of Artists Award for Best Exhibition (for his exhibition in the Gliptoteka gallery, in the Croatian Academy of Sciences and Arts) and the 2002 Vladimir Nazor Award.
