= Boris Cvjetanović =

Croatian photographer

Boris Cvjetanović (born 1953 in Zagreb) is a Croatian photographer. He lives and works in Zagreb, Croatia.

From 1976 to 1984 he worked as a restoration sculptor at the Croatian Restoration Institute. From 1981 he started publishing his photographs in student papers (Student Paper, Polet). In 1984, he quit his restoration job and began his professional photographic career as a freelance independent artist. His development as an artistic photographer is linked to the PM group, (authors linked to the Extended Media Gallery, Zagreb). His photographs often focus on marginal areas of the urban social context.

Since 1981 he has had many solo and group exhibitions in Croatia and abroad. Together with Ana Opalić, he was the Croatian representative at the 50th Venice Biennale. He has also published photographs in numerous newspapers and journals. In Japan, he received the Nikon Camera Co. Award for his exhibition -ism '95, at The 1st Tokyo International Photo-Biennale. In Croatia, he received the Grand Prix at the Croatian Photography exhibition in 1997, along with the Homo Volans Award.

Cvjetanović's photographs are part of the collections at the Museum of Contemporary Art, Zagreb, Tokyo Metropolitan Museum of Photography, Croatian History Museum, Gallery Dante Marino Cettina, Museum of Modern and Contemporary Art in Rijeka, Art Gallery in Split, and in numerous private collections.

== Published works featuring Boris Cvjetanović ==
- Cvjetanović, Boris - Scenes without Significance, (Idea Imago, Zagreb, 1995)
- Bonami, Francesco - Echoes: Contemporary Art at the Age of Endless Conclusions, (The Monacelli Press, New York, 1996).
