= Milan Mirić (writer) =

Croatian writer

- Born: 14 November 1931; Gornje Dubrave, Kingdom of Yugoslavia
- Occupations: Novelist, playwright
- Writing career
- Language: Croatian

Milan Mirić (pronounced [mǐlan mǐːritɕ]; 14 November 1931) is a Croatian writer.

He attended primary school in Varaždin and Kraljevo, and a gymnasium in Kraljevo and Karlovac. At the Faculty of Humanities and Social Sciences in Zagreb he received a degree in 1956.

His earliest novelist attempts were in 1953 in Omladinski borac. Later, he published in periodicals such as Zadarska revija, Prisutnost, Književnik and Naše teme. He is one of the founders and editors of Razlog, a periodical published by Student Center in the period 1961-1968, along with a book series in which more than hundred works of domestic and foreign poets, novelists, critics, sociologists and philosophers were published. Works published in the series Razlog have made a lasting impression in the 1960s and 1970s Croatian literary life.

He worked as a professional "youth manager" (1957-1962), as a director of the cultural department of Student Center until 1974, as an editor-in-chief of the university imprint Liber until 1984, and finally as the editor-in-chief of the publishing house Naprijed until 1999, when he retired.

== Works ==
- Ostatak iskušenja, Biblioteka Razlog, Zagreb 1968
- Rezervati, essays, Biblioteka Razlog, Zagreb 1970
- Pisma iz rezervata, essays and feuilletons, Nezavisna izdanja, Zagreb – Beograd 1975
- Rosa, dramatic play, Prolog, Zagreb 1981.
- Priče o grčkim bogovima, (with Zlatko Šešelj), Zagreb 1988
- Olovni slog, short novel, Grafički zavod Hrvatske, Zagreb 1990
- Priče o grčkim junacima, (with Zlatko Šešelj), Zagreb 1992
- Rastureni rezervati, essays and feuilletons, Hrvatska sveučilišna naklada, Zagreb 2006.
- Eseji, essays, Matica hrvatska, Zagreb, 2011

For the last ten years he has been editing periodical Republika, together with Antun Pavešković and Ante Stamać.

== Awards ==
- Antun Gustav Matoš Award, 2013, for the book Eseji
- Foundation of Miroslav Krleža Award, 2013, for the book Eseji
