= Oton Gliha =

Croatian artist

- Born: 21 May 1914; Črnomelj, Austria-Hungary, Slovenia
- Died: 19 June 1999 (aged 85); Zagreb, Croatia
- Education: Zagreb Academy of Fine Arts
- Known for: Painting
- Notable work: Gromače (Drystone Walls)
- Movement: Lyrical Abstraction

Oton Gliha (21 May 1914 in Črnomelj – 19 July 1999 in Zagreb) was a Croatian artist, born in Slovenia. A graduate of the Academy of fine Arts in Zagreb, Gliha continued his studies in Paris, Vienna and Munich. He is best known for his series of abstract paintings based on the patterns of the drystone walls of coastal Croatia. The first in the series appeared in 1954, and it was a theme he developed for the rest of his life.

Gliha held solo exhibitions of his work in Croatia, and abroad. He participated in the Venice Bienniales of 1962 and 1964. Two retrospective exhibitions of his work have been held at the Museum of Contemporary Art in Zagreb.

Oton Gliha received the Vladimir Nazor Award for lifetime achievement in 1977. He was elected to the Croatian Academy of Sciences and Arts in 1998. Oton Gliha's paintings are held in public collections around the world, for example New York, São Paulo, Paris and Turin.

== Biography ==
Oton Gliha was born 21 May 1914 in Črnomelj, then in Austria-Hungary, today in Slovenia. His parents were originally from Istria, on the northern part of the Croatian coast. Shortly after his birth, the family moved to Osijek, where young Oton attended primary school. In 1924, the family moved again, this time to Zagreb. Completing high school in 1933, Gliha enrolled in the Academy of fine Arts, where he studied under prominent Croatian artists such as Maksimilijan Vanka, Tomislav Krizman, Ljubo Babić. He graduated in 1937, in the class of Marino Tartaglia.

While at the academy, Gliha met and married fellow art student Mila Kumbatović. Her family came from the island of Krk, where the couple would spend much of their time when not in Zagreb. The images of the island would make a strong impression on Gliha's art.

In 1938, Gliha participated in his first exhibition in Zagreb, and in 1954 held his first solo exhibition. That year, the painting Primorje (Coast) introduced the Drystone Walls cycle that would become Gliha's life work. In 1957, a second solo exhibition focused completely on his paintings of the Drystone Walls of Krk.

Gliha travelled and exhibited his work abroad, including several visits to Paris, Italy (in 1952 and 1961), USA (in 1958 and 1979).

In 1977, Gliha received the Vladimir Nazor Award for lifetime achievement in the visual arts.

In 1998, he was elected a member of the Croatian Academy of Sciences and Arts.

Oton Gliha died 19 June 1999 in Zagreb.

== Legacy ==
Gliha's early work during the 1930s and 40s were landscapes, portraits and still lifes, painted with in conventional, rather neutral colours. His landscapes showed the influence of Paul Cézanne, and he tended to use thick paint in an impasto style to describe the form in his still life subjects.

In the 1950s, lyrical abstraction was taking hold across Europe, with a new abstraction based on natural subjects. In 1954, Oton Gliha painted "Primorje", a coastal landscape that marked the beginning of one of the major series in Croatian art. His subject was the lattice of drystone walls (gromače), so common on the island of Krk, and along the Croatian coast. In Gliha's mind, he connected the patterns of the walls on the landscape with the ancient Croatian glagolitic script from early religious texts and stone inscriptions.

Gliha himself described the connection:

"All at once, I saw the image of that landscape from Krk, criss-crossed by drystone walls as an old tablet with Glagolitic script carved upon it. This association may seem strange, funny even, but for me at that moment it was fate. It helped me unravel all the excitement that I used to carry within myself, observing that strange geometry, architecture and sculpture that man had unconsciously created in his struggle with stone. By making most of the earth free of stone, man used the same stone to put it back into captivity, by fencing it off by drystone walls. When I stand within them I feel, I don't know why, very happy and filled by some silent festive joy. I feel the presence of a multitude of people and can hear their voices. Time seems to come to a standstill, reality becomes unreal. The faraway past seems to be the present; the present and future seem like the past: I experience an intense feeling of the presence of eternity. This spiritual state gives me power and stamina."

Gliha's excitement about his subject led him to interpret the motif in endlessly creative ways for the rest of his life. The shapes, rhythms and textures are caught in a variety of artistic styles and techniques, each one creating an individual mood from joyous to sad and reflective. During the 1960s and 1970s, Gliha utilized the motif to examine pictorial depth, the interaction of light and atmosphere, and the relationship between color and form. By this period, his stylistic development is considered to have reached full maturity. Gliha's motif became a constant in his art, and is immediately identifiable in all its variations. That is the indicator of all great painters when they have reached the peak of their life's work.

Oton Gliha's art can be seen in public collections around the world. The Guggenheim Museum in New York bought one of his paintings as early as 1958. Gliha held solo exhibitions in leading modern art galleries in Turin, 1960; São Paulo, 1961 and Milan in 1964. He participated at the 31st and 32nd Biennale in Venice and he also painted his dry stone walls as large compositions for public venues. For example, the frescos in the Federal Executive Council in Belgrade, 1962, the mosaic in the lounge of Krk airport, 1970, and the festive curtain of the National Theatre in Rijeka, 1981.

Since Gliha's death in 1999, two books have been published about his work. In 2002, a comprehensive monograph was released by Masmedia in Zagreb, containing an almost complete photographic record of his work. A second publication in 2011 by the Academy of Fine Arts, University of Zagreb assesses the importance of Gliha's work within Croatian Contemporary art.

In 2003, Croatian Post, Inc issued a stamp with Gliha's "Gromače 5-71" (Drystone Wall 5-71), 1971, as part of their Croatian Modern Art series.

Oton's relatives, Vilko Gliha Selan (1912-1979) was also a well known Croatian painter and illustrator, and Christina Gliha is following in the family footsteps as a commercial illustrator.

== Works ==
- Špiritijera (Spirit heater), 1939
- Primorski pejzaž (Coastal landscape), 1946
- Ljubice (Violets), 1952
- Smokve (Figs), 1953
- Krčki pejzaž - Omišalj (Krk Landscape - Omišalj), 1954
- Portret žene (Portrait of a woman), 1954
- Gromače (Dry Stone Walls) cycle, 1954-1999

== Exhibitions ==
Recent exhibitions of his work include:

=== Solo exhibitions ===
Gliha held solo exhibitions of his work in Zagreb, Rijeka, Belgrade, Ohrid, Sarajevo, Turin, São Paulo, Milan, and Genoa. He also participated at the 31st and 32nd Venice Biennial in 1962 and 1964.

- 2003 Oton Gliha - Krk Drystone Walls and the Croatian Glagolithic Script, Adris Gallery, Rovinj
- 1974 Oton Gliha - Paintings and Drawings, Museum of Contemporary Art, Zagreb
- 1964 Oton Gliha, Museum of Contemporary Art, Zagreb

=== Group exhibitions ===
- 2009 Alternative Landscapes of the 1950s to 1960s - From Nature to Vision, Art Pavilion, Zagreb
- 2008 From the Holdings of the Museum, Museum of Modern Art, Dubrovnik
- 2006 Croatian Collection, Museum of Contemporary Art, Skopje

=== Public collections ===
Oton Gliha's work can be found in the following public collections

Brazil

- Museum of Modern Art, Rio de Janeiro

Croatia

- Museum of Contemporary Art, Zagreb
- Gallery of Fine Arts, Split
- Museum of Modern Art, Dubrovnik
- Museum of Modern and Contemporary Art, Rijeka
- Rovinj Heritage Museum, Rovinj
- Filip Trade Collection

France

- Centre Pompidou - National Museum of Modern Art, Paris

Italy

- Gallery of Modern and Contemporary Art, Turin

Macedonia

- Museum of Contemporary Art, Skopje

Serbia

- Museum of Contemporary Art, Belgrade

United States of America

- Picker Art Gallery at Colgate University, Hamilton, NY
- Solomon R. Guggenheim Museum, New York, NY

== Bibliography ==
- Oton Gliha. Author: Zdenko Tonković; Photographs:Goran Vranić; Publisher: Masmedia, Zagreb. 2002. ISBN 953-157-102-3.
- Gromače by Oton Gliha. Text: Jure Kaštelan, Vladimir Marković, Zdenko Tonković; Photography: Krešimir Tadić. Published by SNL, Zagreb, 1983.
