= Gorgona Group =

Former Croatian avant-garde art group

The Gorgona Group (named after the mythological creature Gorgon), was a Croatian avant-garde art group which consisted of artists and art historians. The group, made up of Dimitrije Bašičević-Mangelos, Miljenko Horvat, Marijan Jevšovar, Julije Knifer, Ivan Kožarić, Matko Meštrović, Radoslav Putar, Đuro Seder, Josip Vaništa, operated along the lines of anti-art in Zagreb between 1959 and 1966. Beside individual works linked to traditional techniques, the members proposed different concepts and forms of artistic communication, ran a gallery, and published the "anti-magazine" Gorgona, which they distributed at no charge. In each issue, they featured one artist's work such as Dieter Roth or Julije Knifer. Works by the Gorgona Group are widely represented in a number of institutions in Croatia, including the Museum of Contemporary Art, Zagreb, the Filip Trade Collection, and the Marinko Sudac Collection.

== Selected exhibitions and participations of the group ==
- 1977 "Gorgona", Gallery of Contemporary Art, Zagreb; Municipal Museum, Mönchengladbach; Gallery ·KUC, Belgrade
- 1981 São Paulo Art Biennial
- 1986 Gallery KUC, Belgrade
- 1989 "Gorgona", FRAC Bourgogne, Art Plus University, Dijon
- 1993 "The Horse Who Sings - Radical Art from Croatia", Museum of Contemporary Art, Sydney
- 1997 "Gorgona, Gorgonesco, Gorgonico", Venice Biennale
