= Film Artists' Association of Croatia =

The Film Artists' Association of Croatia (Croatian: Hrvatsko društvo filmskih djelatnika or HDFD) is a trade union representing artists working in the Croatian film industry. Founded in May 1950 the association has around 400 members in its eight departments (one each for film directors, cinematographers, art directors, actors, film editors, producers, stunt performers and animators).

According to its mission statement HDFD seeks to encourage the freedom and quality of local film making; promote Croatian films; cooperate with similar trade associations; connect people involved in all aspects of film making; promote enforcement of intellectual property rights; participate in the creation of regulatory legislation concerning the film industry; negotiate collective bargaining agreements that establish pension and health plans for film workers and performers; and organize various film-related events and round tables.

The association's main governing body is the managing board made up of heads of HDFD's eight departments plus the association president and vice-president. Its current president is Silvio Jasenković.

The association participates in organizing events such as the "Croatian Film Days" (Dani hrvatskog filma, an annual festival usually held in April in Zagreb) and the Pula Film Festival (the annual national film awards festival held in July or August in Pula). HDFD is also responsible for selecting Croatian submissions for the Academy Award for Best Foreign Language Film.
