= Stanko Abadžić =

Croatian photographer and photojournalist

- Born: 1952 (age 73–74); Vukovar, Croatia
- Occupations: Photographer, Photojournalist
- Known for: Black-and-white art photography
- Notable work: In Absentia, U ogledalu života (In The Mirror of Life)

Stanko Abadžić (born 1952 in Vukovar) is a Croatian photographer and photojournalist. He lives and works in Zagreb, Croatia.

== Career ==
Stanko Abadžić began his professional career in photography as a photojournalist for the Croatian daily newspaper Vjesnik. During that period he made well-known reportages from Tunisia, Malta, Turkey and other countries. After the onset of the Croatian war of independence in 1991, Abadžić moved abroad and would not return to Croatia for many years. After four years in Germany, he spent seven years in the Czech Republic in Prague, a city which had the greatest impact on his artistic expression. At this point in his career he moved away from photojournalism towards art photography. In the Czech Republic he participated in numerous group and solo exhibitions, the largest of which was a retrospective exhibition at the gallery Dom Jozefa Sudka in Prague, on which occasion his first monograph U ogledalu života (In The Mirror of Life) was published. In 2002 he returned to Croatia and the Croatian photography scene with a large exhibition at the Mimara Museum, where he exhibited In Absentia, his most famous series from Prague. As an art photographer Abadžić's works almost exclusively in black-and-white film, evoking a sense of nostalgia and times gone by in his works. The artist also cites the influence of old masters of photography like Henri Cartier-Bresson.

Abadžić has had solo exhibitions in numerous European countries: the Czech Republic, Croatia, Germany, Portugal, Switzerland and Spain, to name a few. He has also exhibited outside of Europe in Argentina, the US and Japan. He has received professional recognition as well as many awards for his work. Abadžić's photographs are part of collections at the Modern Gallery, Zagreb and the Modern Gallery, Rijeka, Croatia, the Umelecko-průmyslová Museum in Prague, the Czech Republic, Catherine Couturier Gallery in Houston, USA, the Verve Gallery of Photography in Santa Fe, New Mexico, USA, the Stockeregg gallery, Switzerland, Kazutami Ando, Tokyo, Japan, as well as in other private and public collections.

== Publications on Stanko Abadžić ==
- Lah, Nataša Šegota, Stanko Abadžić, English Translations by: Tomislav Kuzmanović, (Zaprešić : Fraktura, 2007).
- Abadžić, Stanko, Marginalije/ Visual Wanderings, English translations by:Boris Gregorić, (Meandarmedia, 2009).
