= Republika (Croatian magazine) =

Croatian monthly magazine

Republika is a Croatian monthly magazine for literature, art and society. Established in 1945, it is published by Croatian Writers' Association and the Školska knjiga publishing company.

== Timeline ==
- from 1945: monthly magazine for literature, art and public life
- from 1947: monthly magazine for literature, art and public issues
- from 1949: magazine for literature and art
- from 1972: magazine for cultural and social issues
- from 1983. to nr. 1/2003: magazine for literature
- from 2003. (nr.1) - today: monthly magazine for literature, art and society

== Editors ==
- 1945: Miroslav Krleža, Vjekoslav Kaleb, Joža Horvat
- 1946: Vjekoslav Kaleb
- 1947-1948: Marin Franičević
- 1949: Ivan Dončević
- 1950-1951: Ivan Dončević, Marin Franičević, Jure Kaštelan
- 1952: Ivan Dončević, Marin Franičević
- 1953-6/1954: Ivan Dončević, Marin Franičević, Vlatko Pavletić
- 7/1954.-1955: Ivan Dončević, Marin Franičević
- 1955: Ivan Dončević, Marin Franičević, Novak Simić
- 1956-8/1971: Ivan Dončević
- 9/1971.-1972: Danilo Pejović
- 1972: Ivan Raos, Stojan Vučičević
- 1973-1979: Zvonimir Majdak
- 1980-1981: Augustin Stipčević
- 1982-1986: Branko Maleš
- 1986- nr.7-9/2002: Velimir Visković
- 2002- today: Ante Stamać
