= Lovro Artuković =

Croatian painter and graphic artist

Lovro Artuković (born in 1959 in Zagreb) is a contemporary Croatian painter and graphic artist who primarily paints large scale figurative canvases. He lives and works in Berlin, Germany.

== Artistic career ==
For nine years, until 2003, he worked as an assistant professor at the Academy of Fine Arts, University of Zagreb. He then moved to Berlin where he still works as a freelance artist.

His painting style is based on the theme of intimism and explores the figurative using the iconography of urban civilisation. In the 1980s many of his works focused on portraiture and the artist's wife figures as the most prominent sitter. His works then developed through the 1990s, although never directly painting the war which he experienced, (Croatian War Independence) his self-portraits and portraits of couples of this period reflected an atmosphere of war.

== Exhibitions and awards ==
He has had numerous group and solo exhibitions, including:

- Museu da Água, Lisbon (2002).
- The Repository, the Textile Factory Zagreb TKZ (2004).
- Zero-gravity Paintings, Labor 019, Berlin (2004).
- Painting and Object, Artists' Gallery, Dubrovnik (2004).
- Observation, Prima Center, Berlin (2005).
- 64, Josip Račić Gallery, Zagreb (2006).
- Ball of Fame, Umspannwerk, Berlin (2006).
- Declaration, Haus Ungarn/.BHC Kollektiv, Berlin (2008).
- Island Map, Gallery Klovićevi dvori, Zagreb, (2008).
- The Best Paintings, Gallery Klovićevi dvori, Zagreb (2008). A selection of the artist's works from 1984 - 2008.
- Gledati druge / Looking at Others, Art Pavilion in Zagreb, (2009).

Awards:

- Artuković received the Croatian Society of Artists Award for best exhibition in 2001.

== Films inspired by Lovro Artuković ==
- The experimental film Theft, (2004), directed by Lukas Nola was inspired by the theft of the artist's works during an exhibition in Spain in 2002.
- The documentary film L.A. Unfinished, (2008), by Igor Mirković.

== Published works on Lovro Artuković ==
- Purgar, Krešimir - The Neo-baroque Subject, (Meandarmedia 2007).
- Perica, Blaženka - The Best Paintings, (exh. Cat, Klovićevi dvori Gallery, Zagreb, 2008).
