= Julije Knifer =

Croatian abstract painter

Julije Knifer (23 April 1924 – 7 December 2004) was a Croatian abstract painter and a founding member of the 1960s Croatian art collective known as the Gorgona Group.

Meandar (oil on canvas, 1961/1962)

The central motif of Knifer's art is the exploration of meander, a geometric form which he had been creating since 1960 in various painting techniques such as print, oil, acrylic paint, collage and mural. An example of which is the colossal meander created by Knifer on a 20 x 30 m canvas in a quarry in Tübingen (1975).

He was also one of the founding members of the Gorgona Group, whose members from 1959 to 1966 were: Miljenko Horvat, Ivan Kožarić, Marijan Jevšovar, Dimitrije Bašičević (who works under the name Mangelos), Matko Meštrović, Radoslav Putar, Đuro Seder and Josip Vaništa. In 1961 he participated at the first New Tendencies’ exhibition in Zagreb. He exhibited at many national and international shows including, The New Tendencies exhibitions (1961, 1963, 1969 and 1973), Art Abstrait Constructif International at the Denise René Gallery (Paris, 1961–1962), Konstruktivisten at the Städtisches Museum Leverkusen (Leverkusen, 1962), Oltre l’informale (San Marino, 1963), the Venice Biennale (1976 and 2001), the São Paulo Art Biennale (1973 with Juraj Dobrović and Vjenceslav Richter, 1979 and 1981). He collaborated with the Dany Keller Gallery in Munich, the Hoffmann Gallery in Friedberg, and nowadays his work is represented by Gregor Podnar in Vienna and Frank Elbaz Gallery in Paris. This increased the number of his works in private and museum collections which are now held in many prominent institutions across the world including the Centre Georges Pompidou in Paris.

In 1994 he moved to Paris, where he lived until his death. His first posthumous exhibition was organized by Arnauld Pierre at the Frank Elbaz Gallery in Paris (2010). In 2002 he was the recipient of the Vladimir Nazor Life Achievement Award.

In 2016, Knifer's painting PLS 69 (1969) was sold in an auction in Vienna for €137,000, which was at the time the highest price ever paid for a work of Croatian modern art.
