= Željko Jerman =

Željko Jerman (born 1949 in Zagreb, Croatia, died, 2006 in Korčula, Croatia) was a Croatian photographer who experimented the possibilities of photography as a medium.

He was one of the founding members of the informal neo-avantgarde Grupa šestorice autora (Group of Six Authors), together with Vladimir Martek, Boris Demur, Mladen Stilinović, Sven Stilinović and Fedomir Vučemilović. The group was active in Zagreb from 1975 to 1979. Together with the Group of Six Authors Jerman made action-exhibitions in public spaces for example, the bathing-area on the river Sava, the Republic Square and the Faculty of Philosophy in Zagreb, in addition to exhibitions in galleries. They organized a total of 21 action-exhibitions during the group’s active period. In that period Jerman experimented with photography producing grey, unfocused photographs. He also created photo collages, making further interventions with the media by using different photo techniques, photo chemicals, texts, drawings, colours etc. He would also frequently cut and partially burn the final products. Further experimentation lead him to apply chemicals directly onto the photo surface without the use of a camera. He also became interested in multimedia art and started using text more frequently in his work. One of his most famous installations is This is not my world, a sentence that he wrote on photo paper with developer in 1976, and exhibited on a street in Belgrade.

He co-founded the Working Association of Artists active in the space Podroom (Mesnička 12, Zagreb). Later he also initiated the formation of the Extended Media Gallery as part of HDLU (Croatian Association of Artists) in Zagreb. From 1979 to 1983 he made artistic performances with his wife and fellow artist Vlasta Delimar for example, Attempts of Identification in 1979 and Weddings in 1982. He was a teacher at the Free Art Academy in Split (1998–2001) where he also lived at the time. In 1999 he started the Ghetto Gallery in Split.

Jerman wrote theoretical and critical texts and columns published in newspapers and socio-cultural magazines, including: Jerman’s column published in Polet, Studentski list, a student paper (1988), a series of feuilletons about art and artists from the 1970s and 1980s in the daily newspaper Jutarnji list (2000), Lost Portraits also published in Jutarnji list (2002–2003) and the column Egotrip in the cultural magazine Zarez (2002–2006). During his artistic career he exhibited at many solo and group exhibitions in Croatia and abroad.

== Published works on Željko Jerman ==
- Denegri, Jerko, Janković, Radmila Iva, Laysiepen-Ulay, Uwe, Logar, Tevž & Šimičić, Darko, Željko Jerman, (Gallery Škuc, Ljubljana, 2008).
