= Dimitrije Bašičević =

Yugoslavian artist and curator

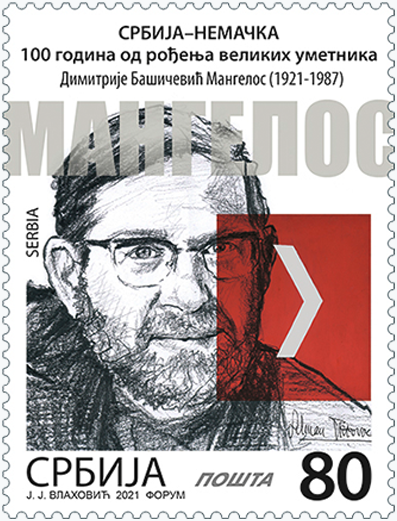
Bašičević on a 2021 stamp of Serbia

Mangelos (born Dimitrije Bašičević; 21 April 1921 – 18 December 1987) was a Yugoslavian artist, curator and art critic whose artistic production included handmade books, sculptures and paintings. His work and research contributed greatly to the development of abstract art in Croatia.

== Life and work ==
Dimitrije Bašičević, later to assume the pseudonym Mangelos in his artistic practice, was born into a farming family in Šid, Serbia on 21 April 1921. His father was the Serbian artist, Ilja Bašičević, known as a practitioner of Naive Art or Outsider Art. Bašičević studied art history and philosophy in Vienna (1942–1944) and Zagreb (1945–1949). In 1957 he completed a PhD on the topic of the work of artist Sava Šumanović. He worked for a time as a curator and assistant in the Yugoslavian academy of art and science. In 1952, he founded the Peasant Art Gallery, which he would develop into the Gallery of Primitive Art and act as curator for until 1964. This institution endures today as the Croatian Museum of Naive Art. In 1971, Bašičević became the chairman of the Center for Film Photography and Television, part of the Museum of Contemporary Art, Zagreb. He organized numerous exhibitions both within and outside Croatia which contributed to the growth of abstract art in eastern Europe. His writings on photography and art were frequently published. In 1982, he went into retirement and died on 18 December 1987.

As early as primary school Mangelos authored short prose pieces and poems, and began producing his first artistic works in 1941. He adopted the pseudonym Mangelos is 1959; it derives from the name of a small city near where he was born. He was a founding member of the avant-garde Gorgona Group and from 1975 became involved in the Group of Six Artists. Mangelos kept his artistic practice private, releasing works sometimes through the group-authorship of Gorgona or not at all. His first exhibition took place in 1968 in Belgrade, motivated as he was by the new generation of conceptual artists and critics. His theoretical and artistic practice engaged with the use of language, letters and texts. Originating from a desire to create Anti-Art, he used words and letter-forms as elements in paintings, in an attempt to negate the irrationality of the act of painting through the rational act of writing. Conversely, his painted text-works, which often combined languages and ripped letters or words from their life-giving context, negated the rationality of writing through the conversion of text to pure shape and form.

"negating a picture creating it from words,
negating a word by painting it
to make its meaning different from the one when it was written;
I was convinced
that the meaning of the word
or the painting
elapses…"

– Mangelos

Is his manifestos he discussed the possibility of progress within society during a simultaneous standstill in art. He argues that the ancient, while ingenious, mind cannot follow the rapid development of the 'Machine Civilization'. In his 1978 manifesto, 'Shid Theory' he develops the 'psycho-biological' hypothesis that as the human organism, and therefore also the personality, renews itself every seven years, his life can be subdivided into the existence of 9½ Mangelos'. In addition to spiritual tendencies, Mangelos' work is characterized by irony, intermediality, expressionistic nihilism and his unique experiment of „No-Art“.

He died in Zagreb, Croatia, aged 66. His works are held in the collection of the Tate.

== Solo exhibitions (selection) ==
- 1981: Zagreb, Galerija PM, "Mangelos no.1-9 – Retrospektiva"
- 1997: Berlin, Galerie Rainer Bürgermeister, "a b c"
- 1998: New York, A/D Gallery
- 1998: London, Anthony d‘Offay Gallery
- 2001: Berlin, The Drawing Room, "Les paysages des mots"
- 2003: Kassel, Kunsthalle Fridericianum, "nos. 1 – 91/2"
- 2011: London, Frieze Art Fair, Regent's Park
- 2014: New York, Galerie St. Etienne, "LIJA/MANGELOS: Father & Son, Inside & Out"
- 2014: Berlin, Aanant & Zoo, "Mangelos-documenta?"

== Group exhibitions (selection) ==
- 1959–1966: Zagreb, Kroatien; Performances als Mitglied der Gorgona Group
- 2008: Berlin, Haus der Kulturen der Welt, Transmediale 08, "Conspire"
- 2010: Paris, Centre Georges Pompidou, "Les Promesses du passé"
- 2011: New York, MoMA, "I Am Still Alive: Politics and Everyday Life in Contemporary Drawing"
- 2012: Wien, Belvedere, "Gold"
- 2013: Estonia, Kumu Art Museum, Art Museum of Estonia, "Critique and Crises. Art in Europe Since 1945"
