= List of Croatian women artists =

This is a list of women artists who were born in Croatia or whose artworks are closely associated with that country.

== B ==
- Jagoda Buić (1930–2022), visual artist
- Helena Bulaja (born 1971), multimedia artist, film director

== D ==
- Vera Dajht-Kralj (1928–2014), sculptor
- Jelena Dorotka (1876–1965), Cubist painter

== E ==
- Marta Ehrlich (1910–1980), painter

== F ==
- Eva Fischer (1920–2015), painter, engraver
- Vera Fischer (1925–2009), sculptor
- Ingeborg Fülepp (born 1952), artist, educator, film editor

== I ==
- Nina Ivančić (born 1953), contemporary painter, educator
- Sanja Iveković (born 1949), photographer, sculptor, installation artist

== K ==
- Mira Klobučar (1888–1956), painter
- Živa Kraus (born 1945), painter
- Anka Krizmanić (1896–1987), painter, printmaker
- Andreja Kulunčić (born 1968), contemporary artist
- Heddy Kun (born 1936), Croatian-born Israeli painter

== M ==
- Tina Morpurgo (1907–1944), painter
- Romana Milutin Fabris (born 1941), painter

== N ==
- Vera Nikolić Podrinska (1886–1972), painter

== R ==
- Slava Raškaj (1877–1906), prominent watercolourist
- Nasta Rojc (1883–1964), painter

== S ==
- Stella Skopal (1904–1992), sculptor
- Ana Sladetić (born 1985), artist

== T ==
- Ivana Tomljenović-Meller (1906–1988), graphic designer

== U ==
- Marija Ujević-Galetović (1933–2023), sculptor

== V ==
- Miranda Vidak (active since c. 2000), Croatian-American fashion designer
- Ana Vidjen (1931–2025), sculptor
