= Vera Stein Ehrlich =

- Born: Vera Ehrlich; 4 October 1897; Zagreb, Kingdom of Croatia-Slavonia, Austria-Hungary
- Died: 31 August 1980 (aged 82); Zagreb, SR Croatia, Yugoslavia
- Occupation: Anthropologist
- Spouse: Beno Stein
- Relatives: Herman Ehrlich (grandfather), Aleksandar Savić (nephew), Hugo Ehrlich (uncle), Mira Klobučar (aunt)

Vera Stein Ehrlich (Zagreb, 4 October 1897 - Zagreb, 31 August 1980) was a Yugoslav social anthropologist of Croatian descent who gave a significant scientific contribution to the development of anthropology and sociology in Yugoslavia and, later, Croatia.

== Early life and career ==
Vera Stein Ehrlich was born on 4 October 1897 in Zagreb to Adolf and Ida Ehrlich. She grew up in Zagreb with her younger sister Ina Jun-Broda (1899-1983) who later become notable writer and translator. She studied pedagogy and psychology in Berlin and Vienna. At the age of 19, she began publishing works on psychological and pedagogic problems. In 1933, 1934, and 1936, she published books on the issues of education of children and youth. As part of the fifteen studies conducted in those years, she was writing about the methods and meaning of drawing and books for children. Her paper on the impact of illness on the character of the child was a result of cooperation with her husband Dr. Ben Stein. At that time, Ehrlich was particularly concerned with individual psychology, probably influenced by the achievements of Austrian psychologist Alfred Adler to whom she wrote an obituary in the "Jew", Gazette of the Jewish Community of Zagreb. In that same period, she became interested in the problem of the position of women in the Yugoslav society. She was among the first to start discussing these issues scientifically in order to encourage the change of policy, legal norms and the attitude of society towards the woman and to help so they would stop being treated as second-class citizens. She also studied the activities of women in the economy. With her writing, she encouraged woman activism in society and struggle for the right to vote. Already in 1935, she emphasized the successes of the feminist movement in her works. She was interested in the process of liberating women from the tutoring of a man who was still legally superior. Disempowerment and the lack of protection of women in, at the then conservative patriarchal society, motivated her to conduct research and start teaching. She studied the life of rural families and intergenerational relationships. Psychological analysis of life situations has introduced her to the field of social anthropology. At the time, she had already prepared a survey on issues that enabled her to gain insight into the social situation in rural areas which also provided her with an analysis of the status of women and the relationship between the family members. The survey was forwarded to many associations in the Kingdom of Yugoslavia. By the beginning of World War II, she received responses from 300 villages.

== Later work ==
By the beginning of the Second World War, Ehrlich belonged to a group of prominent advanced Yugoslav intellectuals. After the Nazi invasion of Yugoslavia in 1941, she fled to Split where she joined the Yugoslav Partisans. During the Holocaust, the Ustaše killed Ehrlich's husband Ben Stein and nephew Aleksandar Savić. After the war, she gained Ph.D. in cultural anthropology at University of California, where she also lectured on the anthropology of Croats and South Slavs from 1952 to 1960. In the United States, she was a close associate of American anthropologist Alfred L. Kroeber. She considered collaboration with him and Robert Lowie an important incentive which helped her grow into a good social anthropologist. She considered their influence to be crucial for her acceptance of the anthropological discoveries she approached earlier in her pre-war studies. After her return to SFR Yugoslavia, she lectured social anthropology at the Faculty of Humanities and Social Sciences and Faculty of Political Science of the University of Zagreb. During that time, she studied the position of women in traditional societies and transformation of a rural family. In her post-war work, Ehrlich developed the evolutionary phases of the relationship and structure of rural families, analyzing the examples of collectivism as the indicative phase of the pre-individualist processes in the South Slavic social milieu. According to individual and social behavior, she defined a regional traditional cultural complex. She also noticed changes in the "tribal" society of mountain regions of SFR Yugoslavia. She analyzed the values and their valorization by the social group, that is, indications of intercultural impacts. Intergenerational relationships, family transformations, changes in the perceptions and behaviors of a group, individual and phenomenon of authority were constantly at the core of her interests. Her two works, 1964 "Family in Transformation" and 1968 "In Society with Man", are still a special feature in ethnological and sociological literature. They were used as textbooks at the Zagreb Faculty of Humanities and Social Sciences, as well as in faculties in Sarajevo, the Netherlands, the US and England, where she was a guest professor at the departments of sociology on several occasions. In addition to studying the relationship between the sexes in patriarchal rural environments, Ehrlich also studied domestic partnerships. Her analyzes were in the context of events in the families of the communities, and led to conclusions on the regional "cultural climate". Ehrlich knew well the interpersonal and family relations of a great part of Southeast Europe, as well as the characteristics of living of other indigenous cultures, as she used to say "from Arctic to Antarctica". She used her wide knowledge in comparing problems and processes of changing. As a passionate researcher, she was recording data whenever she got a chance.

She spent last 20 years of her life in SFR Yugoslavia and has devoted mostly to studying the processes in the rural cultural milieu of Croatia and the wider neighboring mountainous areas. As she aged, she was rarely present at scientific conferences with last one she attended being the one held in Bloomington in 1973. Nevertheless, she was still active in professional societies, primarily in the Commission for the Advancement of Family Development and Solving Social Problems of Women in SR Croatia. Many of her colleagues from various countries, such as sociologist Rudi Supek and ethnographer Marijana Gušić, visited her often in her apartment in Visoka street 10. She enjoyed discussing the problems of the profession and transferring her knowledge to the young. In 1979, she was awarded Kata Pejnović award for science.

Vera Stein Ehrlich died on 31 August 1980 in Zagreb. She was buried in the Jewish part of Mirogoj cemetery in a family tomb.

== Publications ==
- Kolektivni rad u suvremenoj školi [Collective Work in Contemporary School], Minerva, 1933
- Metoda Montessori u školi [Montessori Method at School], Minerva, 1934
- Individualna psihologija u školskoj praksi [Individual Psychology in School Practice], Minerva, 1934
- Današnje dijete: problemi savremenog odgoja [Today's Child: Problems of Contemporary Education], Izdanje Atlas nakladnog zavoda, 1936
- Obitelj u transformaciji: studija u tri stotine jugoslavenskih sela [Family in Transformation: Study in Three Hundred Yugoslav Villages], Naprijed, 1964
- U društvu s čovjekom: tragom njegovih kulturnih i socijalnih tekovina [In Society with Man: The Trace of Its Cultural and Social Effects], Naprijed, 1968
- Family in Transition: A Study of 300 Yugoslav Villages, Princeton University Press, 1966

== Literature ==
- Romano, Jaša (1980). Jevreji Jugoslavije 1941-1945: žrtve genocida i učesnici narodnooslobodilačkog rata, Beograd: Jevrejski Istorijski Muzej, Saveza jevrejskih opština Jugoslavije.
