= Bela Čikoš Sesija =

Croatian painter

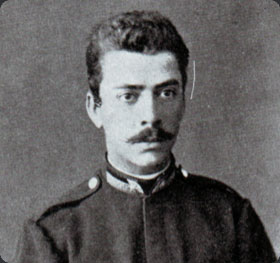
- Born: Adalbert Csikos Sessia; 27 January 1864; Osijek, Kingdom of Croatia-Slavonia, Austrian Empire
- Died: 11 February 1931 (aged 67); Zagreb, Kingdom of Yugoslavia
- Known for: Painting
- Notable work: Dante series

Bela Čikoš Sesija (born Adalbert Csikos Sessia; 27 January 1864 in Osijek – 11 February 1931 in Zagreb) was a Croatian Symbolist painter, art teacher and one of the founders of the Academy of Fine Arts in Zagreb.

== Biography ==
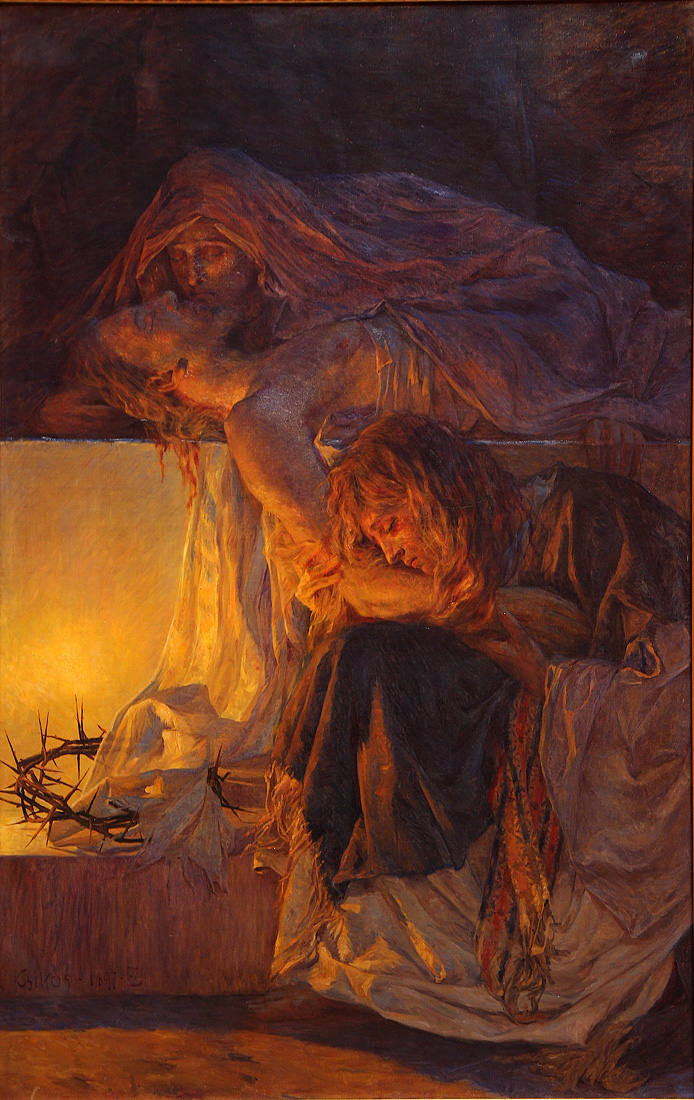
The Mourning of Christ

Čikoš Sesija's father was a Captain in the border patrol of the Austro-Hungarian Empire. One of the Čikoš' ancestors was a hero at the Battle of the Sesia in 1524 and, as a result, was knighted with the name "Sesija".

Due to his father's reassignments, the family moved frequently and his education was sporadic until he entered the Cadet School at Karlovac in 1874. After graduation, in 1882, Čikoš Sesija was assigned to the 78th Osijek infantry regiment under Baron Josip Šokčević. He moved up in the ranks quickly, becoming a full Lieutenant in 1886, but resigned the following year because he refused to help support Károly Khuen-Héderváry's policy of Magyarization.

Despite having shown no particular aptitude for art, Čikoš Sesija enrolled at the Academy of Fine Arts Vienna, where he studied with Julius Victor Berger. While there he received two gold medals, in 1889 and 1891, for scenes depicting ancient history. In 1891, he also enrolled in a special course in Orientalist painting taught by Leopold Müller.

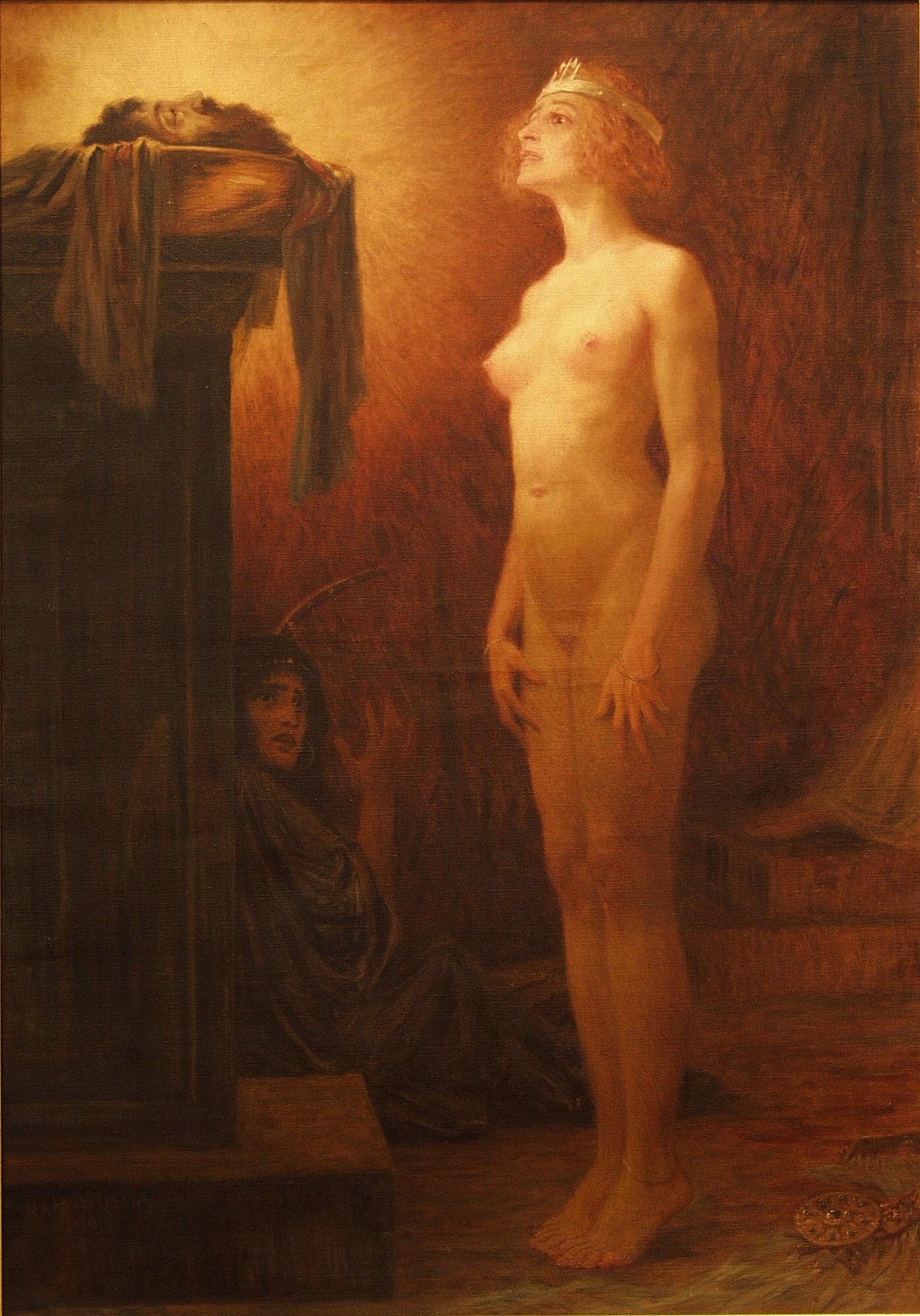
Salome

After Müller's death in 1892, he returned to Zagreb and participated in decorating the "Pompeian Room" at the local offices of the "Department of Education and Religious Affairs" (now occupied by the "Institute for Croatian History"). His work there was supervised by the head of the department, Izidor Kršnjavi, who would become his patron and mentor. The first thing Kršnjavi did was send him on a study trip to Venice with Robert Frangeš-Mihanović and Ferdo Kovačević. This was followed by studies at the Academy of Fine Arts, Munich with Wilhelm Lindenschmit.

Čikoš Sesija then married his cousin Justine, then together embarked on another study trip to Italy. This was followed by more studies in Munich, with Carl von Marr, after which he settled in Zagreb, joining the circle of painters who gathered around Vlaho Bukovac. His mentor, Kršnjavi, was not happy about that, believing that Bukovac was a bad influence. This led to a conflict that caused him to leave Zagreb, in 1895, taking a job as a drawing teacher in Ogulin. A year later, he was back in Zagreb, with his own studio and reconciled with Kršnjavi.

In 1902, he left Zagreb again; this time largely for economic reasons, and traveled to America with fellow painter Robert Auer. After a mostly unsuccessful year, he came back and opened a private art school, together with Menci Klement Crnčić. Four years later he, Crnčić, Auer, Frangeš-Mihanović, Rudolf Valdec, Oton Iveković and Branko Šenoa would join together to help create the "Royal College for Arts and Crafts" (now the Academy of Fine Arts at the University of Zagreb).

In his later years Čikoš Sesija became increasingly withdrawn. He died suddenly, while at his easel, working on a canvas called "The Death of Innocence".

== Works ==
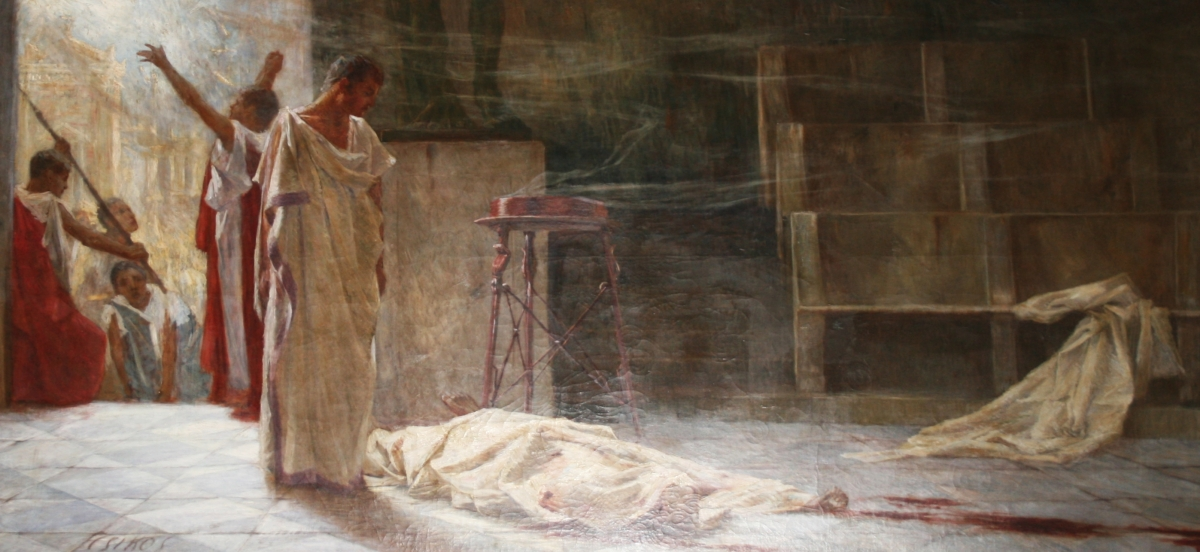
Mark Antony
and Caesar's Corpse

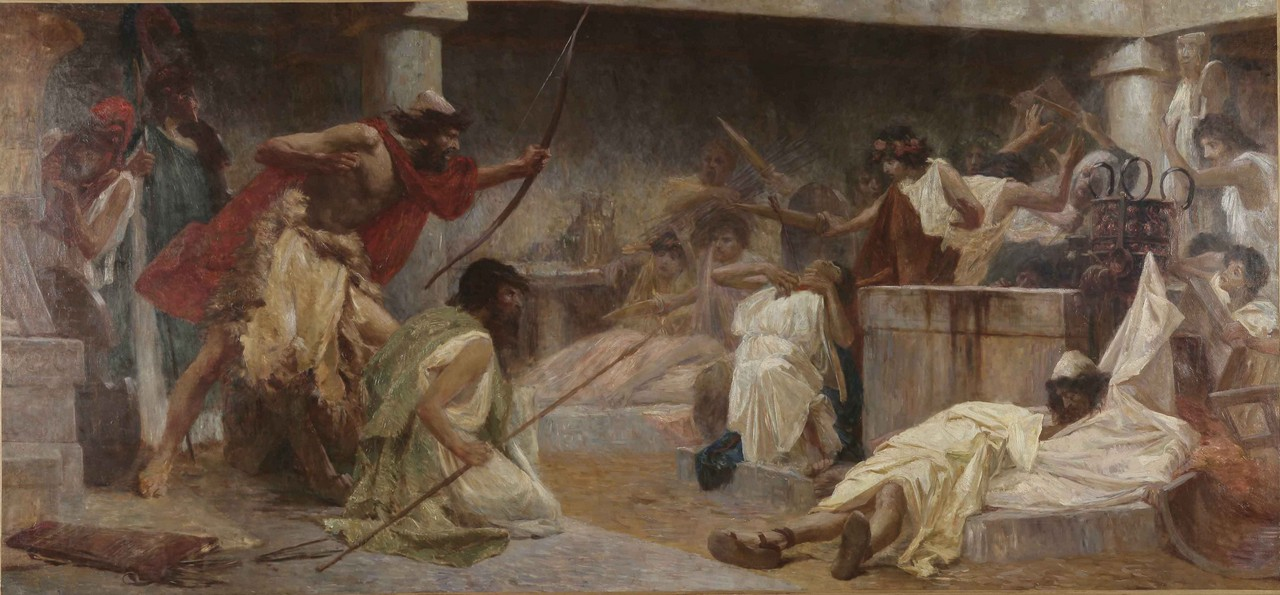
Odysseus Kills the Suitors

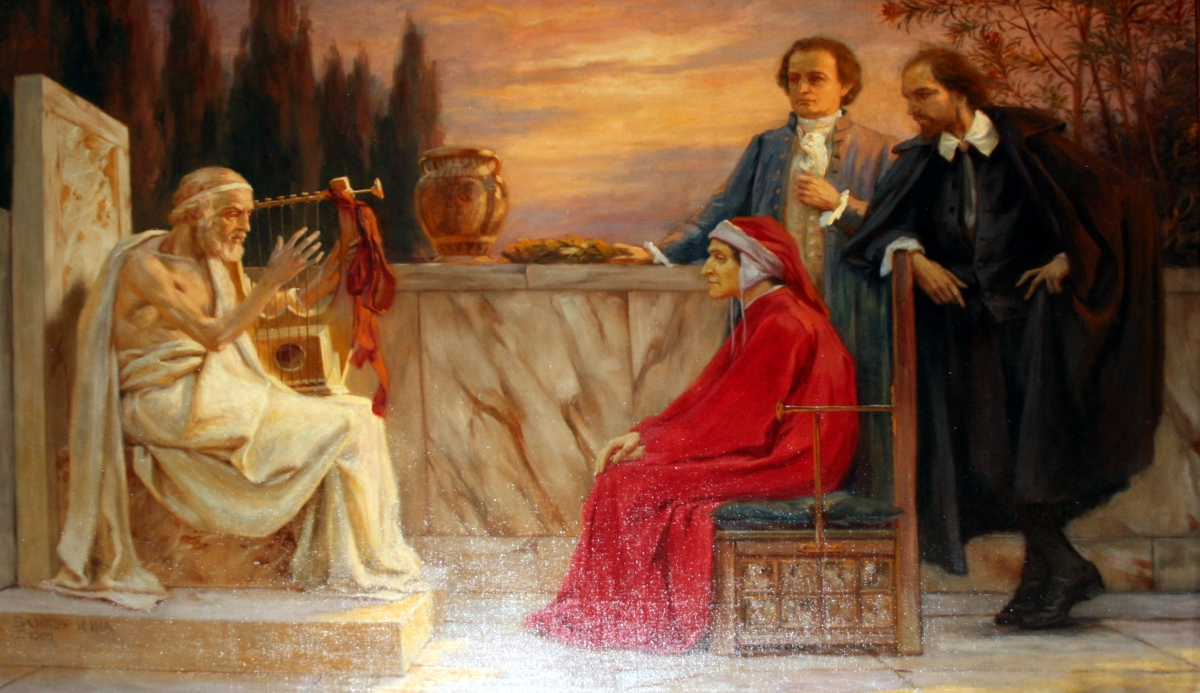
Homer teaches Dante, Shakespeare and Goethe to sing

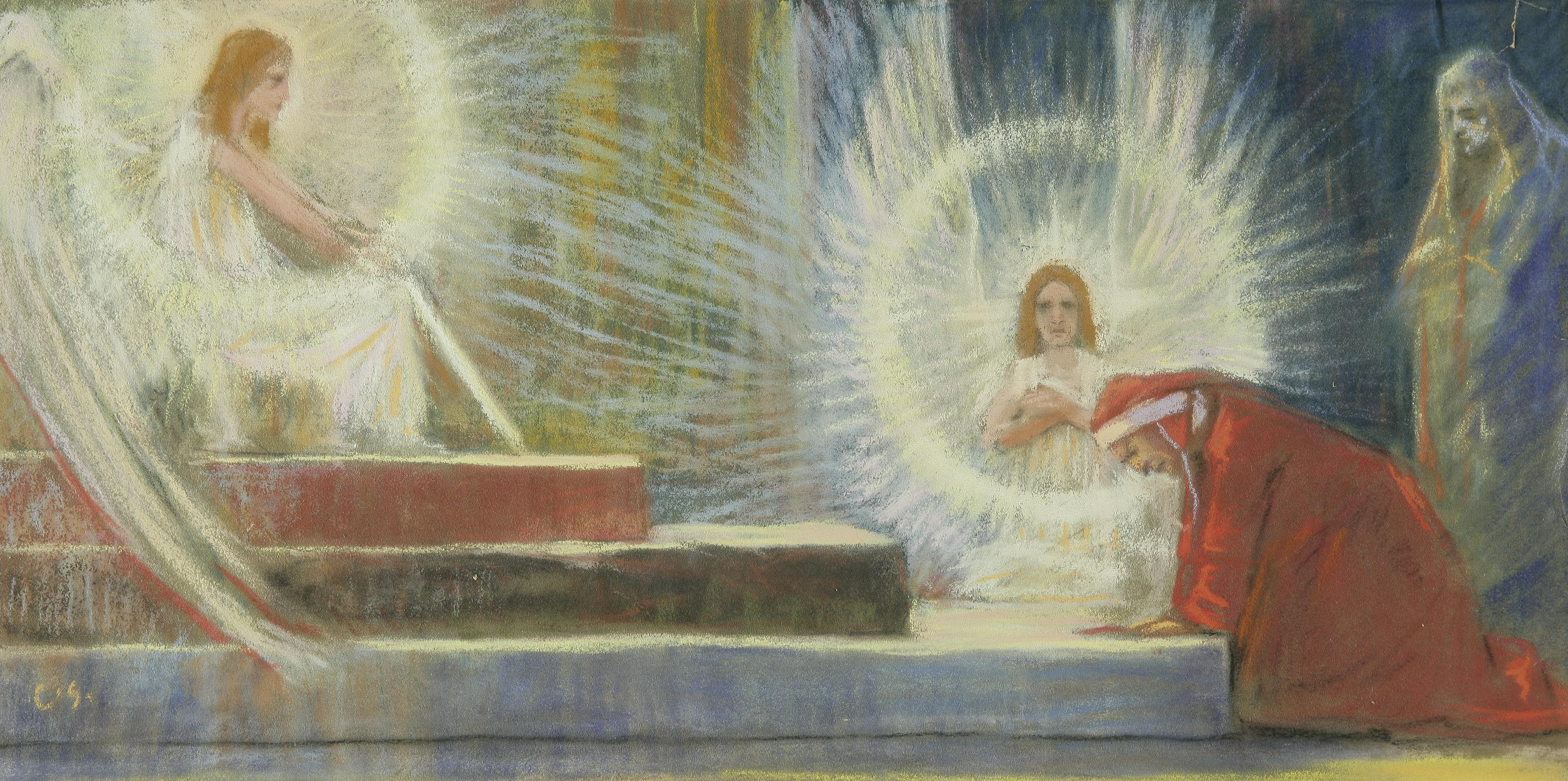
From Dante's Inferno

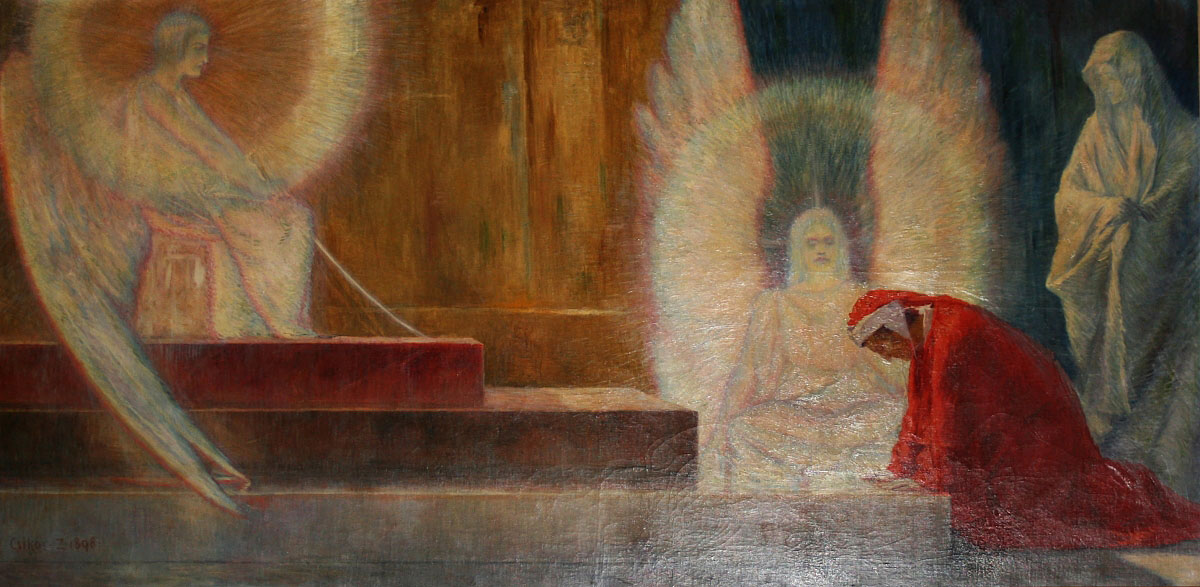
Dante Before the Gates of Purgatory

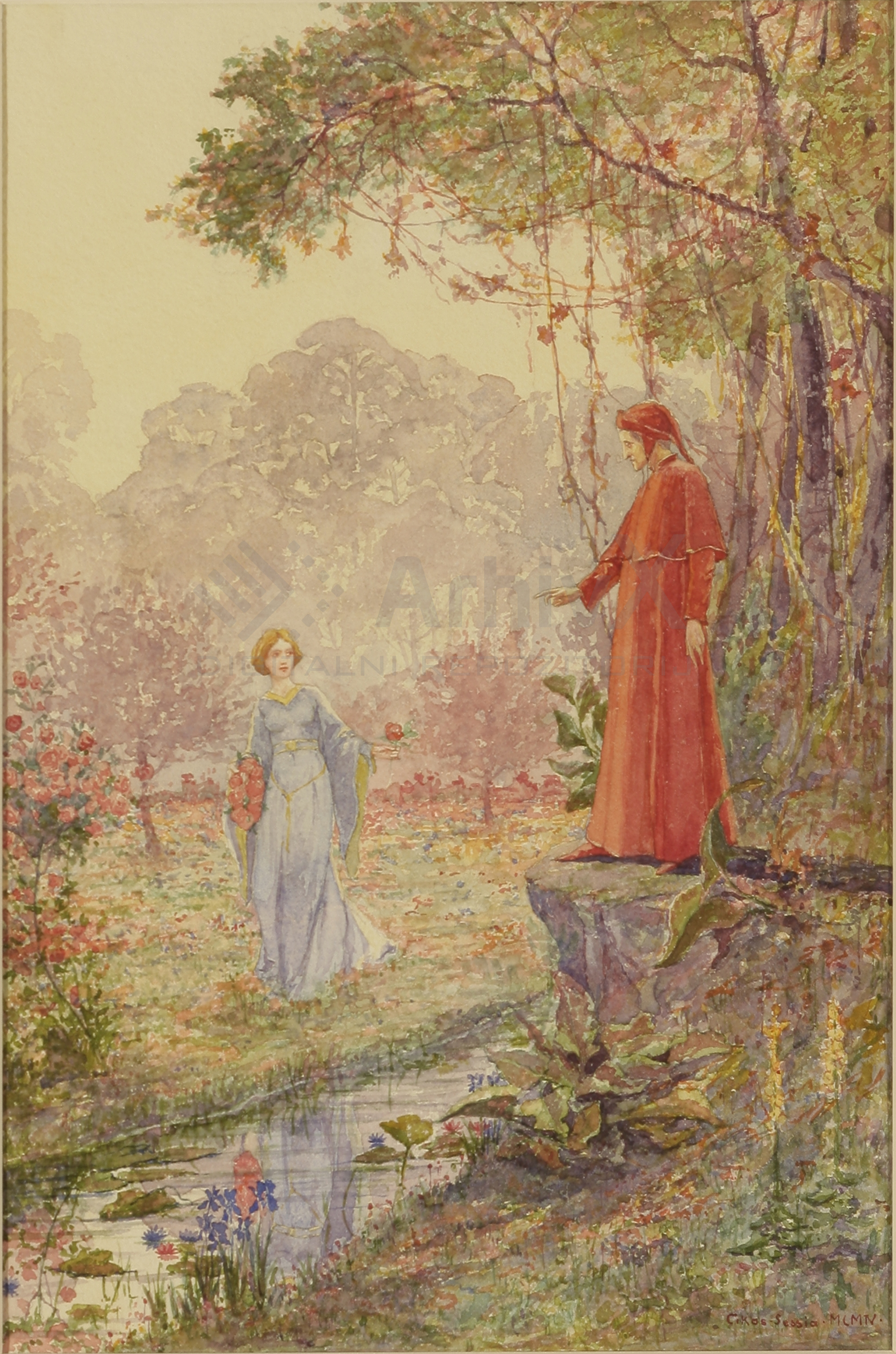
Dante and Beatrice

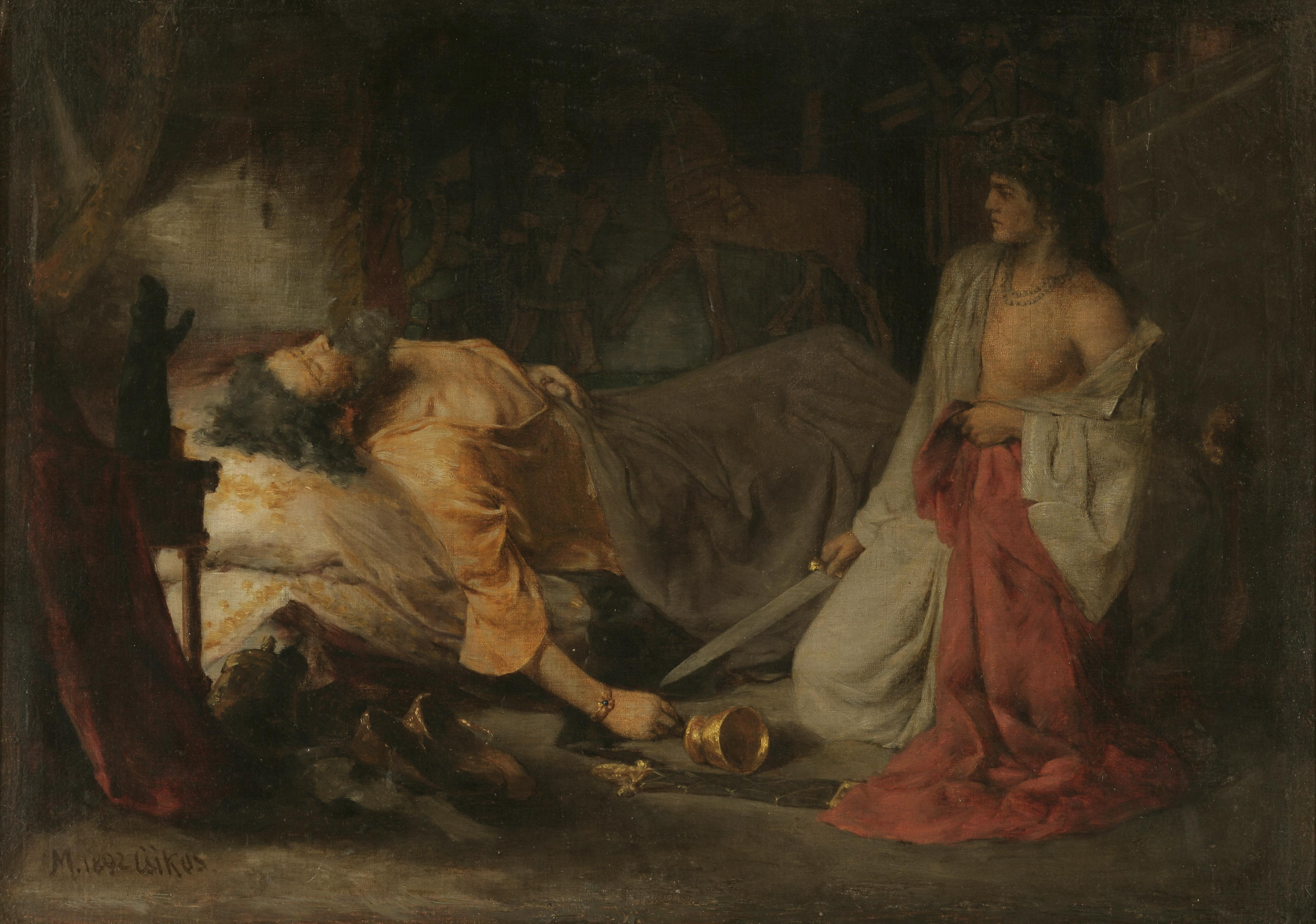
Judith and Holofernes

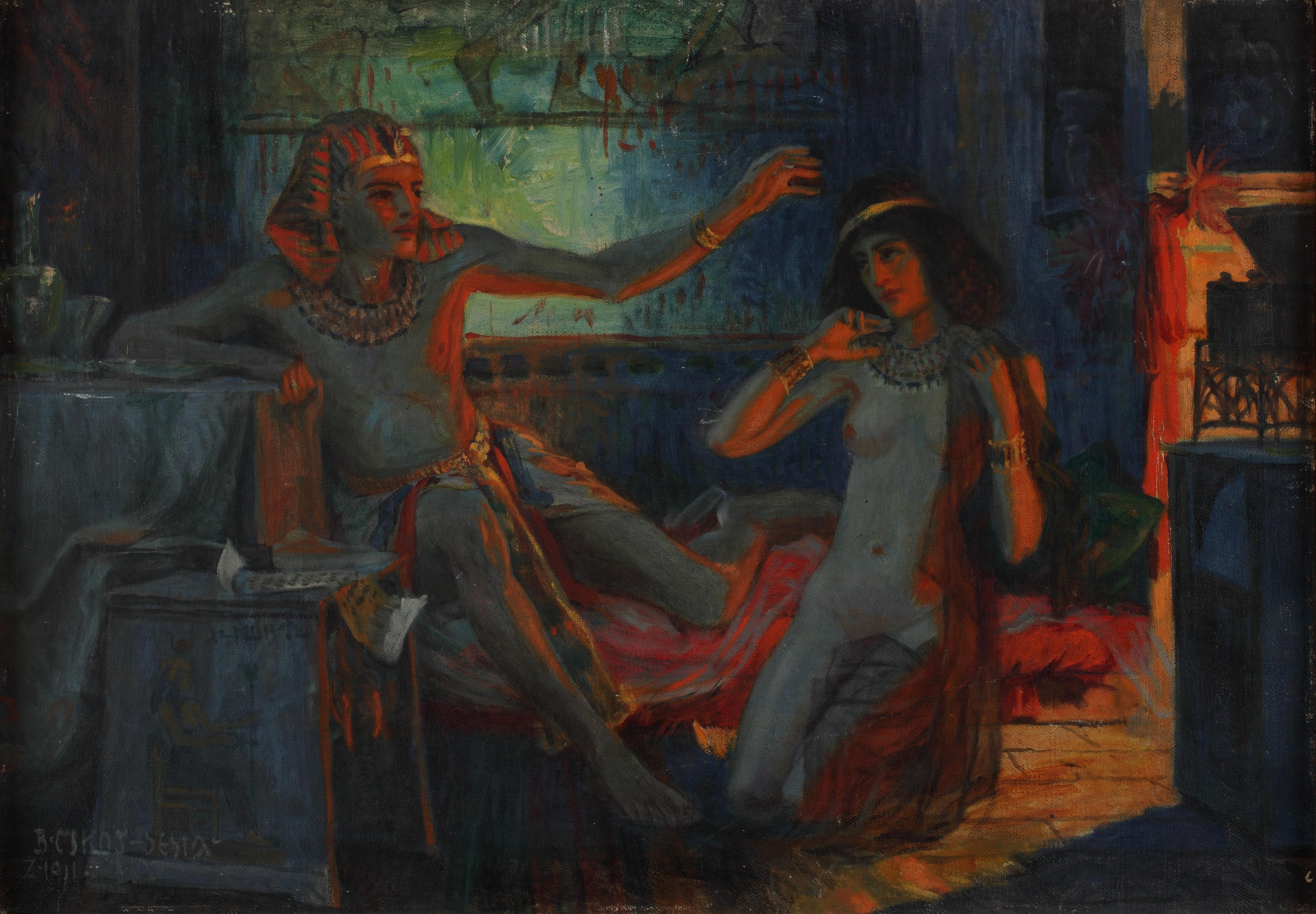
Ta-bu-bu

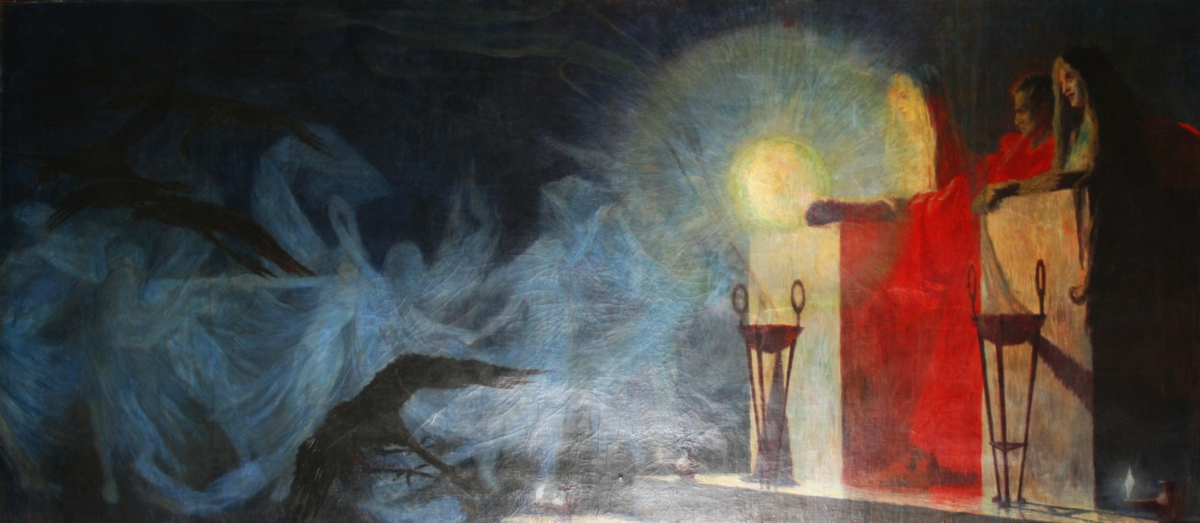
Walpurgis Nacht

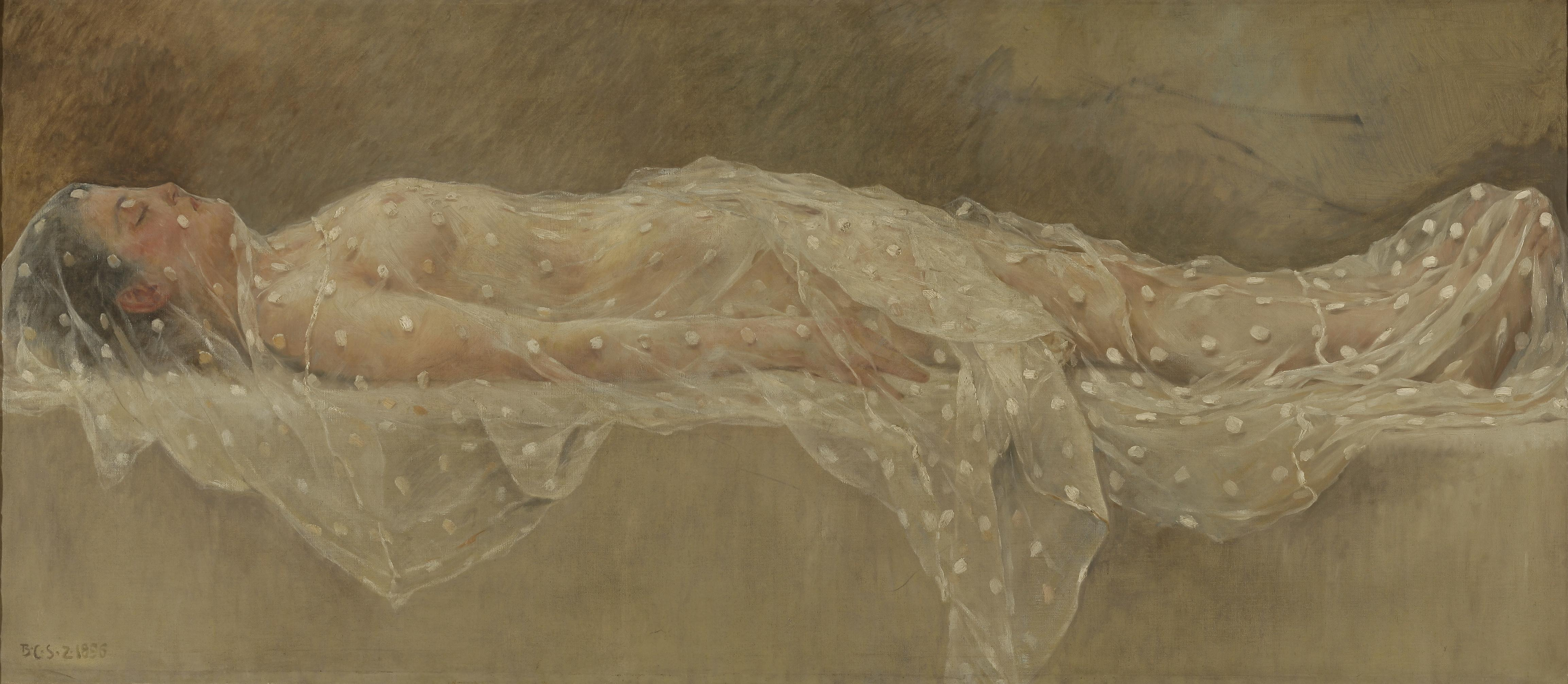
Study of a dead guard

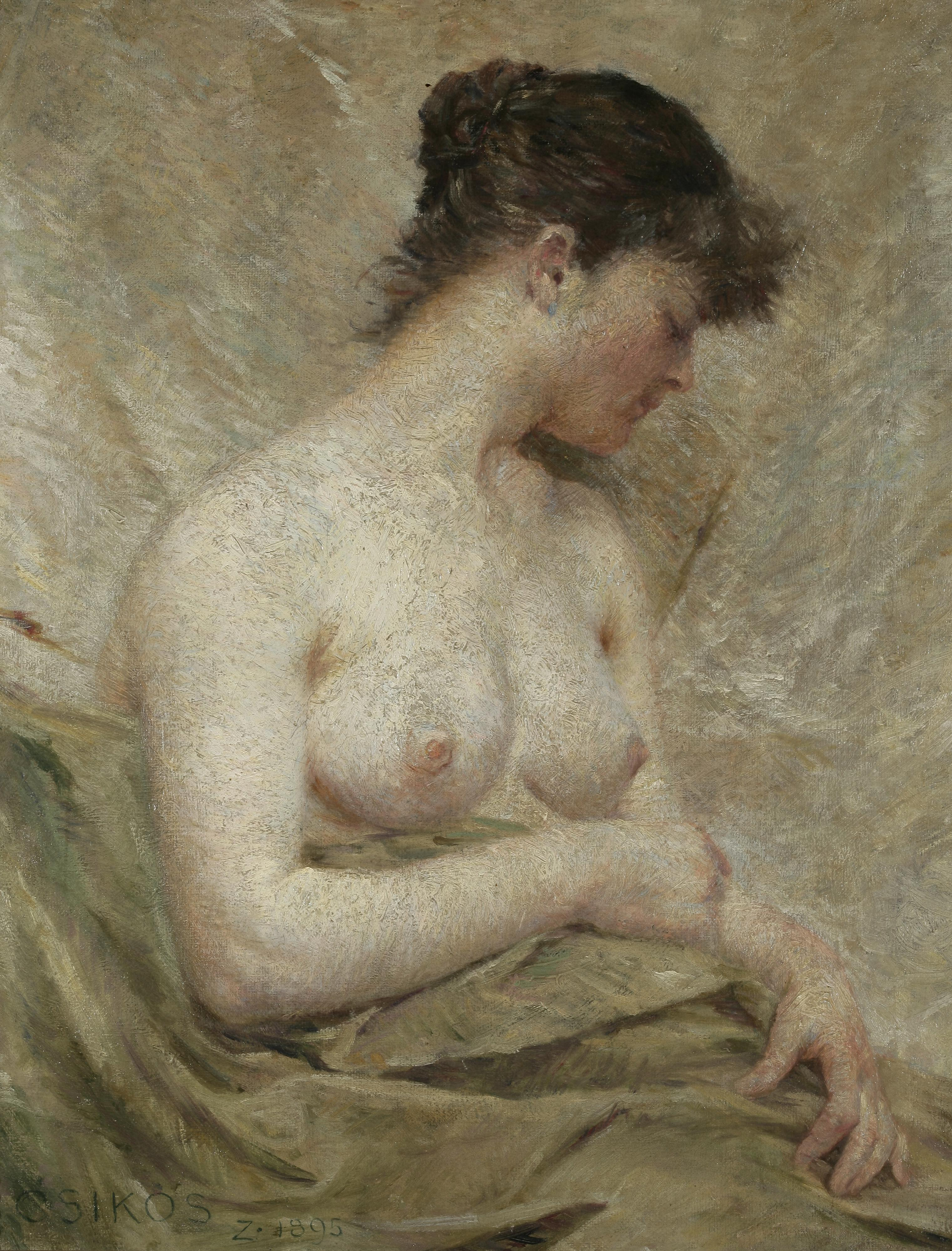
Half-Nude Female

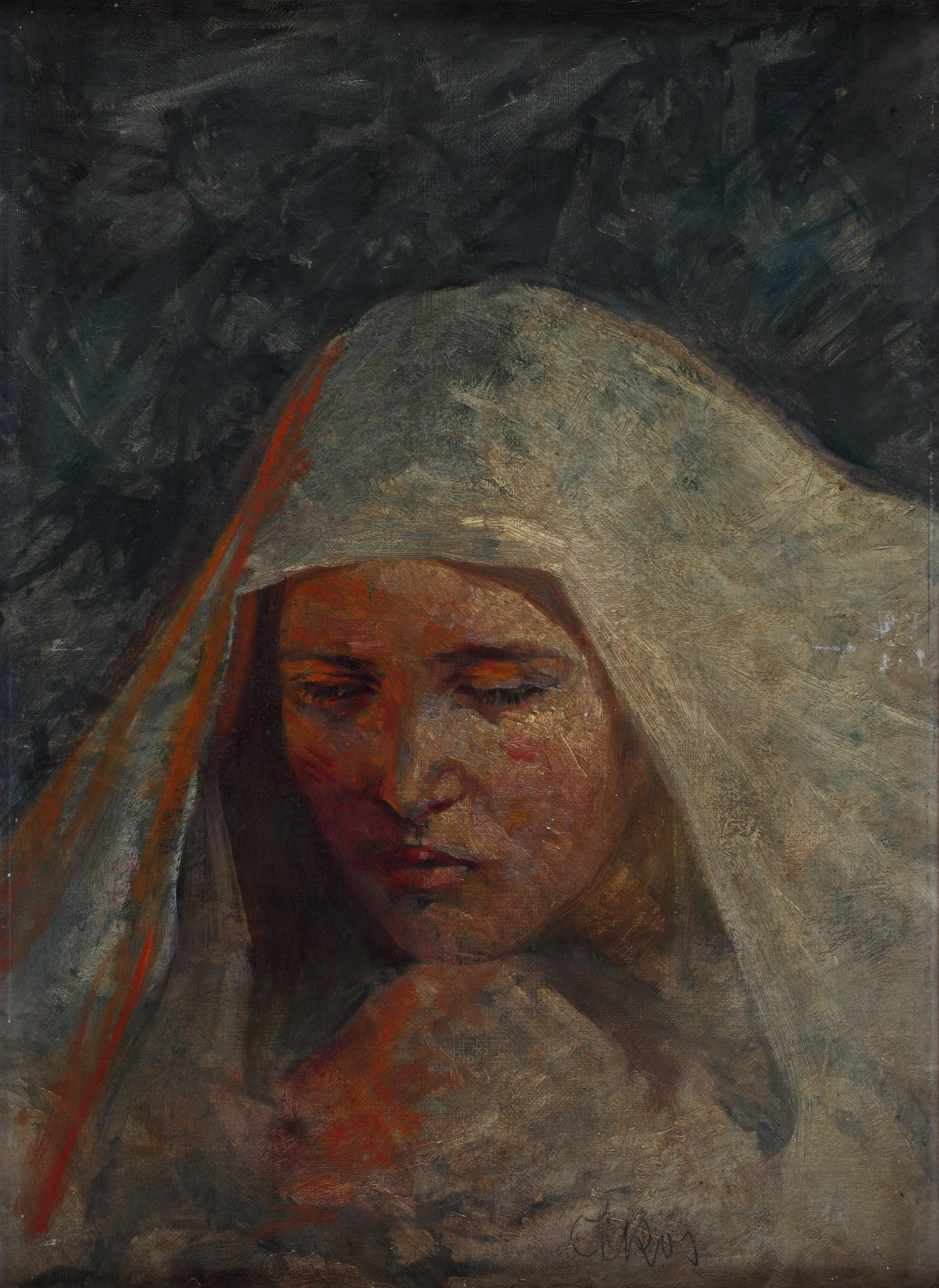
Study of a Woman's head

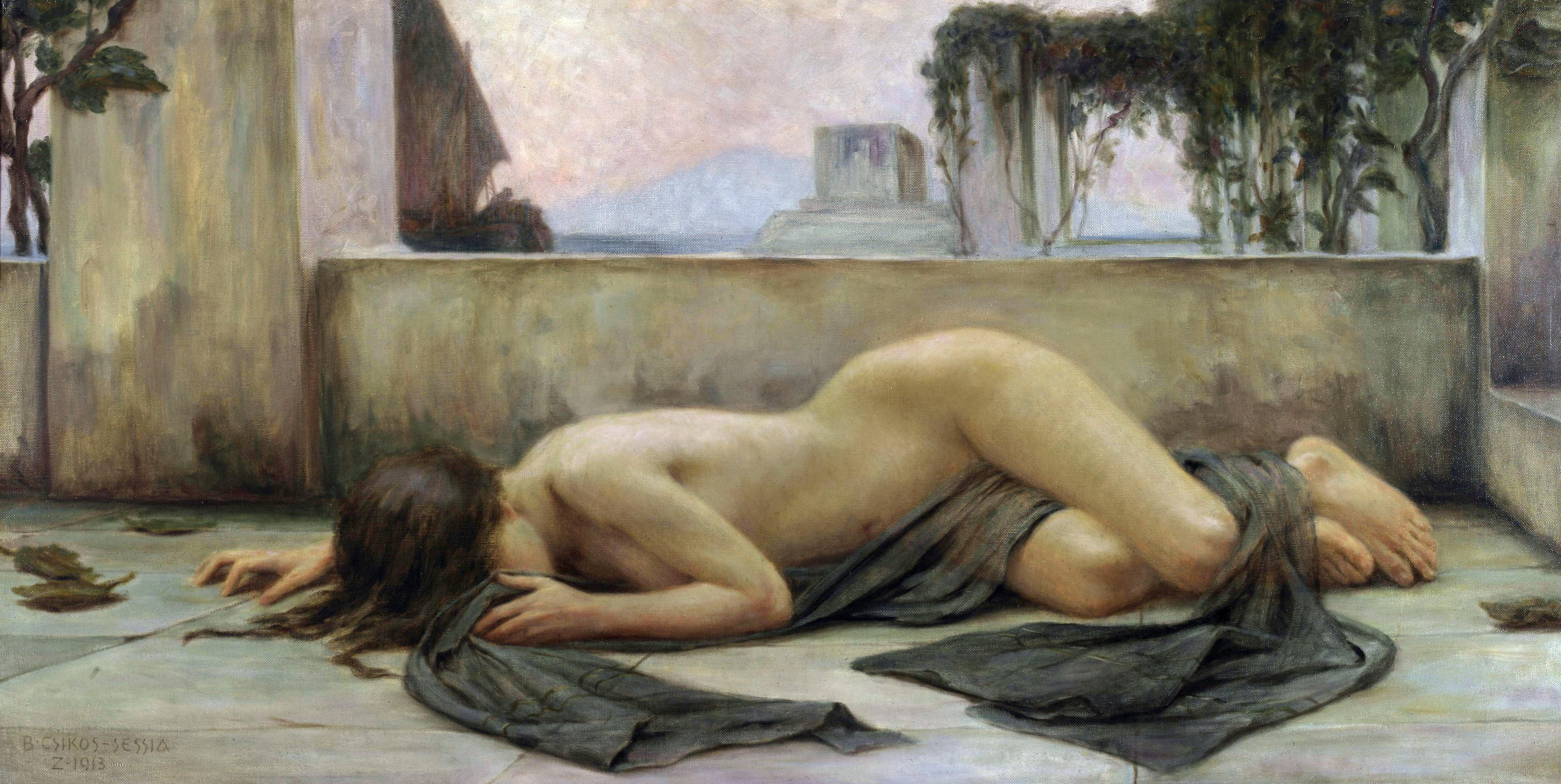
Female Nude

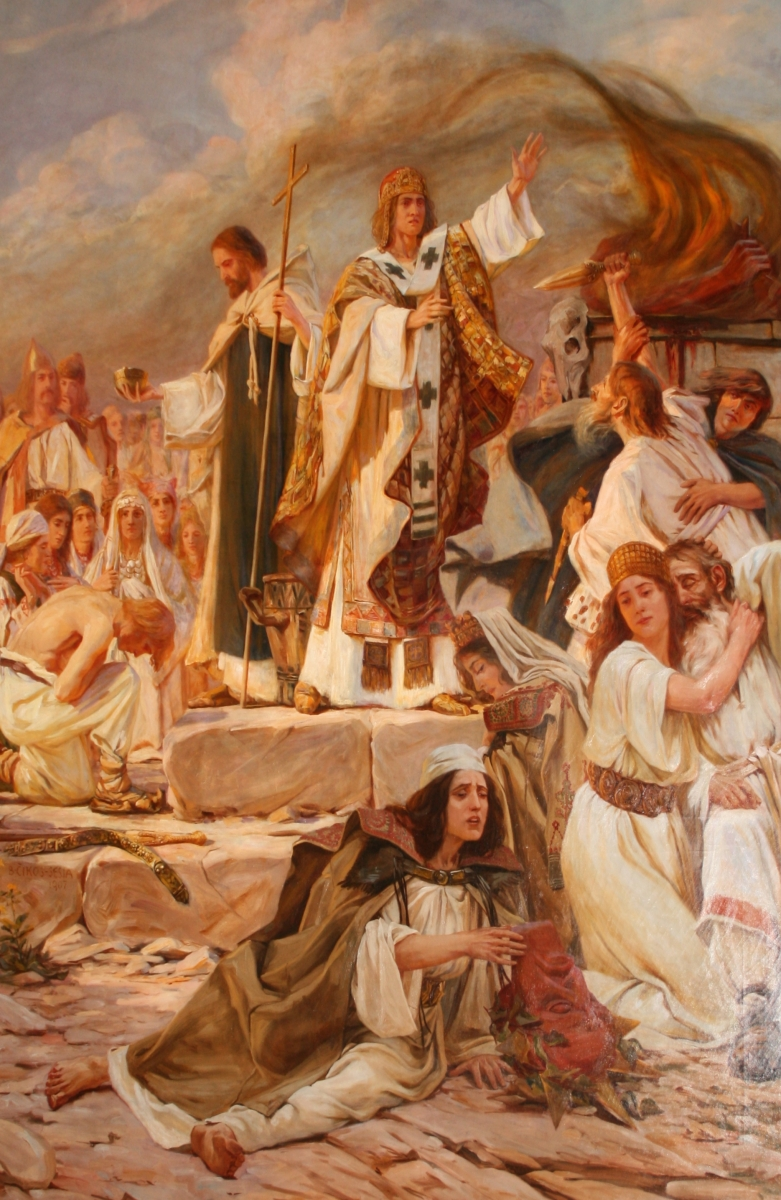
Christening of the Croats

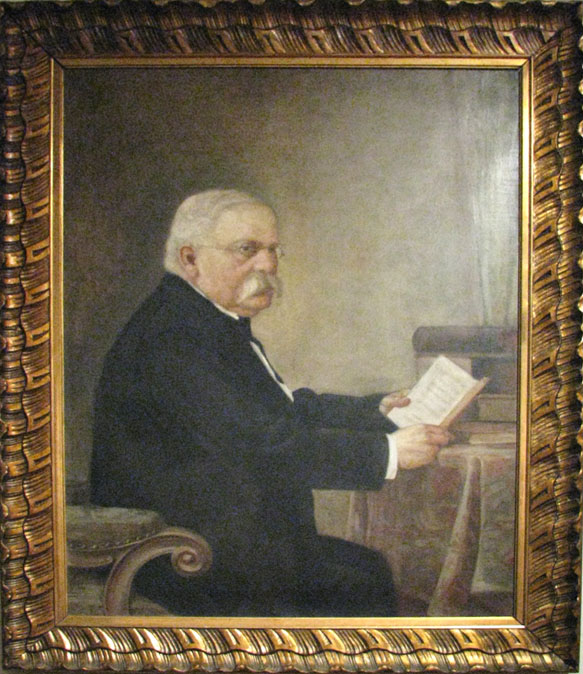
Portrait of Janko Kamauf

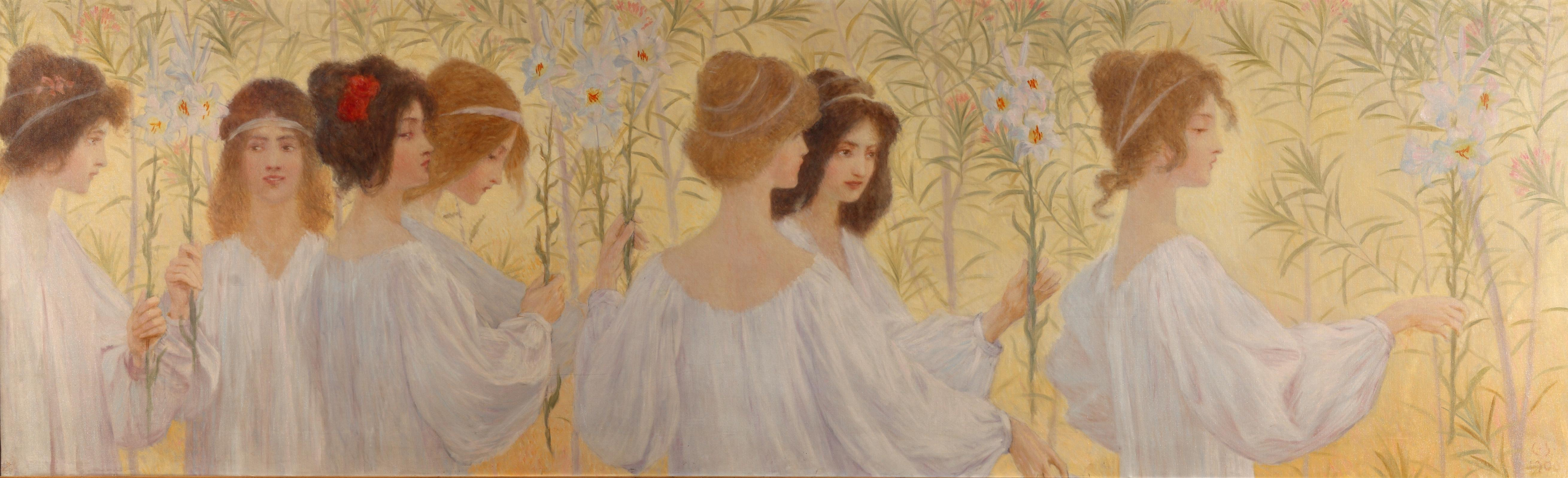
Triumph of Innocence
