= Menci Clement Crnčić =

Croatian painter, printmaker, teacher and museum director

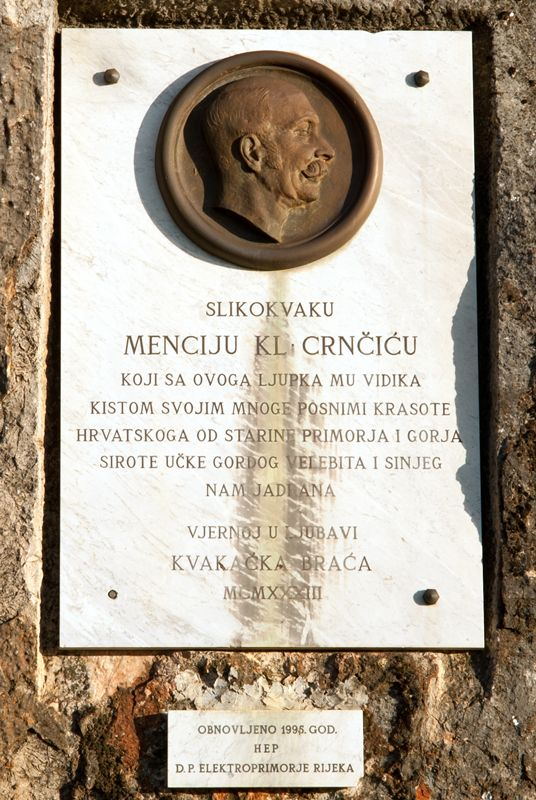
- Born: 3 April 1865; Bruck an der Mur, Austrian Empire
- Died: 9 November 1930 (aged 65); Zagreb, Croatia
- Education: Vienna Academy of Fine Arts, Academy of Fine Arts, Munich
- Known for: Oil painting, Graphic arts
- Movement: Modern Art

Menci Clement Crnčić (Bruck an der Mur, Austria, 3 April 1865 – Zagreb, 9 November 1930) was a Croatian painter, printmaker, teacher and museum director. He studied painting and drawing in Vienna and Munich, and trained in graphic arts in Vienna, studying etching and engraving. He was the first artist in the Croatian graphic tradition to abandon a strictly linear style and use tonal variation to create contrasting areas of light and shade.

Crnčić established himself as a marine artist with a series of paintings of the Istrian peninsula and the Adriatic coast. He was one of the founders of the first private painting school in Zagreb, which grew to become part of the Academy of Fine Arts, Zagreb. He taught there until the end of his life. He became a member of the Yugoslav Academy of Sciences and Arts in 1919, and was the Director of The Strossmayer Gallery of Old Masters from 1920 to 1928.

Menci Clement Crnčić is among the founders of modern Croatian painting, contributing greatly to its development. He promoted landscape painting, mainly seascapes, using light, colour, and soft strokes in an impressionist style. He was the founder of modern Croatian graphic art, and played an important role in teaching several generations of Croatian painters.

== Biography ==
Menci Clement Crnčić was born on 3 April 1865 in Bruck an der Mur in the Duchy of Styria, Austria-Hungary (now Bruck an der Mur, Styria, Austria). His father, a border official, intended his son for the military, so after elementary school in Vienna, Menci attended a military grammar school. At seventeen he decided to leave military school and study painting. Following two years at the Vienna Academy of Fine Arts, from 1882 to 1884, he stayed in Coburg for a year (1886–1887) painting sets for the theatre. Not having sufficient funds to continue his studies, he lived in Nova Gradiška with his sister Marie, painting landscapes and portraits. Between 1889 and 1892 he continued his art education at the Academy of Fine Arts, Munich under Professor Nicolaus Gysis.

After graduating, Crnčić taught painting in the Arts and Crafts School in Zagreb, but in 1894 Izidor Kršnjavi, the Director of the Institute for Education and Theology recognized Crnčić's talent for drawing. He arranged a scholarship for Crnčić to study etching and engraving in Vienna under the tuition of the graphic artist William Unger. For part of that time, due to Unger's illness, Crnčić stayed with the professor and his family in Lovran on the Croatian coast. While there, he painted scenes of the Istrian peninsula and along the Adriatic coast. During his graphical studies (1894–1897), Crnčić was awarded the 1896 Fuger gold medal for best work, and a special prize from the academy in 1897. At this time Crnčić exhibited in Zagreb and other European cities (Budapest, St. Petersburg, and Paris) with other artists of the Croatian Art Society (Društvo hrvatskih umjetnika). He also exhibited regularly at the international exhibition in Opatija, selling many of his paintings.

In 1900, Crnčić moved to Zagreb. At his first solo exhibition in 1900–1901 in the Art Pavilion, he showed 39 oil paintings and prints, including several seascapes which remained a favourite theme throughout his life. His work raised interest in the art circles of Zagreb owing to his rich, bright colours and the high quality of his graphics.

Over the next few years, Crnčić spent time travelling around Croatia, drawing and painting from nature, and exhibiting his work in Zagreb, Opatija and Vienna. In the summer of 1902, he visited the Plitvice Lakes, and at October's exhibition in Opatija, his painting "Blossoming Barberry" was particularly well received. In December of that year, he held a solo exhibit in the E. Artina Salon in Vienna. Following that show, Crnčić received a grant from the Emperor of 2,000 kruna to create a series of etchings of the Adriatic coast in Primorje and Dalmatia. In the spring 1903 he spent time in Opatija, creating landscapes of Primorje and the Bay of Kvarner characterized by thick impasto brush strokes. Some landscapes of the island of Lošinj were painted in using a pointillist technique. In the summer he was painting the mountainous region of Gorski Kotar.

By 1905, Crnčić was travelling to places around Europe in the company of other artists, studying and painting. In 1905 he visited Italy, Switzerland, France, Belgium, Germany and Austria. In 1907 he travelled down Italy to Naples, and in 1908 toured Bosnia and Herzegovina.

In October 1906, together with fellow artist Bela Čikoš-Sesija, Crnčić opened the first private painting school in Zagreb, which in 1907 became an art college, and finally grew into the Academy of Fine Arts, Zagreb where he was a professor until his death.

At the beginning of 1910, Crnčić married the painter Una Virant. Their son Menci Clement was born in 1911, followed in 1915 by their daughter Branka. Between 1910 and 1915, he constructed a villa in Novi Vinodolski where he painted a number of famous works. He frequently invited his students and friends to visit him in the villa.

He held a solo exhibition at the Ulrich Salon in Zagreb in 1911. There he showed, among other paintings, a series of works representing scenes of the Velebit mountains. These introduced a change in his style of painting - instead of dense impasto he began to use thin layers of colour with fine brush movements.

Crnčić was among the first members of the Yugoslav Academy of Sciences and Arts in 1919 and was the Director of The Strossmayer Gallery of Old Masters from 1920 to 1928.

Crnčić died on 9 November 1930, aged 65. His death came suddenly after he returned one sunny autumn Sunday from a trip to the Sava river bank near Podsused. His last words were: "How beautiful the nature is, tomorrow I must come again to paint it."

== Legacy ==
Crnčić's early work shows the realism and neutral colours that are characteristic of the Munich circle. These include the 1890 "Girl" (Djevojčica), and the 1891 "Old Man Shelling Corn" (Starac runi kukuruz) which has a strong sense of realism, painted in neutral shades with a distinctive white shirt, and yellow corn. Both paintings are in the Modern Gallery, Zagreb.

While studying in Vienna, he occasionally exhibited in Zagreb, Opatija and abroad (Budapest, St. Petersburg, Paris). Crnčić was part of the Croatian Society of Artists in Zagreb (Društvo hrvatskih umjetnika), which was to grow into the Croatian modern art movement.

By his first solo exhibition in 1900–1901 in the Art Pavilion in Zagreb, his painting style had changed, with brighter colours appearing, and themes of landscapes and seascapes which were to remain a favourite subject throughout his life. He depicted it in a variety of different moods – in lively colors with foaming white waves, in somber fog, in the glow of the setting sun and under blue skies.

Crnčić's most important legacy is his graphical work. Trained in the European tradition, he achieved a high level of professionalism. His portrait work was realistic, solid and balanced. The same realism is present in his larger compositions, such as his coloured etchings of old Zagreb, which are freer in the drawing and painting, and evoke an impression accentuated by color.

== Works ==
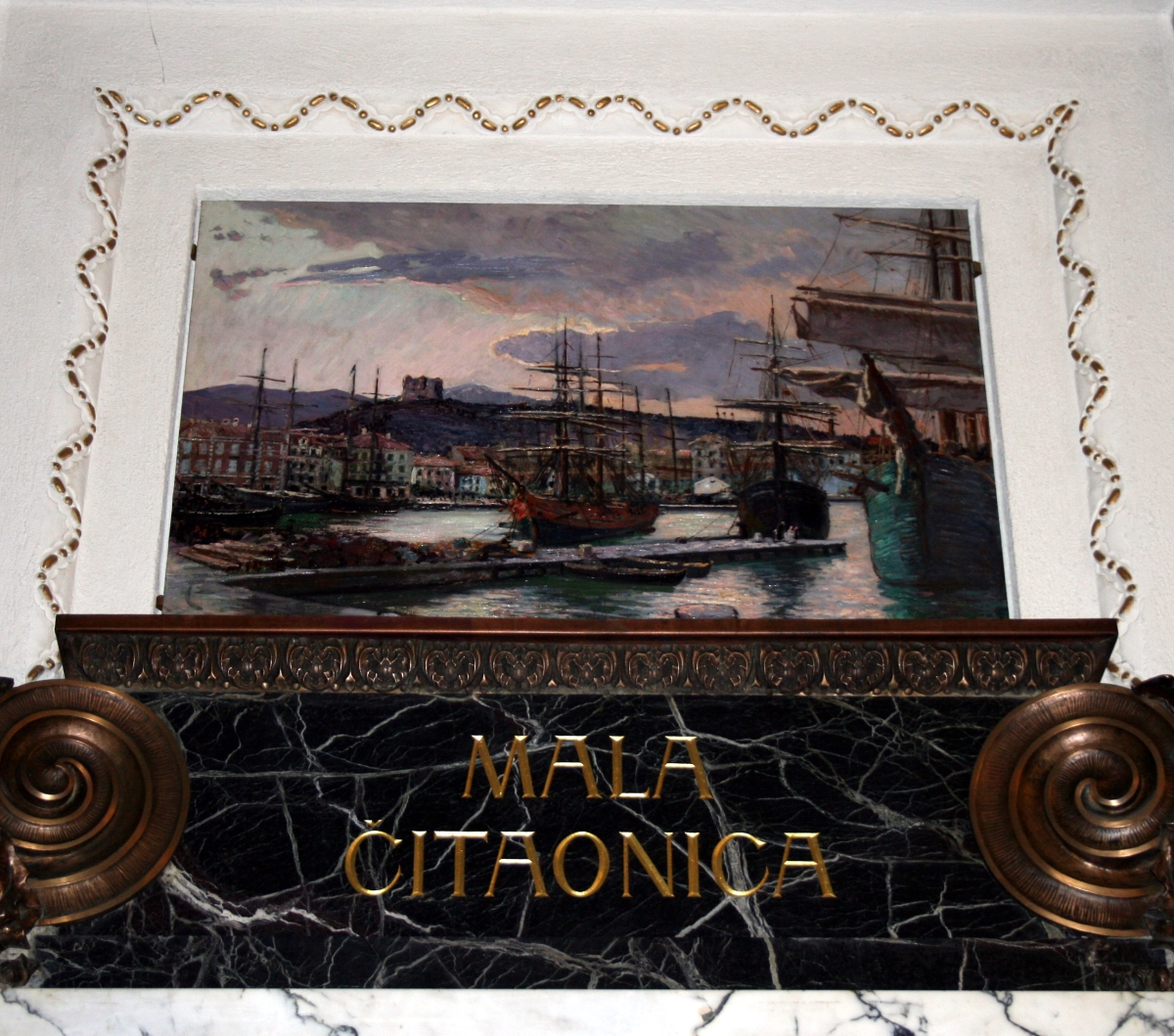
"Senj" by Menci Clement Crnčić is one of five oil paintings on display in the atrium of the Croatian State Archives in Zagreb

- Old Man Shelling Corn (Starac runi kukuruz)
- Portrait of a Girl (Portret djevojčice)
- Blossoming Barberry
- Calm (Bonaca)
- Marina
- More (Sea)
- Plase
- Rain
- Sunday in Lovran (Nedjela u Lovranu)
- Senj

== Exhibitions ==
=== Solo ===
- 1991 Menci Clement Crnčić Retrospective Exhibition - Art Pavilion Zagreb, (Umjetnički paviljon)
- 1911-1930 Ulrich salon, Zagreb
- 1902 E. Artina salon in Vienna
- 1900/1901 Art Pavilion, Zagreb

=== Group ===
- 2009-2010 From The Holdings Of The Museum Of Modern Art Dubrovnik Works From The End Of The 19th to the Beginning of the 21st Century December 18, 2009 – end of February 2010
- 2009 Zagreb - Munich - Croatian painting and Academy of Fine Arts in Munich - Umjetnicki paviljon / Art Pavilion Zagreb, Zagreb
- 1926 Yugoslav graphic artists in Zurich and St. Gallen
- 1906 Exhibition of The Association of Yugoslav Artists "Lada" in Sofia, Bulgaria
- 1903 Croatian Artists exhibits in Zagreb and Prague
- 1902 International Exhibition in Opatija
- 1894-97 Group exhibitions of the Croatian Art Society (Društva hrvatskih umjetnika) in Zagreb, Budapest, St. Petersburg, Paris. Group exhibits in Opatija

=== Public Collections ===
- Modern Gallery, Zagreb
- Museum of Modern Art Dubrovnik, Dubrovnik
- Zagreb University Library Print Collection
- Museum of Modern and Contemporary Art, Rijeka, Print Collection
- Croatian History Museum Print Collection
- Albertina collection in Vienna
