= Academy of Fine Arts, University of Zagreb =

Fine arts school of the University of Zagreb

Academy of Fine Arts Zagreb
- Akademija likovnih umjetnosti u Zagrebu (ALU)
- Type: Public
- Established: 1907
- Dean: Tomislav Buntak
- Students: 365
- Location: Zagreb, Croatia; 45°48′44″N 15°57′45″E
- Website: alu.hr

The Academy of Fine Arts Zagreb (Croatian: Akademija likovnih umjetnosti u Zagrebu or ALU) is a Croatian art school based in Zagreb. It is one of the three art academies affiliated with the University of Zagreb, along with the Academy of Dramatic Art (ADU) and the Academy of Music (MUZA).

== History ==
The Academy was established in June 1907 as the Royal College for Arts and Crafts (Croatian: Kraljevsko zemaljsko više obrazovalište za umjetnost i umjetni obrt) and initially had three departments, for sculpting, painting and art education. Academy's first professors were Robert Frangeš-Mihanović, Rudolf Valdec, Robert Auer, Oton Iveković, Bela Čikoš Sesija, Menci Klement Crnčić and Branko Šenoa. The Academy is still based in its original location at 85 Ilica street in Zagreb.

Since 1926 the architecture department was briefly active at the academy, and was headed by Drago Ibler. The graphic arts department was established in 1956, the restoration department in 1997 and the department for animation and new media in 1998.

Today the academy has six departments, with a total of 365 students enrolled.

== Departments ==
The Academy currently has six departments:

- Painting department
- Graphic arts department
- Sculpting department
- Art education department
- Conservation-restoration department
- Animation and new media department

== Notable faculty ==
- Antun Augustinčić
- Vladimir Becić
- Robert Frangeš Mihanović
- Drago Ibler
- Oton Iveković
- Frano Kršinić
- Ivan Meštrović
- Ivan Ladislav Galeta
- Ivan Sabolić
- Miroslav Šutej
- Milan Trenc
- Maksimilijan Vanka

== Notable alumni ==
- Marina Abramović
- Otti Berger
- Ivica Buljan
- Vera Dajht-Kralj
- Braco Dimitrijević
- Marta Ehrlich
- Oton Gliha
- Fadil Hadžić
- Jacques Hnizdovsky
- Živa Kraus
- Edo Murtić
- Stjepan Planić
- Dimitrije Popović
- Vanja Radauš
- Željko Senečić
- Goran Trbuljak
- Ivana Tomljenović-Meller
- Seka Severin de Tudja
- Edita Schubert
