= Ana Sladetić =

- Born: 1985 (age 40–41); Vukovar, SR Croatia, SFR Yugoslavia
- Website: anasladetic.com

Ana Sladetić (born 1985 in Vukovar, Croatia) is a Croatian contemporary artist with over 105 group exhibitions and 11 solo exhibitions in Europe and Abroad. In her PhD dissertation, "A Visual Assay of Purity", she wrote a description of the technical composition of production, and of stabilization of thermochromic ink on original watercolor.

== Biography ==
Sladetić finished a PhD in 2016 and a MFA in 2009 from the Academy of Fine Arts in Zagreb.

She has participated in over 105 group and 11 solo exhibitions in Europe and abroad. She has won several awards, including the Ex Aequo at the 25th Slavonian Biennial, Osijek Museum of Art, in 2016; and the Grand Prize at the 2009 30th Youth Salon, Croatian Association of Artists, Zagreb. She has held several public lectures and workshops in cooperation with domestic and foreign cultural institutions, museums and galleries. She was an artist in residence in Germany, Belgium, France, Finland and the United States.

She is an assistant at the Academy of Arts, University of Osijek.

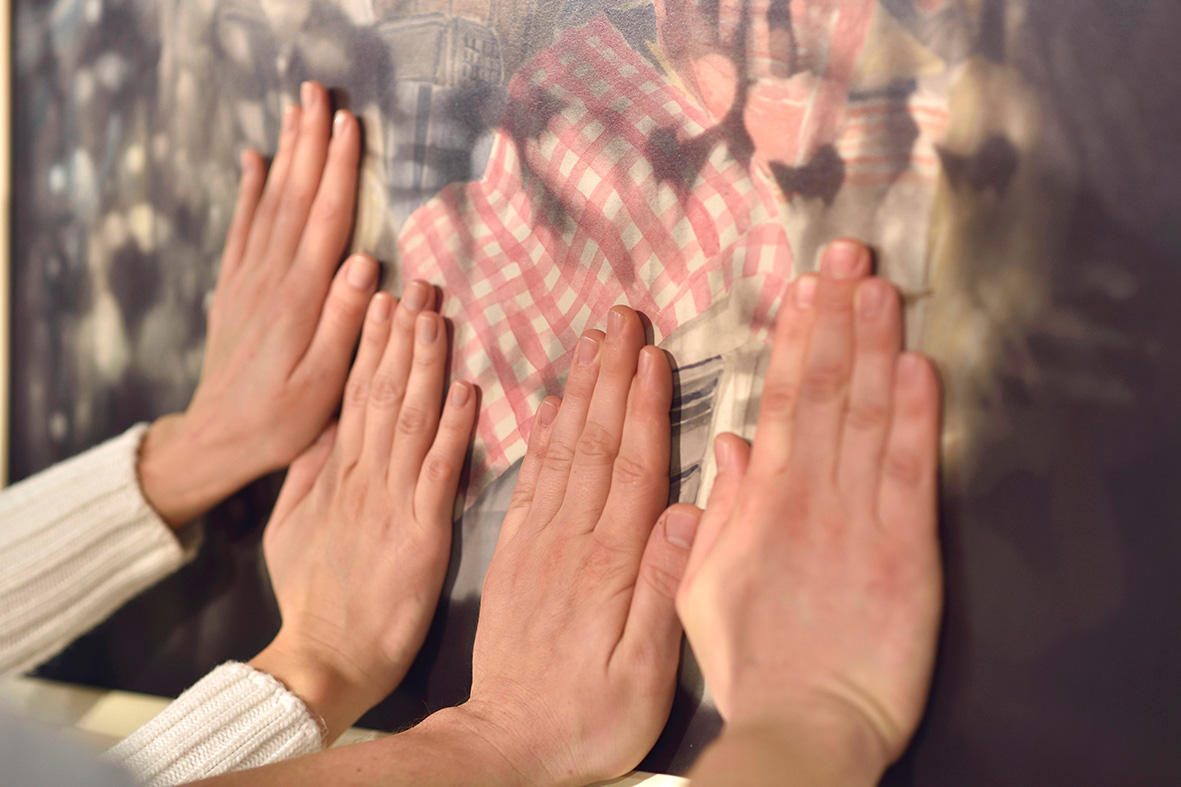
Clean&Wrong, interaction

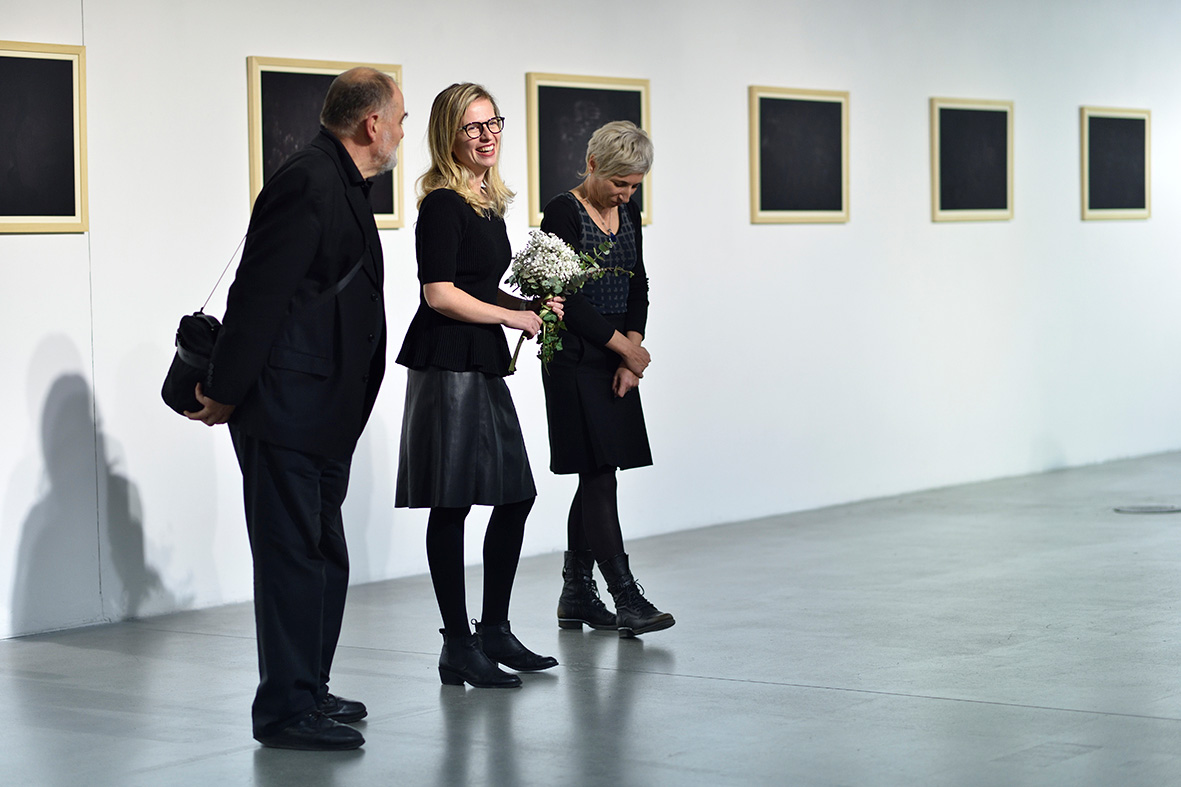
Clean&Wrong, opening of the exhibition

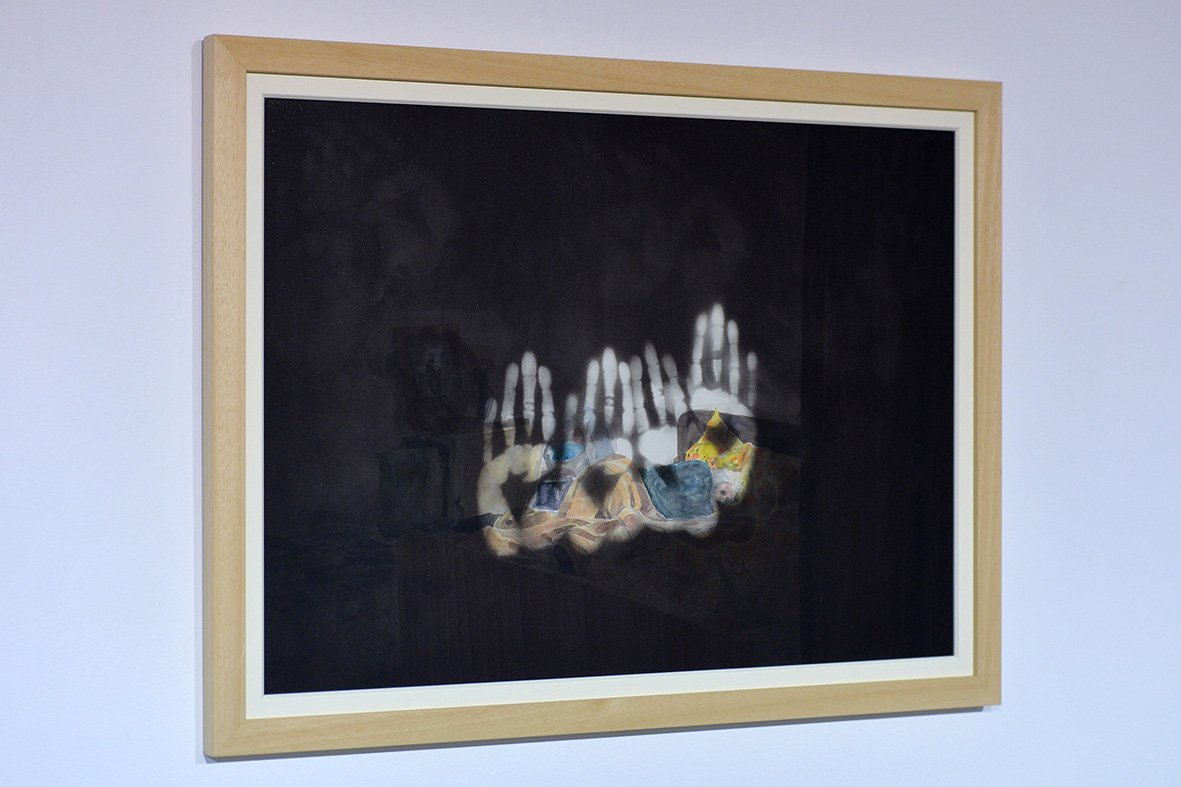
Clean&Wrong, traces of interaction
