= Živa Kraus =

Croatian painter (born 1945)

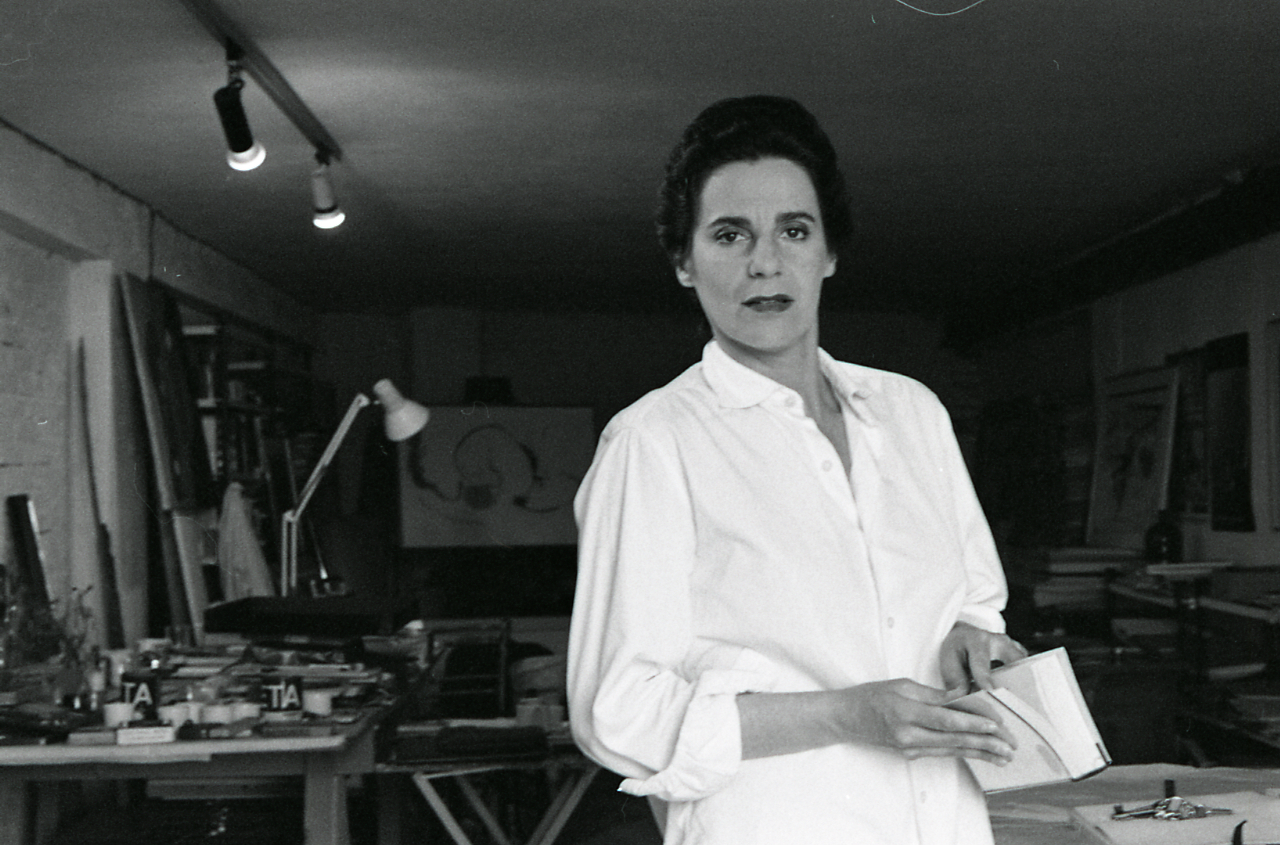
- Živa Kraus photographed by Paolo Monti in Venice, 1981
- Born: 4 October 1945 (age 80); Zagreb, Croatia, Yugoslavia
- Education: University of Zagreb
- Occupation: Painter
- Relatives: Ognjen Kraus (twin brother)

Živa Kraus (born 4 October 1945 in Zagreb, Croatia, Yugoslavia) is a Croatian painter.

== Early life ==
Kraus was born in Zagreb to a Jewish family, father Ivo Kraus and mother Herma (née Delpin). Her twin brother is Ognjen Kraus, president of the Jewish community in Zagreb.

== Education and later years ==
She studied painting at the Academy of Fine Arts Zagreb, where she organized her first solo exhibition. In 1970, Kraus was an assistant to Peggy Guggenheim. Kraus is the owner of the Ikona gallery in Venice, Italy, where she came in 1971 and in which city she currently resides.

== See also ==
- Ognjen Kraus

== Bibliography ==
- Snješka Knežević, Aleksander Laslo (2011). Židovski Zagreb. Zagreb: AGM, Židovska općina Zagreb. ISBN 978-953-174-393-8.
