= Hugo Ehrlich =

Croatian architect (1879–1936)

- Born: 31 January 1879; Zagreb, Austro-Hungarian Monarchy, (now Croatia)
- Died: 21 September 1936 (aged 57); Zagreb, Kingdom of Yugoslavia
- Education: Vienna University of Technology
- Relatives: Herman and Marija Ehrlich (parents); Mira Klobučar (sister); Marta Ehrlich (niece)

Hugo Ehrlich (Croatian pronunciation: [xǔːgo ěːrlix]; 31 January 1879 – 21 September 1936) was a Croatian architect.

== Early life and education ==
Ehrlich was born in Zagreb to a wealthy Jewish family of builder and entrepreneur Herman Ehrlich and his wife Marija (née Eisner). His maternal grandfather was Zagreb's Rabbi. He was raised together with his brothers, Adolf, Ernest, Đuro and sister Mira. In 1897, Ehrlich enrolled in the Vienna University of Technology, just like his brother Đuro had a few years before. He studied under architect Carl König, for whom he worked as an associate in the König studio. After graduation from the university, Ehrlich stayed in Vienna, where he worked for Humbert Walcher.

== Career ==
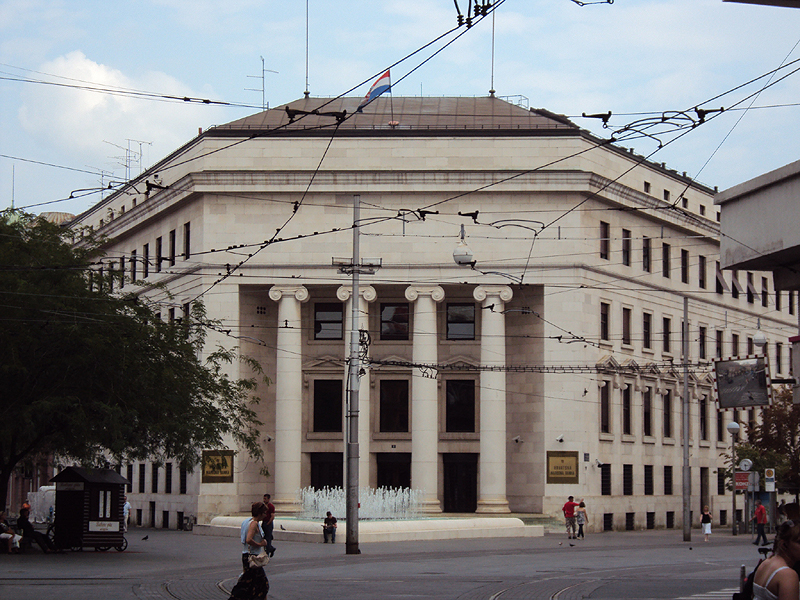
Croatian National Bank, designed by Viktor Kovačić, finished by Hugo Ehrlich

Under Walcher, Ehrlich worked on the restoration of the Burg Kreuzenstein. In 1907, he worked on the first project related to his birth city, a new government building. From 1908 to 1912, Ehrlich undertook work on the adaptation of villa Karma in Clarens, near Montreux. Ehrlich returned to Zagreb in 1909. In Zagreb, he worked at his family's architecture studio, but in 1910 he and Viktor Kovačić together formed the Kovačić & Ehrlich studio. Ehrlich's collaboration with Kovačić was marked by three projects in Zagreb. The first was a Jesuit square project that Ehrlich designed with Kovačić. He also worked independently on the Strossmayer promenade. The third project from that period was related to the Vraz walkway. During the Kovačić & Ehrlich collaboration, they designed several residential buildings and family houses. In 1914, while working on the Hungarian railroad school, Ehrlich was mobilized in the Austro-Hungarian Army. In 1915, Ehrlich ended his partnership with Kovačić.

After World War I, Ehrlich worked at the Adolf & Ernest Ehrlich architect studio. During that period, most of his works were designed in the spirit of eclectic mannerism. In the 1920s, Ehrlich designed over twenty residential and commercial properties. From 1921 to 1923 he worked on the head office building of Slavenska Banka. After the death of Viktor Kovačić in the autumn of 1924, Ehrlich took over construction work on the building of the Zagreb Stock Exchange (now Croatian National Bank) together with Alfred Albini and Stjepan Gomboš. The work on the exterior and interior was completed in June 1927. Beginning in 1925, Ehrlich worked as a professor at the University of Zagreb Faculty of Architecture. During that time Ehrlich's studio became one of the largest studios in Zagreb, gathering the most talented generation of architects such as Alfred Albini, Stephen Gomboš, Mladen Kauzlarić, Juraj Denzler and Drago Galić. In 1928, Ehrlich received an invitation for the Congrès International d'Architecture Moderne.

== Death ==
Ehrlich died in Zagreb on 21 September 1936 and was buried at the Mirogoj Cemetery.

== Works ==
- Burg Kreuzenstein castle (restoration), Leobendorf, Austria.
- Villa Karma (restoration), Clarens, Switzerland.
- Residential and commercial buildings, Mihanovićeva street, Zagreb, Croatia.
- Residential and commercial building, Medulićeva street 2, Zagreb, Croatia.
- Residential and commercial building, Ilica 100, Zagreb, Croatia.
- Bauer residential house, Nazor street 6, Zagreb, Croatia.
- Rado residential house, Roko park 7, Zagreb, Croatia.
- Ehrlich residential house, Tuškanac, Zagreb, Croatia.
- Bank commercial building, Osijek, Croatia.
- Branch of the State Mortgage Bank of Yugoslavia, Zagreb, Croatia.
- Zagreb Stock Exchange building, Zagreb, Croatia.
- Yugoslav United Bank, Belgrade, Serbia.
- Residential building, Varšavska street 2, Zagreb, Croatia.
- Palace Bombelles, Opatička street 4, Zagreb, Croatia.
- Residential and commercial building, Boškovićeva street 36, Zagreb, Croatia.
- Palace Janeković, Draškovićeva street 15, Zagreb, Croatia.

== Bibliography ==
- Snješka Knežević, Aleksander Laslo (2011). Židovski Zagreb. Zagreb: AGM, Židovska općina Zagreb. ISBN 978-953-174-393-8.
- Goldstein, Ivo (2005). Židovi u Zagrebu 1918 - 1941. Zagreb: Novi Liber. ISBN 953-6045-23-0.
- Kraus, Ognjen (1998). Dva stoljeća povijesti i kulture Židova u Zagrebu i Hrvatskoj. Zagreb: Židovska općina Zagreb. ISBN 953-96836-2-9.
- Domljan, Žarko (1979). Arhitekt Ehrlich. Zagreb: Društvo povjesničara umjetnosti Hrvatske.
- Vulin Ileković, Dina; Ileković, Boris (June 25, 2024). "Hugo Ehrlich and Villa Karma". Prostor. 32 (1(67)): 2–15.
