= Herman Ehrlich =

- Born: 9 August 1836; Našice, Austrian Empire, (now Croatia)
- Died: 23 October 1895 (aged 59); Zagreb, Austro-Hungarian Monarchy, (now Croatia)
- Spouse: Marija (née Eisner) Ehrlich
- Children: Hugo Ehrlich; Mira Klobučar
- Relatives: Marta Ehrlich (granddaughter)

Herman Ehrlich (1836 – 1895) was a Croatian architect and businessman.

Ehrlich was born in Našice, Croatia on 9 August 1836 to a Jewish family. He was married to Marija (née Eisner) Ehrlich with whom he had five children; Adolf, Ernest, Đuro, Hugo and Mira. From 1863 to 1874 Ehrlich conducted his business in Našice. In 1874 he moved with his family to Zagreb, Croatia. Ehrlich built roads across Slavonia and Croatia. He also built many military facilities, public and private buildings. Due to high quality construction his company was one of the best known in the Kingdom of Croatia-Slavonia and Kingdom of Dalmatia. Ehrlich's company also worked on the regulation of the river Vuka and built the sewage network in Osijek. Ehrlich died on 23 October 1895 in Zagreb and was buried at the Mirogoj Cemetery.

== Bibliography ==
- Snješka Knežević, Aleksander Laslo (2011). Židovski Zagreb. Zagreb: AGM, Židovska općina Zagreb. ISBN 978-953-174-393-8.
