= Marta Ehrlich =

Croatian painter

- Born: 27 April 1910; Zagreb, Austro-Hungarian Empire, (now Croatia)
- Died: 15 March 1980 (aged 69); Zagreb, SFR Yugoslavia
- Education: University of Zagreb
- Spouse: Kamilo Tompa
- Relatives: Herman and Marija Ehrlich (grandparents); Hugo Ehrlich (uncle); Mira Klobučar (aunt)

Marta Ehrlich (27 April 1910 – 15 March 1980) was a Croatian painter.

== Biography ==
Ehrlich was born in Zagreb on 27 April 1910. She was raised in a wealthy Jewish family of Ernest and Erna Laura Ehrlich. Her father was a building contractor and her mother was a school teacher. The Ehrlichs were a notable Zagreb family, her uncle was the architect Hugo Ehrlich and her aunt was the painter and Holocaust survivor Mira Klobučar. Before World War II, Ehrlich lived with her parents and two siblings at a villa in Tuškanac which was designed by her uncle Hugo Ehrlich. She attended elementary and high school in Zagreb. Ehrlich graduated from the Academy of Fine Arts, University of Zagreb in 1934. After graduation, Ehrlich went to Paris in 1935, where she perfected her skills in various painting techniques. She stayed in Paris for three years, before returning to Zagreb. After her return to Zagreb, she took private lessons from Vladimir Becić. Ehrlich's early work was marked by Becić's influence. During her career, Ehrlich created a remarkable 227 paintings which constituted an invaluable section of Croatian visual art. Ehrlich was married to Kamilo Tompa, a painter. They lived and worked at their house on Šubićeva street. She painted until 1978, two years before she took her own life. Ehrlich was buried at the Mirogoj Cemetery as Marta Tompa.

== Bibliography ==
- Snješka Knežević, Aleksander Laslo (2011). Židovski Zagreb. Zagreb: AGM, Židovska općina Zagreb. ISBN 978-953-174-393-8.
