= Robert Auer =

Croatian painter (1873–1952)

- Born: 27 November 1873; Zagreb
- Died: 8 March 1952 (aged 78); Zagreb

Robert Auer (27 November 1873 – 8 March 1952 ) was a Croatian Secession painter.

== Biography ==
Robert Auer was born into a wealthy Zagreb family to Ferdinand and Amelija Auer. His brothers were the architect Bela Auer, and Koloman Auer, who inherited a printing press business from his father. Robert attended a technical school before going to university in Vienna and Munich. Following his studies, he became involved in the Zagreb art scene, especially those circles surrounding the Secession movement. Croatian painters of that time were distancing themselves from the traditional style of painting and, like their colleagues in Vienna and Munich, brought a new freedom into art.

Having acquired a reputation as a portraitist among the upper classes, Auer painted over 150 portraits in this period, selling nearly all of them. Auer was the sole Croatian painter to be included in the Munich Secession Exhibition of 1896. He established his art studio in his own home in Rokovo Perivoj (Roko's Park), which was near the Vila Auer, his parents' villa, where he had grown up. Along with his wife, the painter Leopoldina Auer-Schmidt, he led a private school while also teaching at the technical school and holding a professorship at the Academy of Fine Arts, University of Zagreb.

== Works ==
Auer's style is typically associated with the Secession due to his studies at the Viennese and Munich academies being precisely during the time that the Secession was on the ascent on the cultural landscape of Central Europe. As a young painter, Auer quickly absorbed the stylistic character of this new direction. As a professor at the Academy of Fine Arts, University of Zagreb, Auer led the decorative arts department. In addition to his many portraits, he also completed a similar opus of symbolic and allegorical compositions. Although his work was declared "bourgeoisie" following the Second World War by the communist government and marginalized as bearing the trace of aestheticized high culture, his works continued to be sought after by collectors of the Croatian modern.

Robert Auer was not a follower of trends or fashions, consistently following a single artistic concept during his entire career. His strong technique and mastery of medium ensured a steady stream of commissions. In the spirit of the Secession, he also delved into other decorative arts such as doors, furniture etc.

Following a 70-year hiatus in exhibitions, a retrospective of over one hundred of Auer's works was held at the Klovićevi Dvori Gallery in 2010.
