= Vera Dajht-Kralj =

Croatian sculptor

- Born: Vera Deucht; 11 December 1928; Zagreb, Kingdom of Yugoslavia (present-day Republic of Croatia)
- Died: 16 May 2014 (aged 85); Zagreb, Croatia
- Education: University of Zagreb
- Occupation: Sculptor

Vera Dajht-Kralj (née Deucht; 11 December 1928 – 16 May 2014) was a Croatian sculptor.

Vera Deucht was born on 11 December 1928 in Zagreb to a Jewish family. Her paternal great-grandparents had moved to Croatia from Hungary two centuries before her birth. She graduated from the Academy of Fine Arts, University of Zagreb. In 1953, she finished her postgraduate education at the Académie des Beaux-Arts.

She was a member of the Croatian Association of Artists since 1955. From 1952, she participated in more than 70 solo and group exhibitions at home and abroad. From 1954 onward, she made ten monuments and proposed about twenty sculptures ideas for public spaces in Zagreb. In 1991, her sculpture Prozor (Window) was displayed on Tkalčićeva Street, Zagreb. She died in 2014, aged 85.

Her legacy is being preserved and promoted by the Živi atelje Dajht Kralj association, based in Ilica 110 in Zagreb, in the atelier where she worked for most of her life.
