= Robert Frangeš-Mihanović =

Croatian sculptor

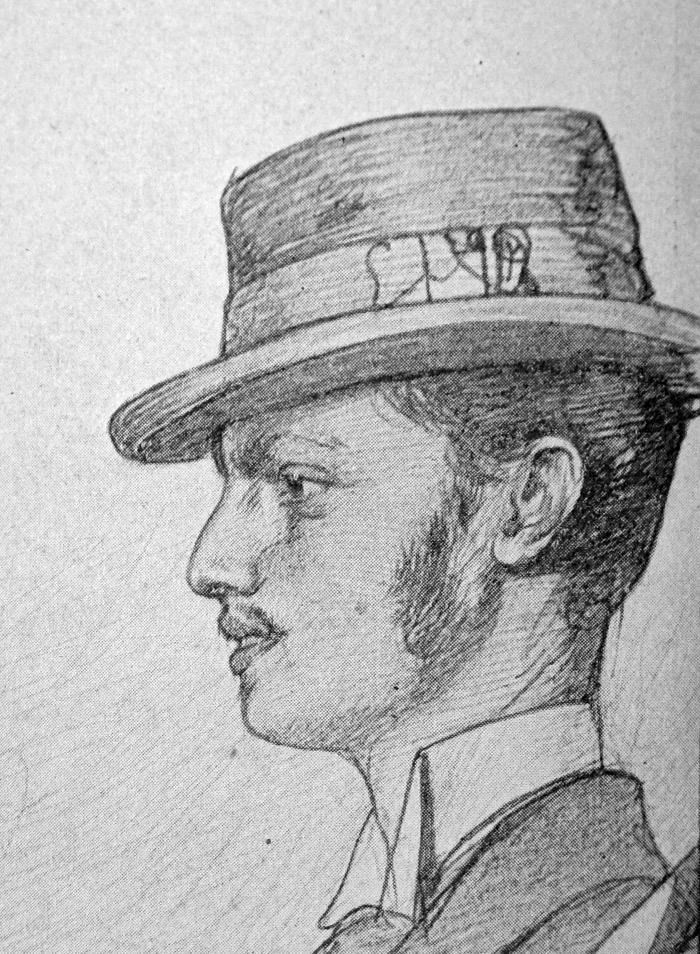
- Frangeš-Mihanović in an 1893 drawing by Christian Wilhelm Allers
- Born: 2 October 1872; Sremska Mitrovica, Croatia-Slavonia, Austria-Hungary
- Died: 12 January 1940 (aged 67); Zagreb, Banovina of Croatia, Kingdom of Yugoslavia
- Known for: Sculpture

Robert Frangeš-Mihanović (2 October 1872 – 12 January 1940) was a Croatian sculptor. He was a pioneer of modern Croatian sculpture. He was also a prominent figure in the artistic scene in Zagreb at the turn of the Twentieth Century.

== Life ==
Frangeš-Mihanović was born on 2 October 1872 in Sremska Mitrovica, at the time part of Austria-Hungary (now in Serbia). He graduated from the School of Crafts in Zagreb in 1889. Then he went to Vienna, where he studied at the Arts and Crafts School (1889–1894) and the Art Academy (1894-1895). He continued his studies in Paris (1900-1901), where he met Auguste Rodin and Medardo Rosso.

Frangeš Mihanović taught at the School of Crafts in Zagreb (1895–1907). He also taught sculpture at the Art Academy. He was one of the initiators and organizers of the artistic life in Zagreb at the turn of the century, as one of the founders of the Croatian Artists' Society (1897), the folklore society of Lado (1904), and the Art Academy (1907). He founded the bronze foundry at the Academy and brought the first founders. He was a member of several academies: JAZU, SANU and the Prague academy. He died in Zagreb. Along with Rudolf Valdec, Frangeš Mihanović was a pioneer of modern Croatian sculpture.

== Works ==
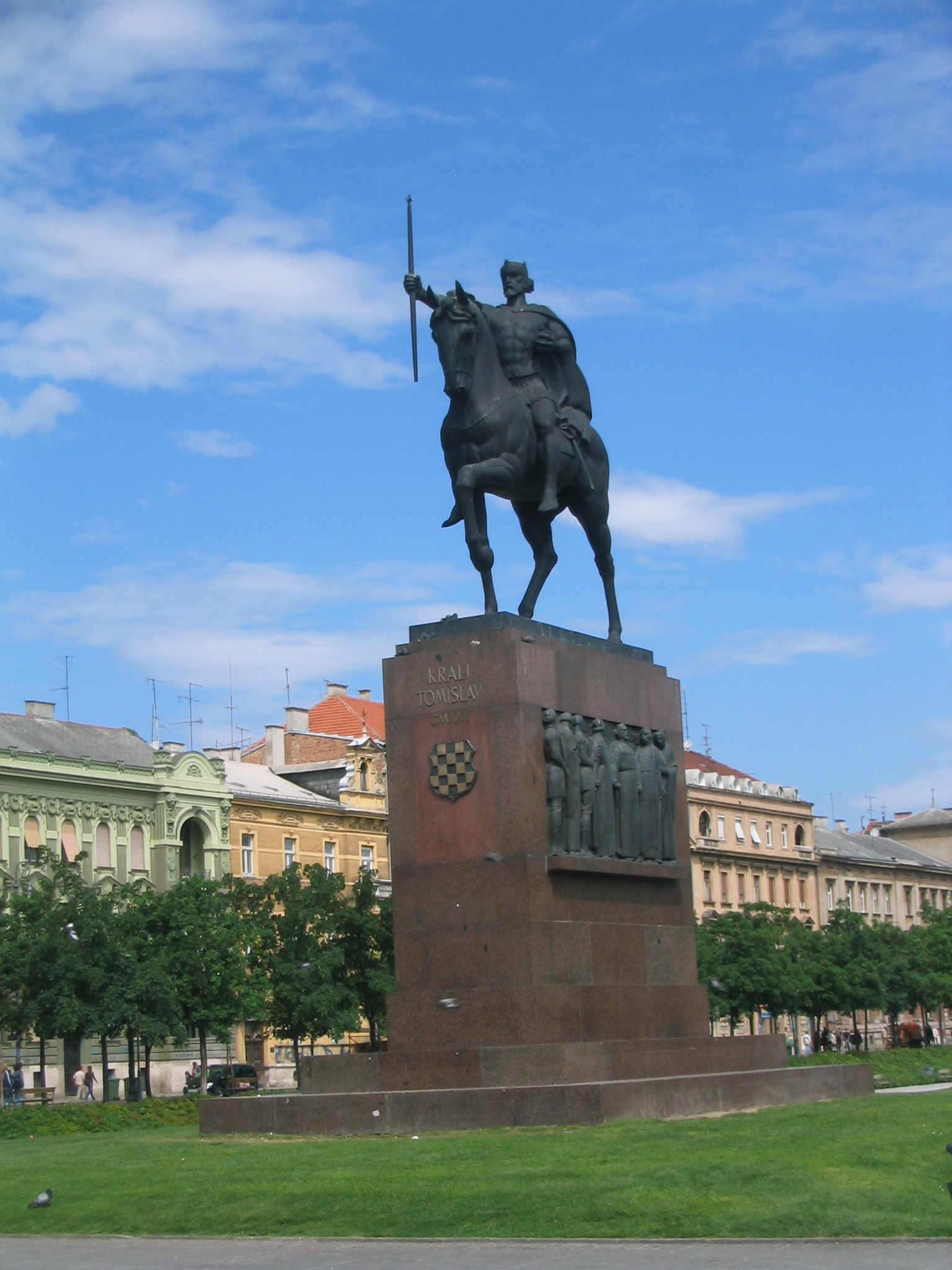
Frangeš-Mihanović's equestrian statue of King Tomislav in Zagreb, opposite the central railway station, installed in 1947

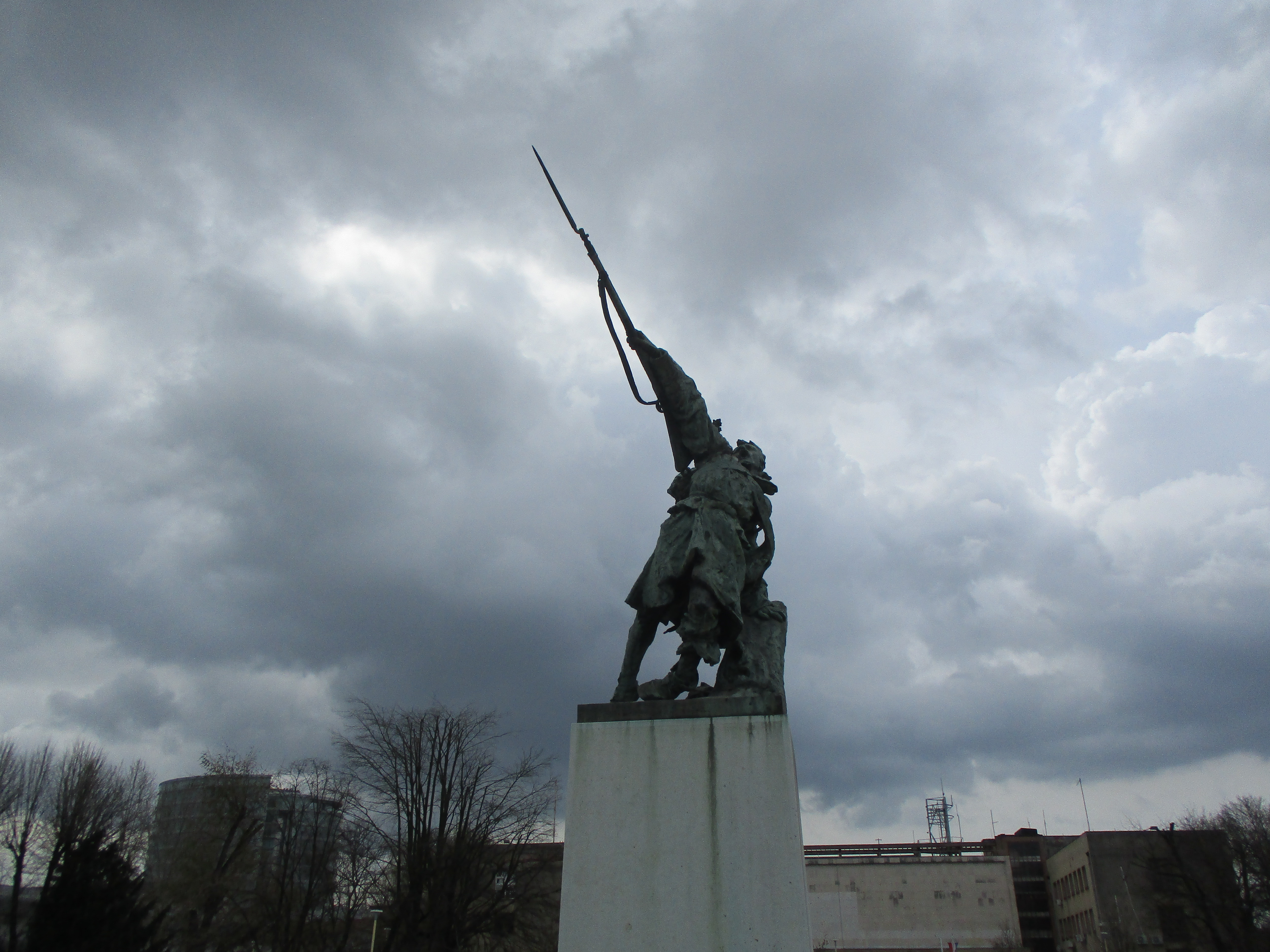
Monument to Croatian unknown soldier in Osijek

His medals and certificates with figurative and animal themes - Heracles the Bull (1899),Vineyard Workers (1900), Turkey (1904), and Laborer (1906) - are the starting point of Croatian medal making. He created statuettes, such as Timidity (1902), Flight to Egypt (1906), The Rape of Europa (1907); portraits, such as V. Lisinski (1895); busts, such as Antun Mihanović (1908) in Klanjec and Antun and Stjepan Radić (1936) in Trebarjevo Desno.

In 1897, he made The Dying Soldier, a monument to the fallen soldiers of Šokčević's 78th Regiment in Osijek. Along with his Philosophy (1897) in Zagreb, The Dying Soldier is the earliest example of impressionism in Croatian sculpture. His most monumental work is the equestrian sculpture King Tomislav (made in 1928–38, installed in 1947 in Zagreb). He also made graveyard statues in Varaždin (Monument to Death on the Leitner family tomb, 1906) and Mirogoj (Worker on the Muller family tomb, 1935). He made architectural sculptural elements on buildings in Zagreb, such as the allegorical reliefs of Philosophy, Theology, Medicine, and Frustration on the State Archive.

His opus spans the styles of academism, symbolism, and modernism (impressionism). In his mature phase, he developed a personal style of free realism. He also engaged in artistic crafts.

== Sources ==
- Gareljić, Tatijana (2015). "Robert Frangeš-Mihanović (1872 – 1940)" (PDF) (in Croatian). Modern Gallery, Zagreb.
