= Mira Klobučar =

Croatian painter (1888–1956)

- Born: Mira Ehrlich; 28 July 1888; Zagreb, Austro-Hungarian Monarchy, (now Croatia)
- Died: 10 July 1956 (aged 67); Zagreb, SFR Yugoslavia .
- Known for: Painting
- Relatives: Herman and Marija Ehrlich (parents); Hugo Ehrlich (brother); Marta Ehrlich (niece)

Mira Klobučar (born Mira Ehrlich; July 28, 1888 – died July 10, 1956) was a Croatian painter.

Klobučar was born in Zagreb on July 28, 1888, to a wealthy Jewish family of Herman and Marija (née Eisner) Ehrlich, and was raised with four siblings; Adolf, Ernest, Đuro and Hugo. After the death of her father, her mother sent her away to gymnasium Sacré Cœur in Vienna. After gymnasium, she was educated at the City and Guilds of London Art School. Klobučar's body of work was small, because she painted only in particular moments of inspiration. From 1933 to 1940, she held exhibitions as a member of the Artists' Club, and as a member of the Croatian Association of Artists. Klobučar was married to Viktor Klobučar, with whom she lived in a villa designed by her brother Hugo Ehrlich, a known Croatian architect. Although she was forced to wear yellow star of David on her clothes, Klobučar survived the Holocaust. She died in Zagreb in 1956.
