= Museum of Contemporary Art, Zagreb =

Museum of Contemporary Art
- Muzej suvremene umjetnosti
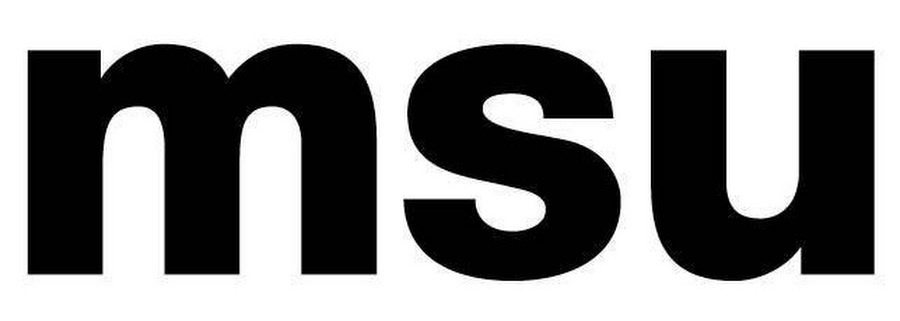

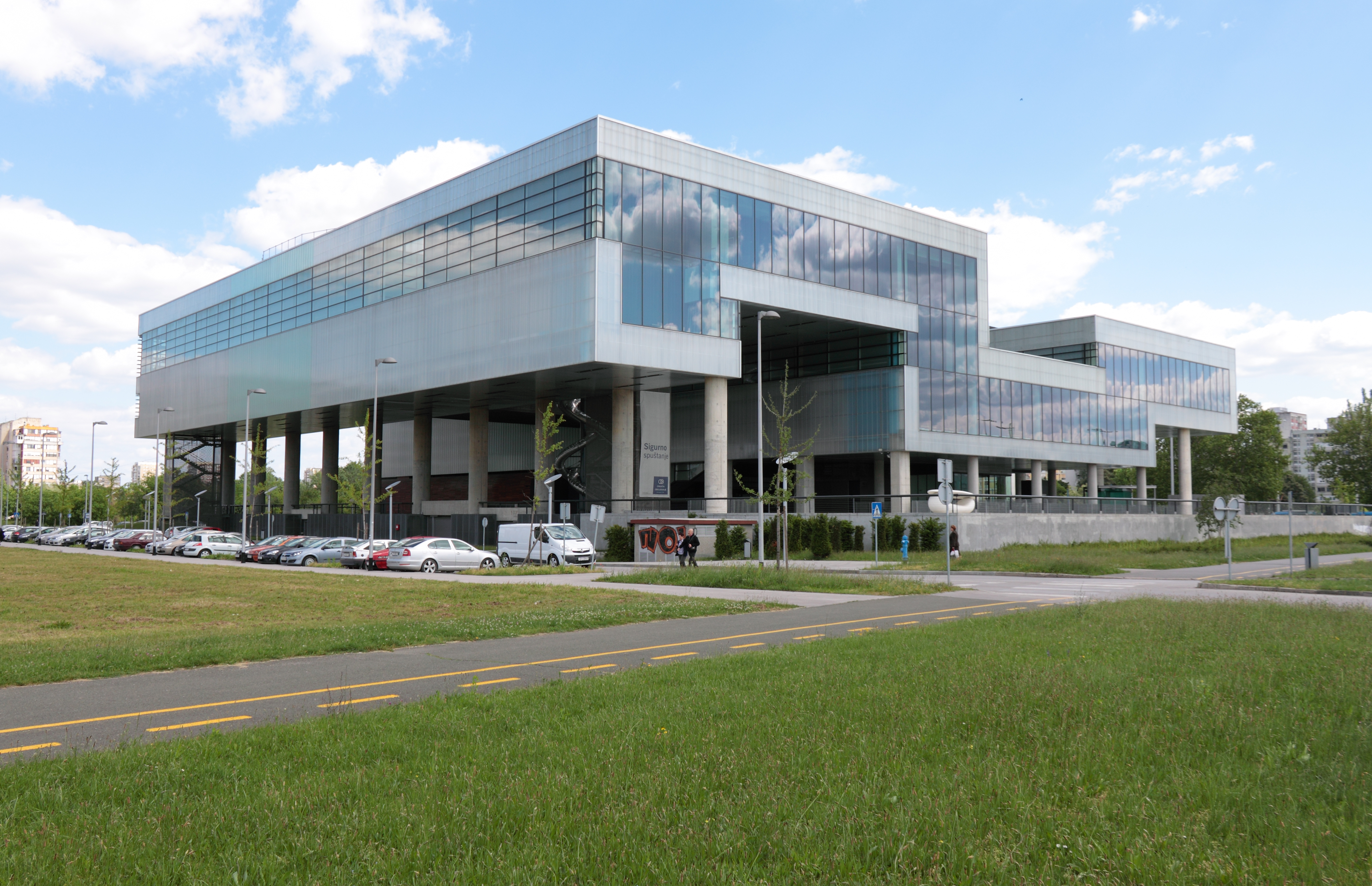
- Location: Sopot, Novi Zagreb, Zagreb, Croatia
- Coordinates: 45°46′41″N 15°58′51″E
- Type: Art museum
- Collection size: 12,000 objects
- Visitors: 77,998 (2017)
- Director: Vesna Meštrić
- Website: www.msu.hr

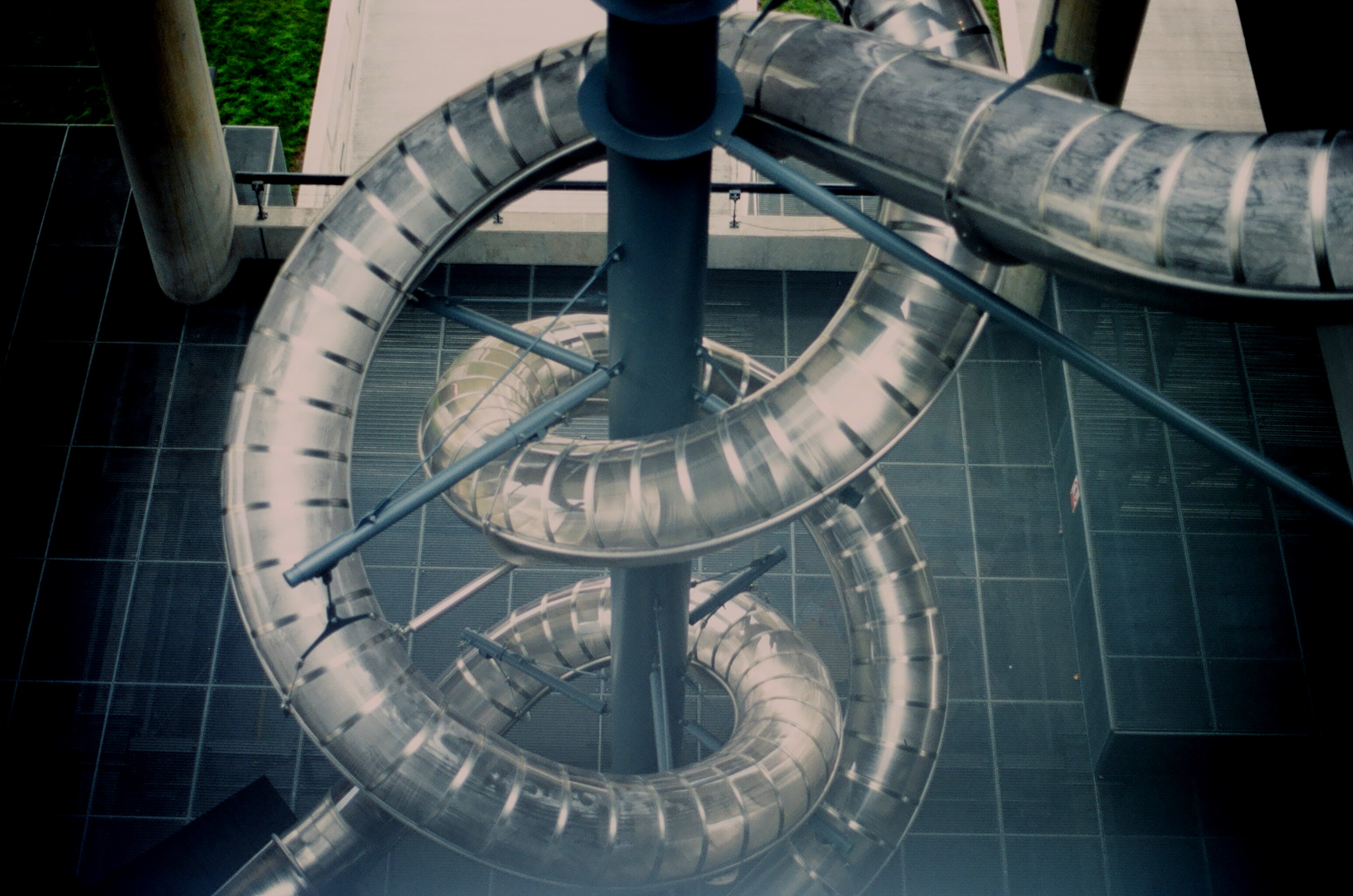
Carsten Höller's Double Slide was custom-made for the museum.

The Museum of Contemporary Art (Croatian: Muzej suvremene umjetnosti, often abbreviated to MSU) is a contemporary art museum located on Dubrovnik Avenue in Zagreb, Croatia. It is the biggest and most modern museum in the country. Vesna Meštrić is current director of MSU, replacing Zdenka Badovinac in late 2023 first temporarily and as of 2024 officially.

== History ==
The museum traces its origins from the City Gallery of Contemporary Art which was established in 1954. The gallery was located at the Kulmer Palace in the Upper Town area and also housed the Center for Photography, Film and Television and a museum library. Due to lack of space the original museum never had a permanent display.

== Architecture ==
In 1998, a decision was made to move the museum to a brand new building on the corner of Dubrovnik and Većeslav Holjevac avenues in Novi Zagreb district.

A competition for the building's design was held, and architect Igor Franić's design was chosen out of 85 entries submitted. The cornerstone for the new building was laid in November 2003, and the new museum finally opened on 11 December 2009, after six years of construction which was beset with several delays. Originally planned to cost around 200 million HRK, the cost eventually amounted to 450 million HRK (around 84 million US$), invested in equal parts by the Ministry of Culture and the City of Zagreb.

The present building has a total area of 14,600 m^{2}, out of which 3,500 m^{2} is reserved for its permanent collection and around 1,500 m^{2} is designated for occasional exhibitions. The building also houses a library, a multimedia hall, a bookstore, cafe and a restaurant.

== Permanent Collection ==
The museum houses a total of 12,000 objects (of which around 600 are on permanent display) and numerous works by contemporary Croatian artists, including Vojin Bakić, Boris Bućan, Tošo Dabac, Braco Dimitrijević, Tomislav Gotovac, Benko Horvat, Alexandar Battista Ilić, Sanja Iveković, Anto Jerković, Julije Knifer, Zlatko Kopljar, Ivan Kožarić, Vlado Kristl, Vlado Martek, Dalibor Martinis, Ivan Picelj, Vjenceslav Richter, Edita Schubert, Mladen Stilinović, Miroslav Šutej; as well as international contemporary artists such as Getulio Alviani, Alberto Biasi, Max Bill, Piero Dorazio, Julio Le Parc, Richard Mortensen, Otto Piene, Jesús Rafael Soto, Victor Vasarely, Marina Abramović, Dorothy Cross, Katarzyna Kozyra, etc.

The Test Site metal sculpture by Carsten Höller was installed in the entrance hall of the museum in time for the official opening, as were installations by Braco Dimitrijević and Mirosław Bałka (Eyes of Purification) in front of the building's south side entrance.

== Gallery ==
Art installations in the museum

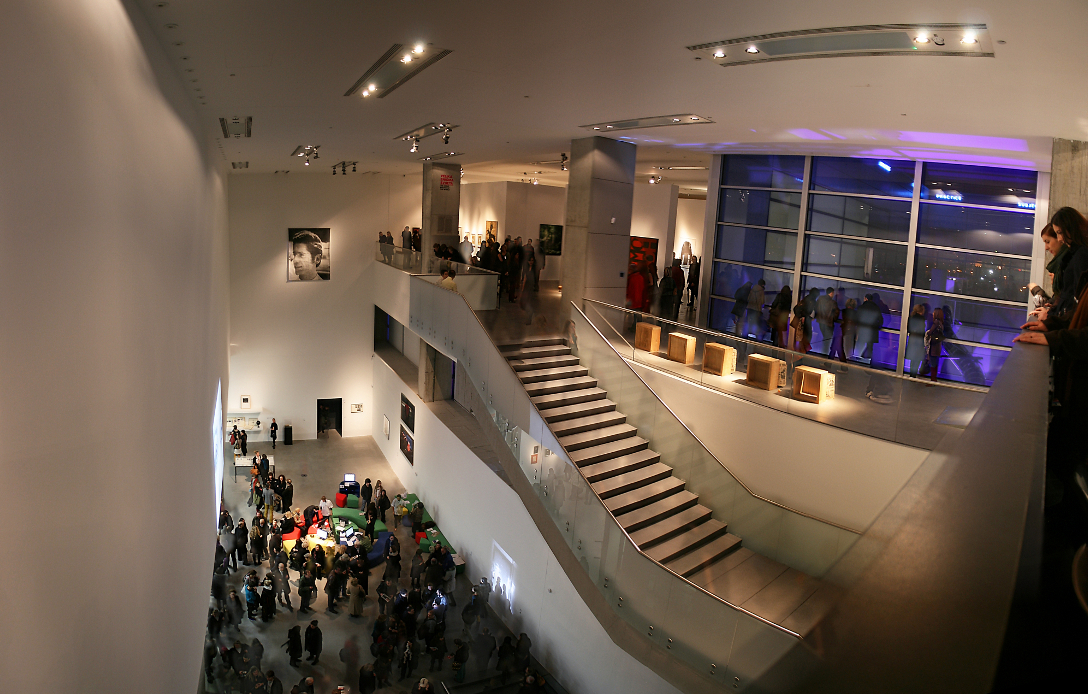
Museum interior

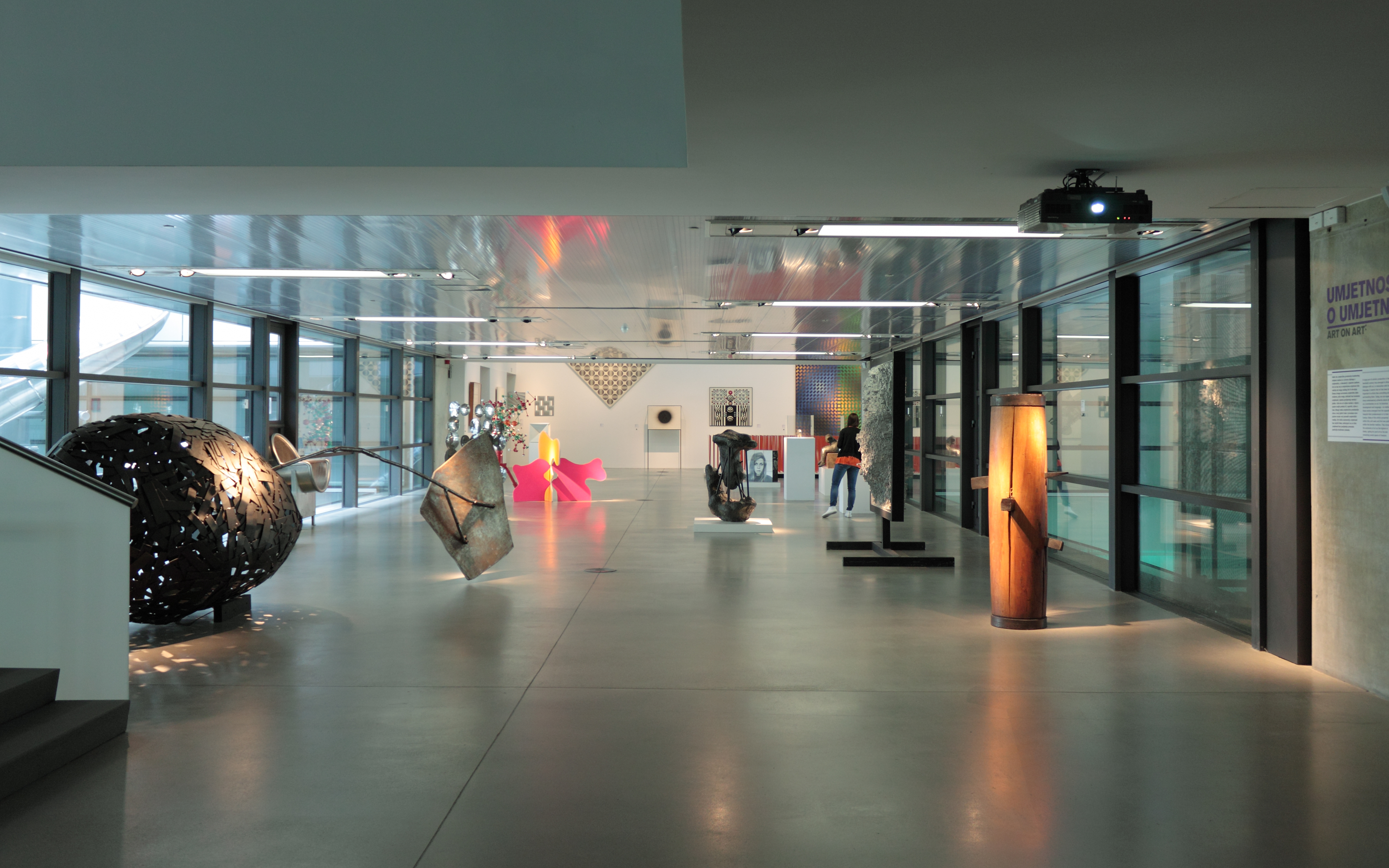

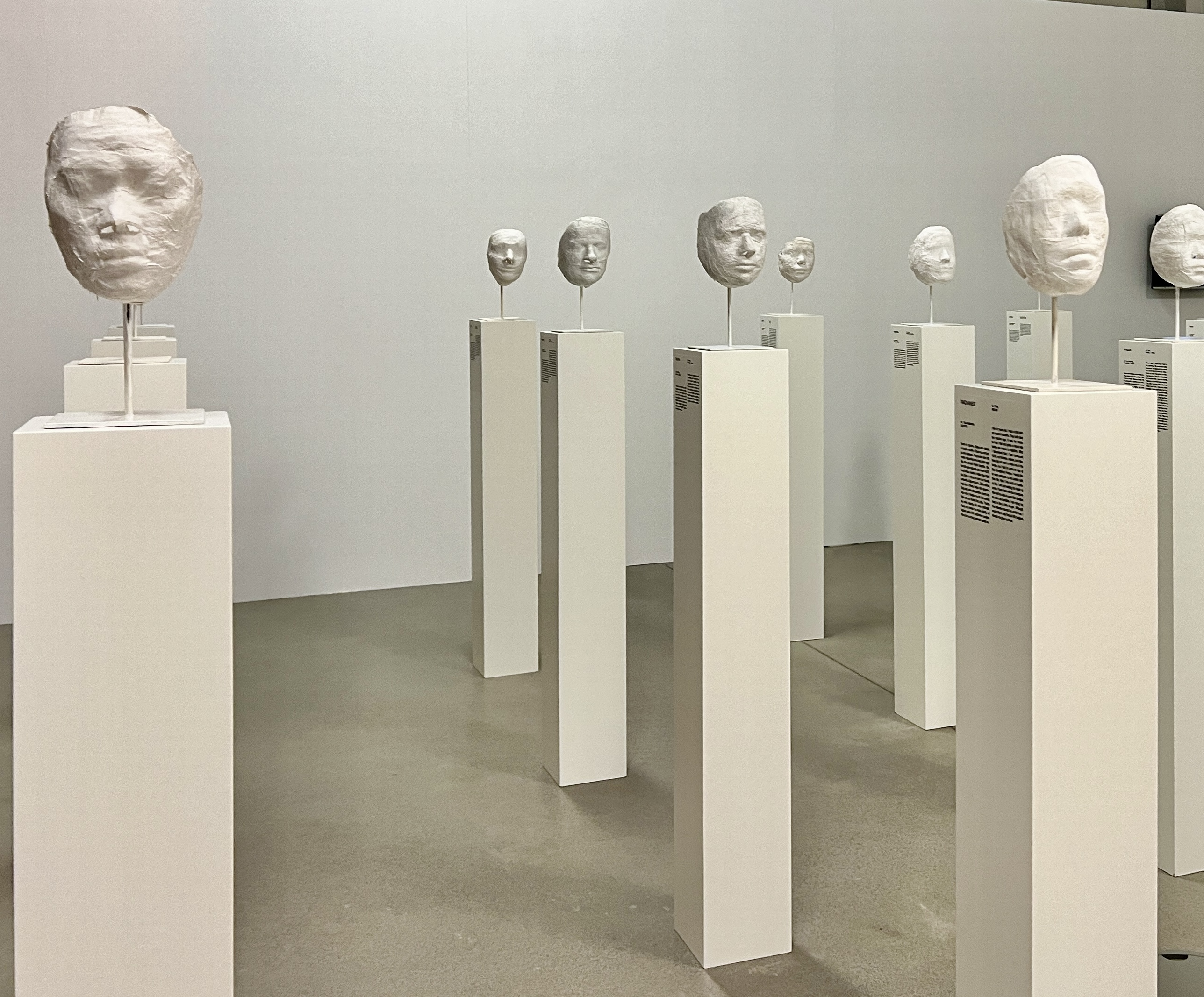

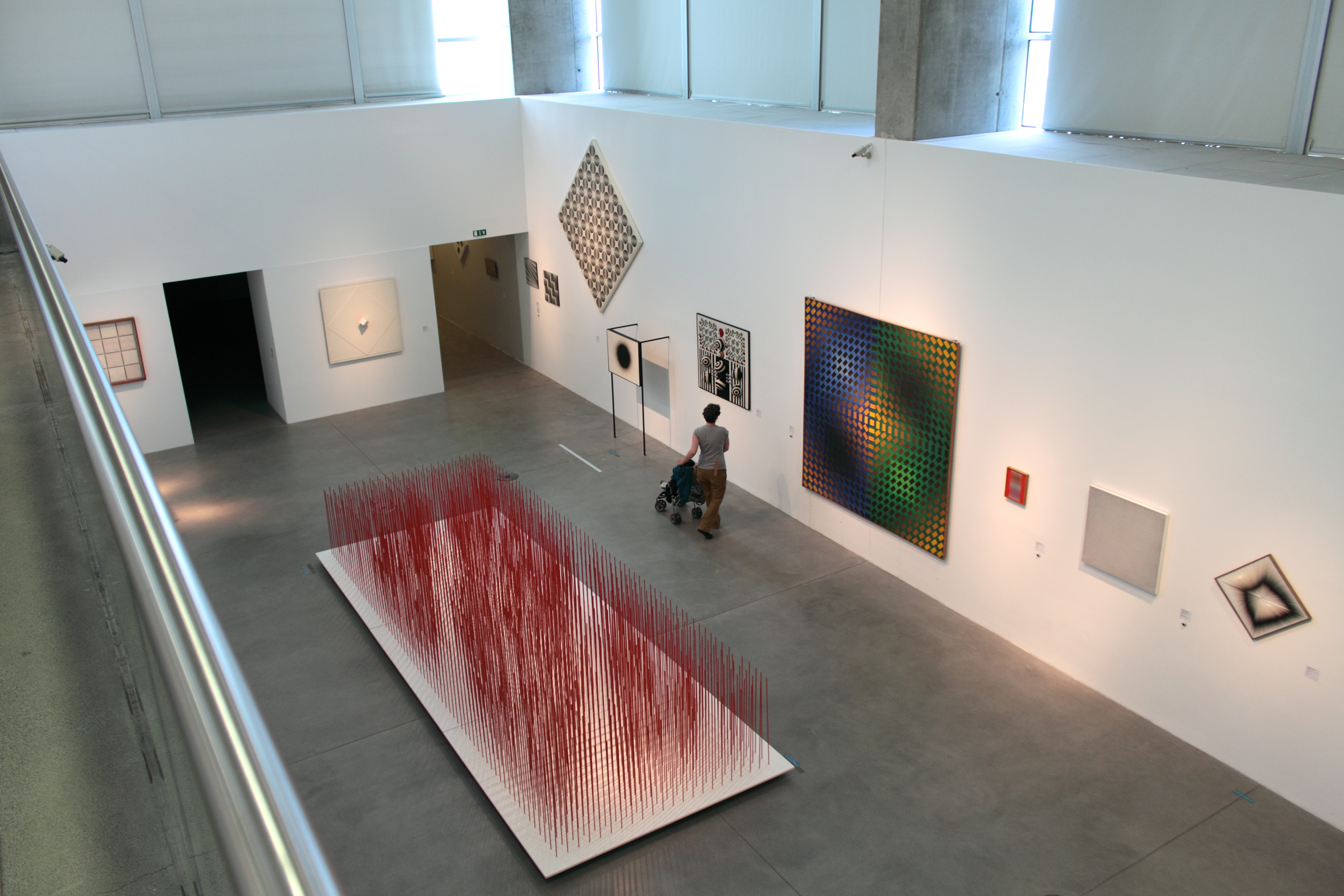

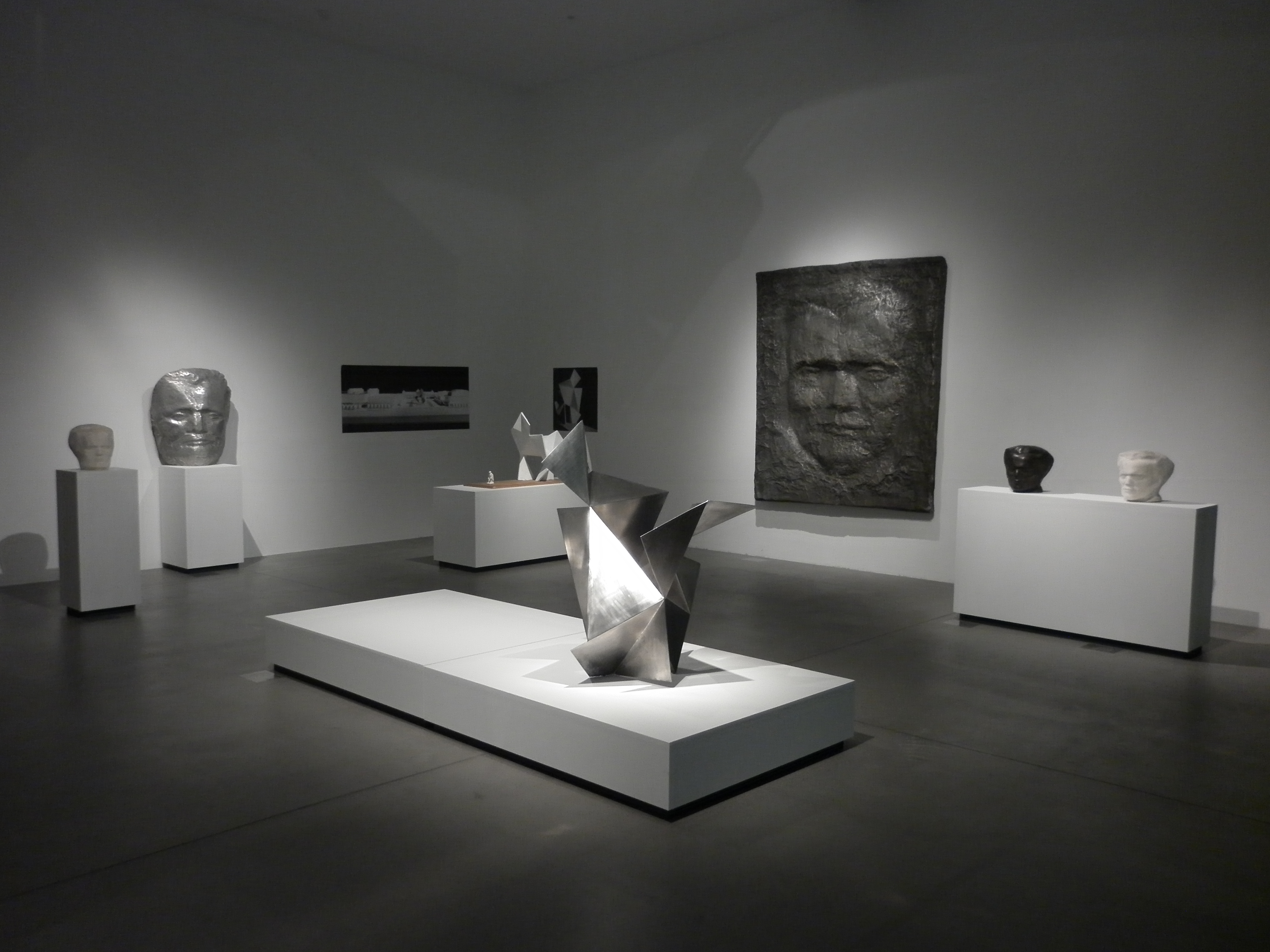

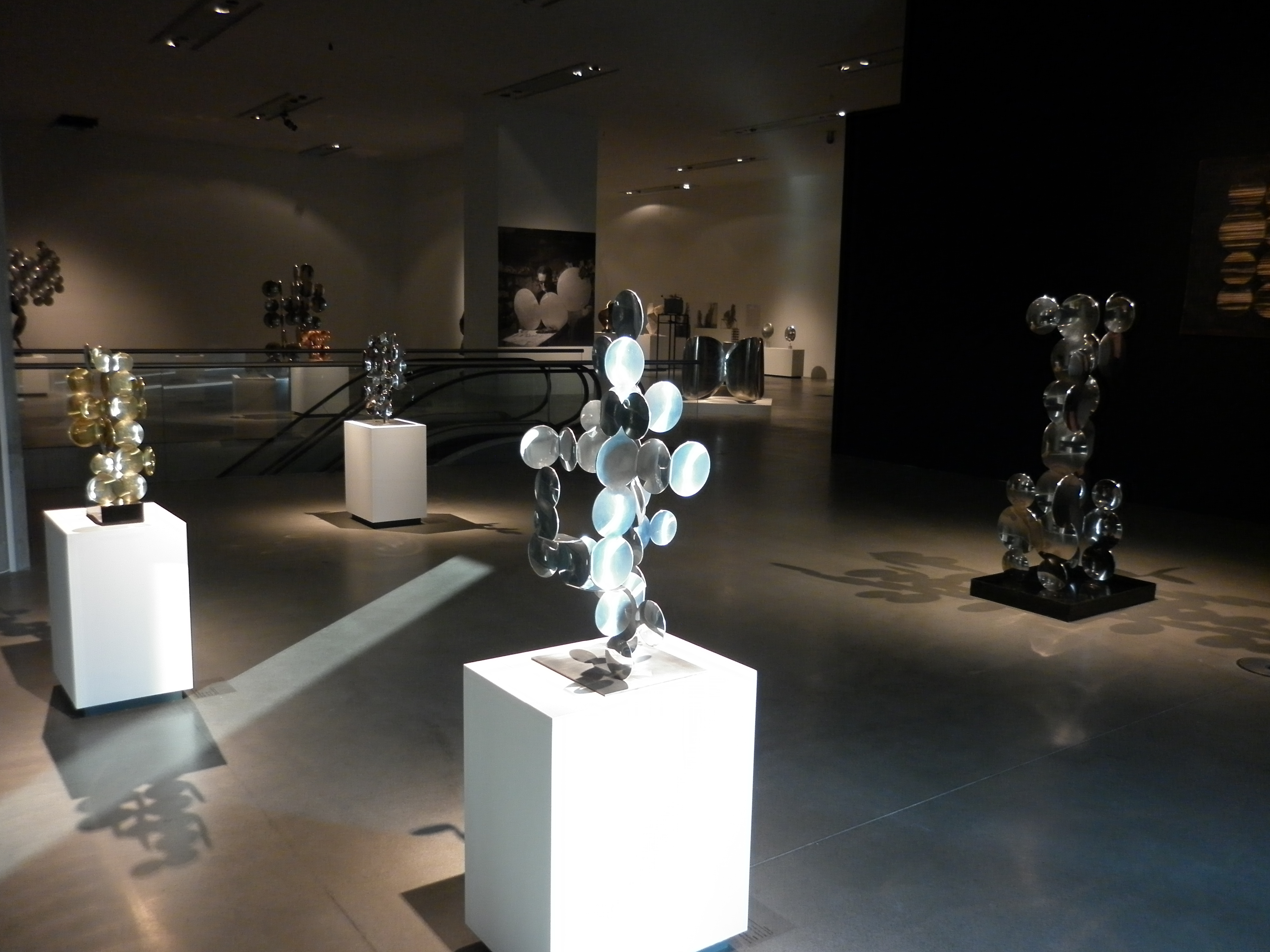

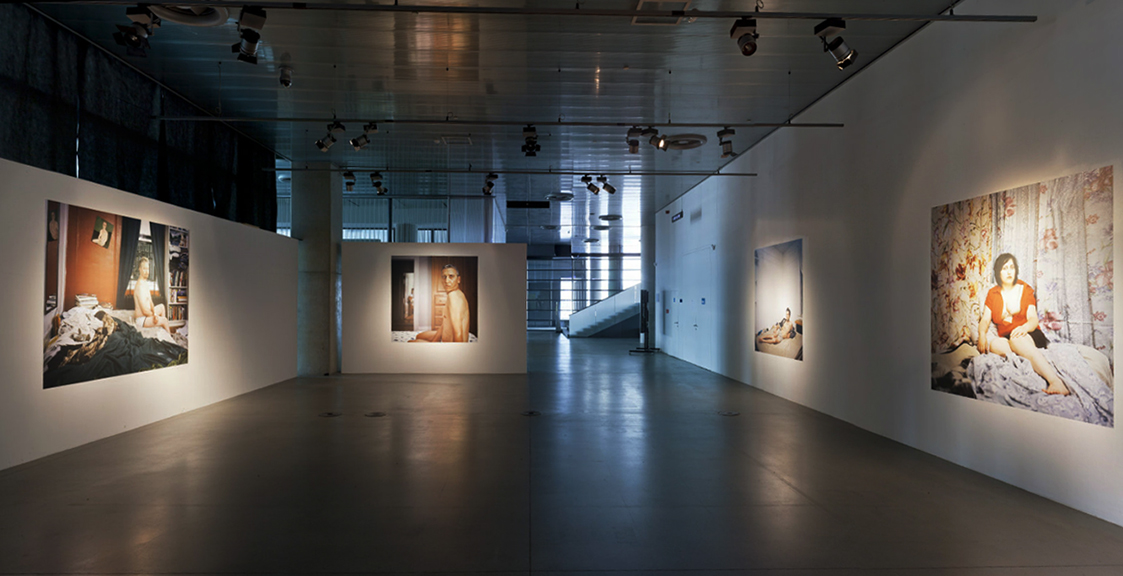

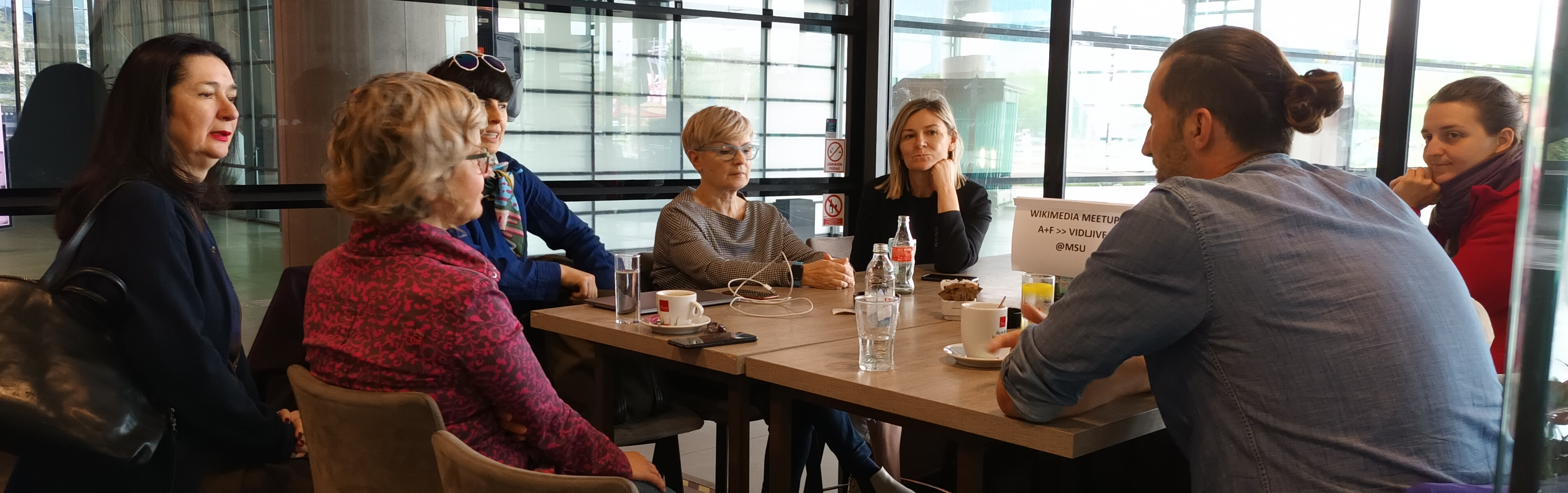
Wikimedia meetup Art+Feminism exhibition VIDLJIVE

== See also ==
- Croatian Museum of Naïve Art
- Institute for Contemporary Art, Zagreb
- Modern Gallery, Zagreb
- The Strossmayer Gallery of Old Masters
- List of museums in Croatia
