= The Visible Ones (exhibition) =

Project and exhibition of the Museum of Contemporary Art in Zagreb, Croatia

The Visible Ones (Croatian title: VIDLJIVE) is a multi–institutional project and exhibition of the Museum of Contemporary Art (MSU) in Zagreb, with the Museum of Modern Art in Dubrovnik, Museum of Fine Arts (MLU) in Osijek, Gallery of Fine Arts in Split, and Museum of Modern and Contemporary Art (MMSU) in Rijeka. Work of over 100 female artists from the collections of these institutions and their programs is presented in this exhibition.

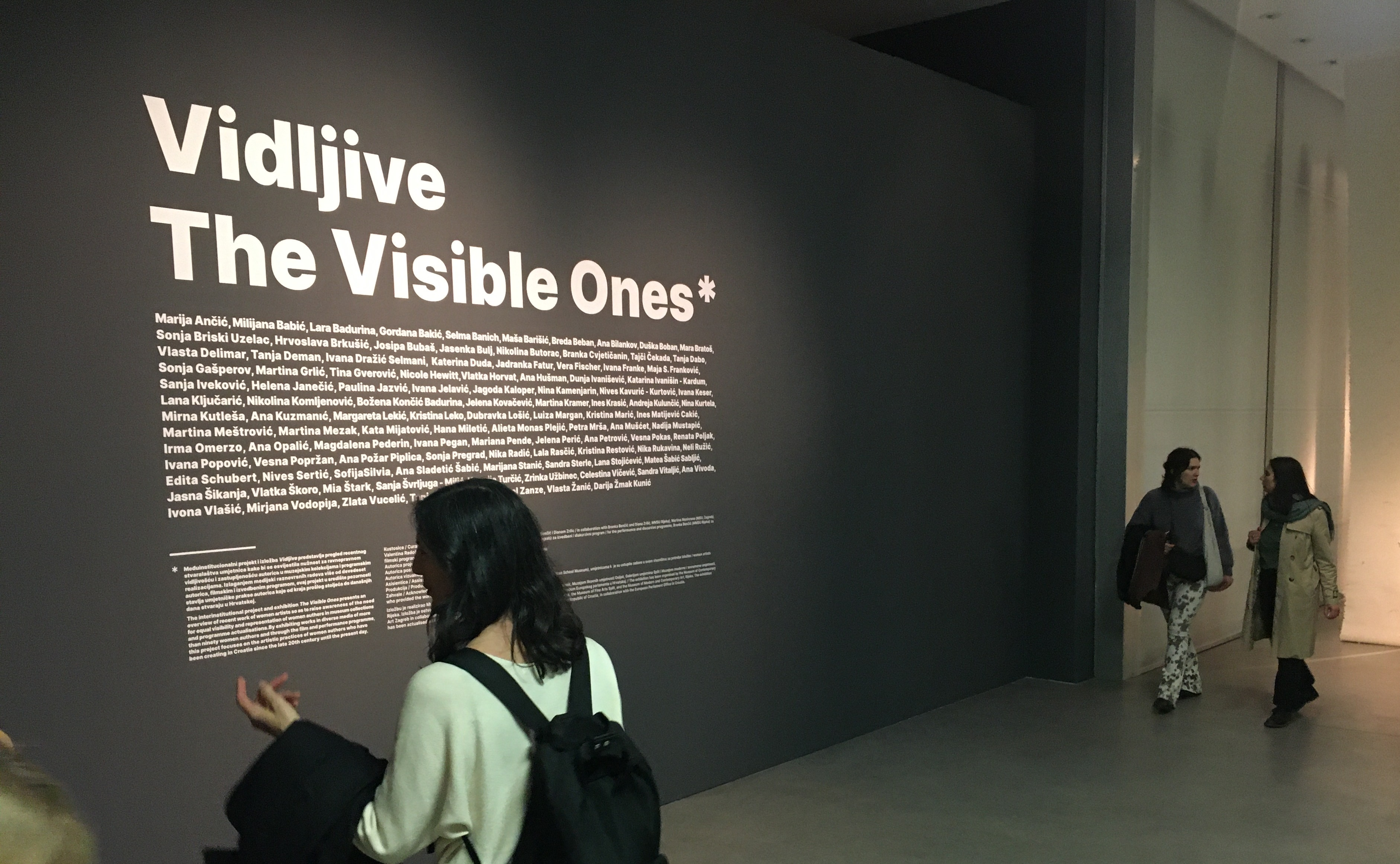
Exhibition entrance in Zagreb, 2023

The central exhibition at MSU was held in Zagreb in 2023. Nearing the end of 2023 and during 2024 partner institutions in Rijeka, Split, Dubrovnik and Osijek take turns hosting a less extensive form of this exhibition. The Visible Ones exhibition brings together the largest number of female authors and their works so far, offering a broad selection of female creativity over the past three decades. The project is supported by the city of Zagreb, The Ministry of Culture and Media and with the cooperation of the European Parliament's Office in Croatia.

== Theme ==
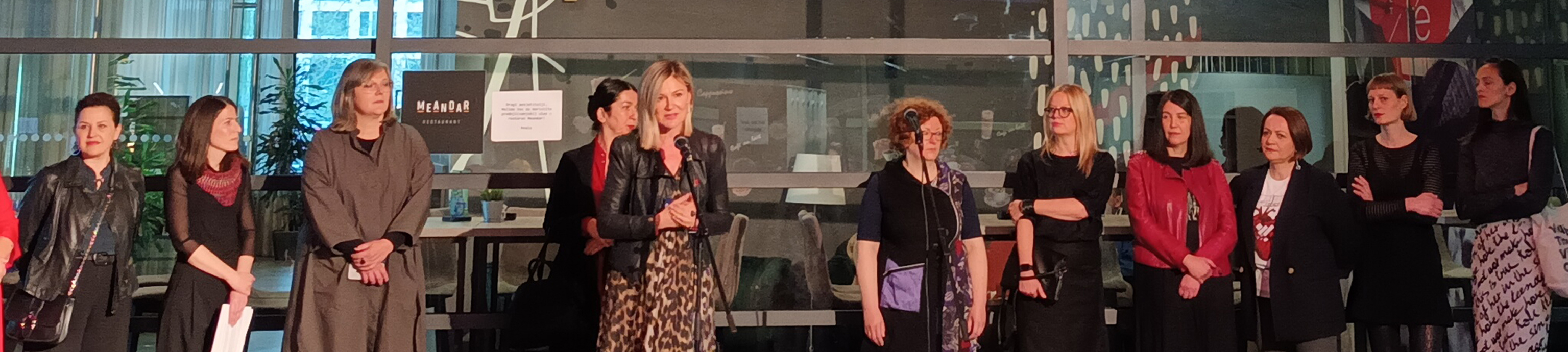
Curators at the opening in Zagreb, 2023

The project focuses on the low representation of female artists in art collections of museum institutions, and some aspects of the contemporary artistic practice of female artists in Croatia. Author of the concept and project lead is Martina Munivrana (MSU), with associates: Jasminka Babić (GU Split), Vilma Bartolić (MMSU Rijeka), Branka Benčić (MMSU Rijeka), Valentina Radoš (MLU Osijek), Rozana Vojvoda (GU Dubrovnik) and Ana Škegro (MSU Zagreb).

The research on female representation in art collections, public spaces and galleries, as well as on the art market, showed that female artists are only represented in around ten percent of works. This initiative seeks to resolve this by increasing female visibility and representation in the field of visual arts. The research was focused on the art created after the nineties of the so-called transition years. Social changes which started during the 1990s and are still happening have marginalized many female artists. This indirectly affected museum acquisitions and exhibition, as well as public visibility.

== Artists ==
Artists in exhibition and program:

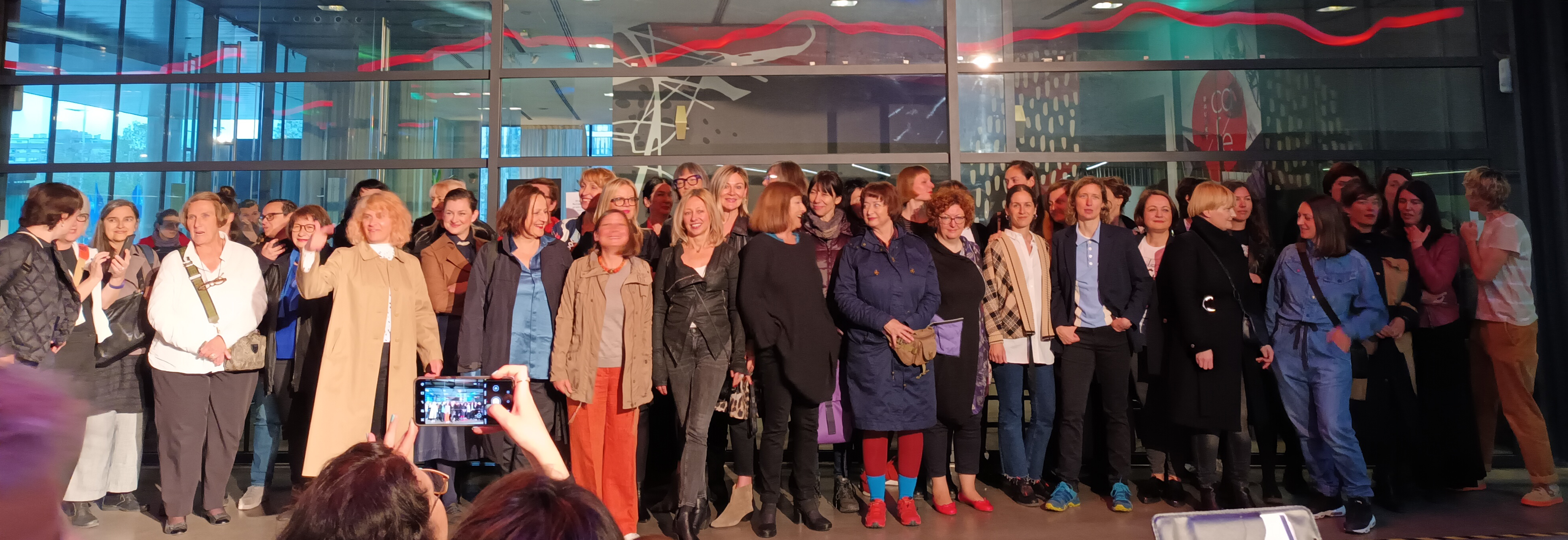
Artists at the opening in Zagreb, 2023

Marija Ančić, Milijana Babić, Lara Badurina, Gordana Bakić, selma banich, Maša Barišić, Breda Beban, Ana Bilankov, Duška Boban, Mara Bratoš, Sonja Briski Uzelac, Hrvoslava Brkušić, Josipa Bubaš, Jasenka Bulj, Nikolina Butorac, Branka Cvjetičanin, Tajči Čekada, Tanja Dabo, Vlasta Delimar, Tanja Deman, Ivana Dražić Selmani, Katerina Duda, Jadranka Fatur, Vera Fischer, Ivana Franke, Maja S. Franković, Sonja Gašperov, Martina Grlić, Tina Gverović, Nicole Hewitt, Vlatka Horvat, Ana Hušman, Dunja Ivanišević, Katarina Ivanišin - Kardum, Sanja Iveković, Helena Janečić, Paulina Jazvić, Ivana Jelavić, Jagoda Kaloper, Nina Kamenjarin, Nives Kavurić-Kurtović, Ivana Keser, Lana Ključarić, Nikolina Komljenović, Božena Končić Badurina, Jelena Kovačević, Martina Kramer, Ines Krasić, Andreja Kulunčić, Nina Kurtela, Mirna Kutleša, Ana Kuzmanić, Margareta Lekić, Kristina Leko, Dubravka Lošić, Luiza Margan, Kristina Marić, Ines Matijević Cakić, Martina Meštrović, Martina Mezak, Kata Mijatović, Hana Miletić, Alieta Monas Plejić, Petra Mrša, Ana Mušćet, Nadija Mustapić, Irma Omerzo, Ana Opalić, Nada Orel, Magdalena Pederin, Ivana Pegan, Mariana Pende, Jelena Perić, Ana Petrović, Vesna Pokas, Renata Poljak, Ivana Popović, Vesna Popržan, Ana Požar Piplica, Sonja Pregrad, Nika Radić, Lala Raščić, Kristina Restović, Nika Rukavina, Neli Ružić, Edita Schubert, Nives Sertić, SofijaSilvia, Ana Sladetić Šabić, Marijana Stanić, Sandra Sterle, Lana Stojićević, Matea Šabić Sabljić, Jasna Šikanja, Vlatka Škoro, Mia Štark, Sanja Švrljuga - Milić, Ksenija Turčić, Zrinka Užbinec, Celestina Vičević, Sandra Vitaljić, Ana Vivoda, Ivona Vlašić, Mirjana Vodopija, Zlata Vucelić, Tanja Vujasinović, Anabel Zanze, Vlasta Žanić, Darija Žmak Kunić.
