= Breda Beban =

Yugoslavian filmmaker and artist

Breda Beban (1952–2012) was a Yugoslavian film and video artist. Beban was born in Novi Sad and studied art in Zagreb. She moved to Britain in 1991.

== Career ==
Between 1986 and 1994 she made films and video works collaboratively with Hrvoje Horvatic. In 1992 she was part of the exhibition Committed Visions at the Museum of Modern Art, New York. Beban's two-screen video installation titled The Most Beautiful Woman in Gucha was presented at the 2007 Venice Biennale, and later acquired for the Speed Art Museum permanent collection. In 2001, she was the recipient of a Paul Hamlyn Foundation award for visual artists. In 2010, her project the Endless School was presented at the Tatton Park Biennial. Her works were exhibited in the Museum of Contemporary Art in Zagreb in the exhibition The Visible Ones from June 15 till November 1.

== Videography ==
- All Our Secrets Are Contained In An Image, with Hrvoje Horvatic (1987)
- Taking On A Name, with Hrvoje Horvatic (1987)
- Geography, with Hrvoje Horvatic (1989)
- The Left Hand Should Know The Right Hand, with Hrvoje Horvatic (1993)
- Absence She Said, with Hrvoje Horvatic (1994)
- Walk of the Three Chairs (2003)
- The Most Beautiful Woman in Gucha (2007)

== Collections ==
Her work is included in the collections of the National Gallery of Canada, the ZKM, the Arts Council Collection, the Museum of Contemporary Art, Zagreb and the Tate Museum and the Neuer Berliner Kunstverein.
