= Andreja Kulunčić =

Croatian artist

Andreja Kulunčić (born 1968) is a contemporary Croatian artist, living and working in Zagreb, Croatia.

In her art practice she deals with current social issues by appropriating various conventional forms of communication, for example: radio shows, advertisements, newspaper articles, etc. Her art focuses on the communication of concepts and ideas on socially engaged themes, and is thus process orientated as opposed to object based. Since 2009, she has been working in the University of Zagreb Academy of Fine Arts in the New Media department.

She has participated in numerous exhibitions in Croatia and abroad, the most significant ones being: Documenta 11 (Kassel, Germany, 2002), Manifesta 4 (Frankfurt/Main, Germany, 2002), 8th International Istanbul Biennial (Turkey, 2003), The American Effect at Whitney Museum of American Art (New York, 2003), Liverpool Biennial (UK, 2004) and Day Labor at P.S.1 (New York, 2005). She has also taken part in several artist-in-residence programs including, the 10th Triennial in India (Jaipur, India, 2001), Artspace Sydney, (Australia, 2002), the Walker Art Center (Minneapolis, U.S., 2003), and Art in General (New York, U.S., 2005).

Her work is most recently featured in the overview exhibition of female artists from Croatian Museum collections 'The Visible Ones' in The Museum of Contemporary Art.
