= Igor Franić =

Croatian architect

- Born: 1963 (age 62–63); Zagreb, SR Croatia, SFR Yugoslavia
- Occupation: Architect
- Buildings: Museum of Contemporary Art, Zagreb

Igor Franić (born 1963) is a Croatian architect, best known for designing the Museum of Contemporary Art in Zagreb, the capital of Croatia.

Franić won a competition for the building's design, his design winning out of 85 entries submitted. The cornerstone for the new building was laid in November 2003, and the new museum finally opened on 11 December 2009, after six years of construction which was beset with several delays. Originally planned to cost around 200 million HRK, the cost eventually amounted to 450 million HRK (around 84 million US$), invested in equal parts by the Ministry of Culture and the City of Zagreb.

Franić is also the author of Dubrovnik's monument of Kocka mora. Erected in 2007, the monument was removed in April 2020.

Franić is an assistant professor at the Faculty of Architecture.
