= Eyes of Purification =

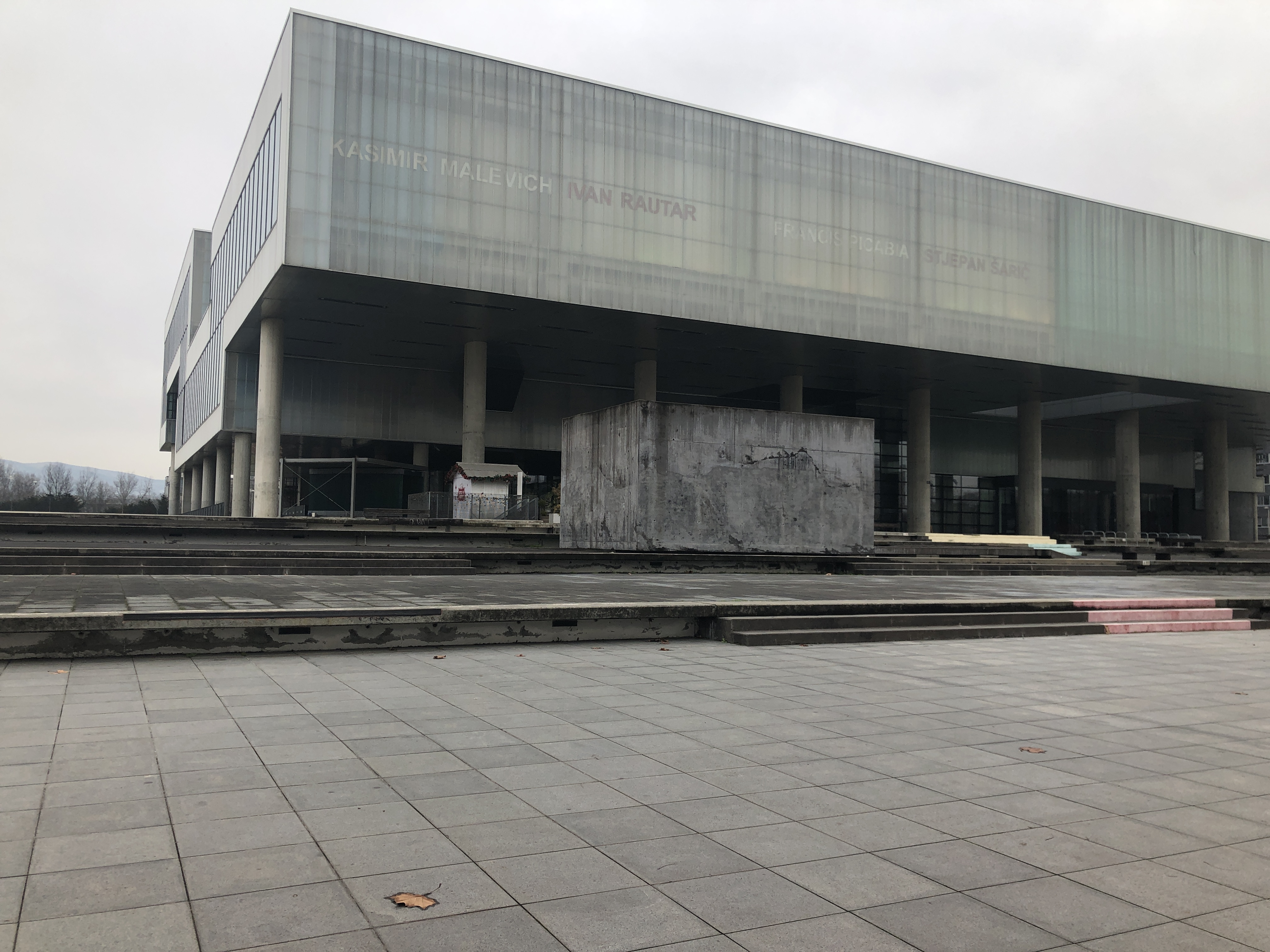
Eyes of purification art installation in front of the MSU

Eyes of Purification is an outdoor art installation designed by the Polish artist Mirosław Bałka in 2009 and displayed in front of the Museum of Contemporary Art of Zagreb at the south side entrance.

== Description ==
In this art installation, the artist thinks about the visitor of the museum burdened with the noise and nervousness outside roads and offers him a private meditation space where the visitor can enter it and turn it into a personal place for reflection and solitude. The roof has two openings eyes letting light and water into the dark and closed space. The uninterrupted circulation of water, the alternation of light and darkness, can be experienced as an ode to the cycle of life and death.
