= Vitra Slide Tower =

Observation tower in Weil am Rhein, Germany

Coordinates: 47°36′8″N 7°36′54″E

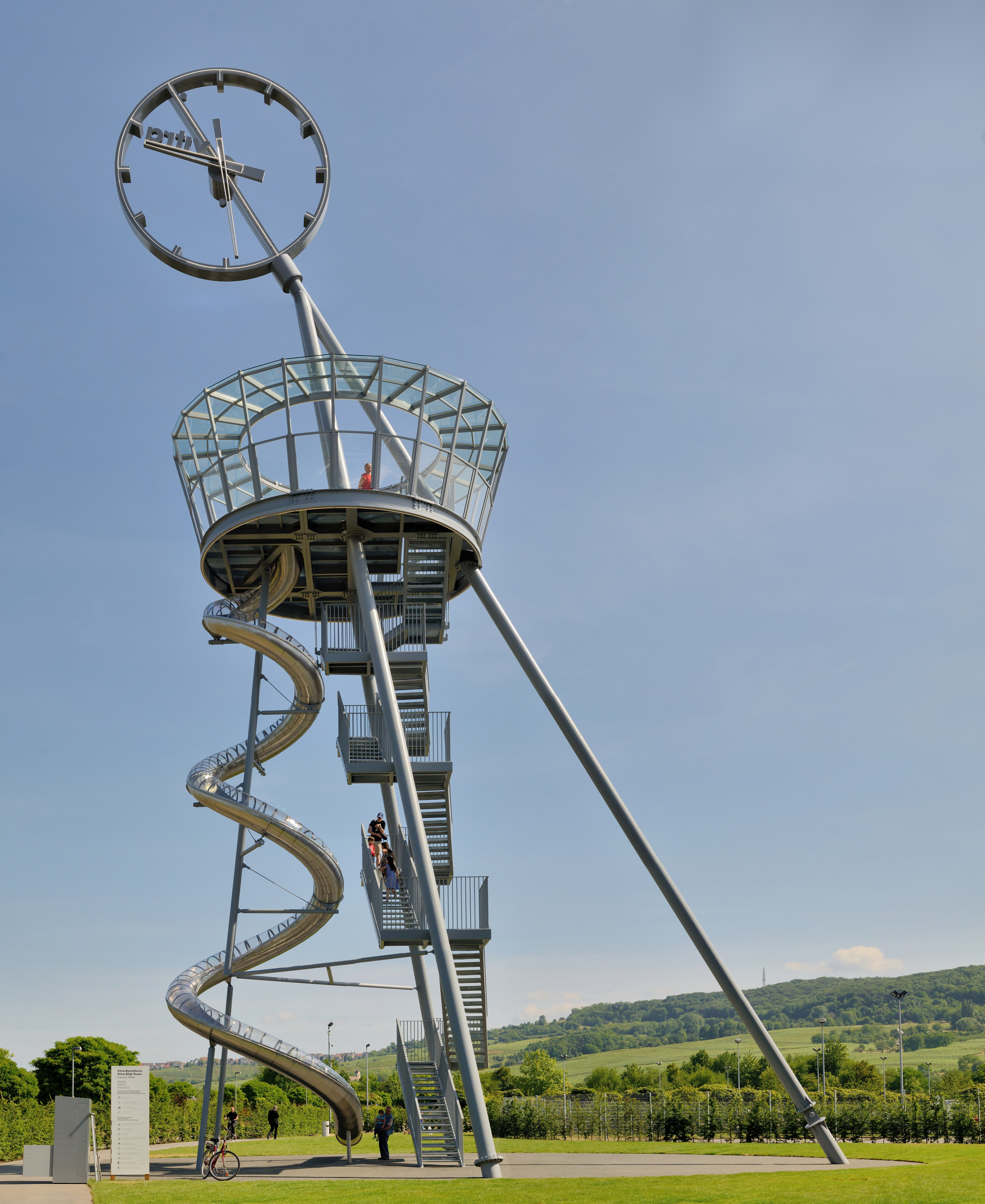
Vitra Slide Tower

The Vitra Slide Tower is a 30.74 meter high observation tower located in the Vitra Campus in Weil am Rhein, Germany. It was inaugurated on 18 June 2014 and was created by the German artist Carsten Höller. A viewing platform is situated at 17 metres of height. It serves also as the starting point for the 38-metre-long corkscrew tube slide. On top of the tower there is mounted a clock of a diameter of six metres.
