= Mirosław Bałka =

Polish sculptor

- Born: 16 December 1958 (age 67); Warsaw, Poland
- Education: Warsaw Academy of Fine Arts
- Known for: sculptor, video artist
- Awards: Order of Polonia Restituta (2014)

Miroslaw Balka (born 16 December 1958) is a Polish contemporary sculptor and video artist.

== Life and career ==
Miroslaw Balka is a sculptor also active in the field of experimental video and drawing, born in Warsaw, Poland.

In 1985 he graduated from the Warsaw Academy of Fine Arts, where since 2011 he has run the Studio of Spatial Activities in the Faculty of Media Art. Professor nominated by President of Poland in 2012. Between 1986 and 1989 together with Miroslaw Filonik and Marek Kijewski he established the artistic group Consciousness Neue Bieremiennost. He is a member of Akademie der Künste, Berlin.

He was the 1991 winner of the Mies van der Rohe Stipendium from the Kunstmuseum Krefeld. In 2009, Balka installed How It Is, the 10th Unilever Series commission for the Turbine Hall at Tate Modern, London, which opened on 13 October of that year.

He lives and works in Otwock, Poland, and Oliva, Spain.

== Work ==
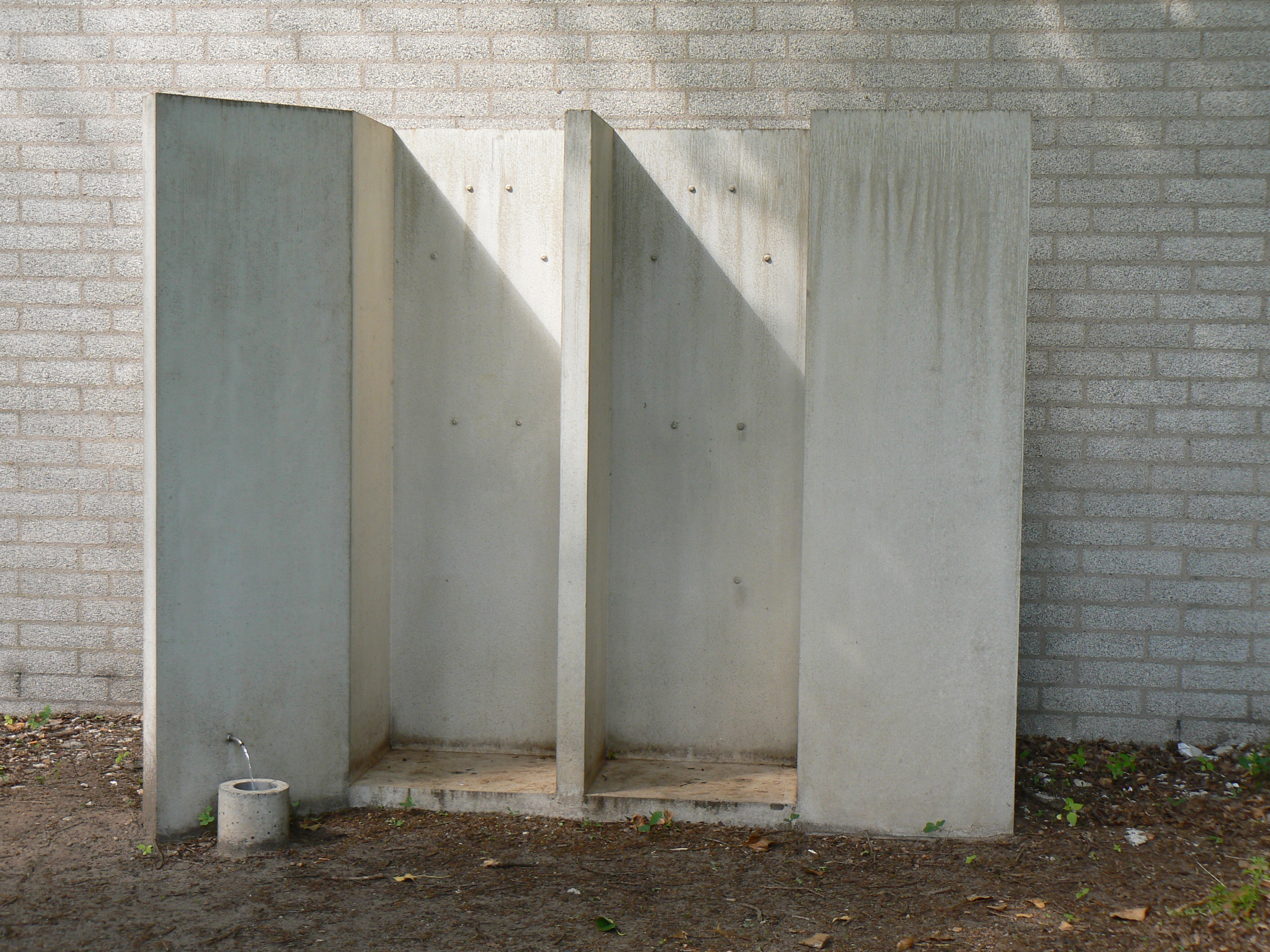
Fountain, 2008. Kröller-Müller Museum, Netherlands

The work of Mirosław Bałka is interdisciplinary but centres around sculpture and installation. The sculptor's work is influenced by family background: his grandfather was a gravestone cutter while his father engraved names on tombstones. The themes of many works revolve around historical traumatic events and memories, particularly the memory of World War II.

Initially Bałka created figurative works; later the artist shifted towards more abstract, monumental forms. These remained related to the subject of the human existence - the body in life, death and decay, personal and collective memory. The artist frequently uses steel, cement, salt, foam rubber and felt in his sculptures.

Miroslaw Balka has participated in major exhibitions worldwide including: Venice Biennale (1990, 2003, 2005, 2013; representing Poland in 1993), documenta IX, Kassel (1992), Sydney Biennale (1992, 2006), The Carnegie International, Pittsburgh (1995), Sao Paulo Biennale (1998), Liverpool Biennial (1999), Santa Fe Biennale (2006). In 2009 he presented the special project How It Is for the Unilever Series, Turbine Hall, Tate Modern, London. He is the author of the Memorial to the Victims of the Estonia Ferry Disaster in Stockholm (1997), and numerous spatial works including AUSCHWITZWIELICZKA, Cracow (2010), and HEAL, University of California, San Francisco (2009).

A series of conversations between Miroslaw Balka and professor Zygmunt Bauman were published in 2013.

He has participated in panel discussions with many distinguished speakers including Juan Vicente Aliaga, Julian Heynen, Anda Rottenberg, Kasia Redzisz, Anja Rubik, Joseph Rykwert and Vicente Todoli.

He designed the scenery for Paweł Mykietyn's composition: The Magic Mountain (opera, 2015) and Herr Thaddäus (2017).

== Collections ==
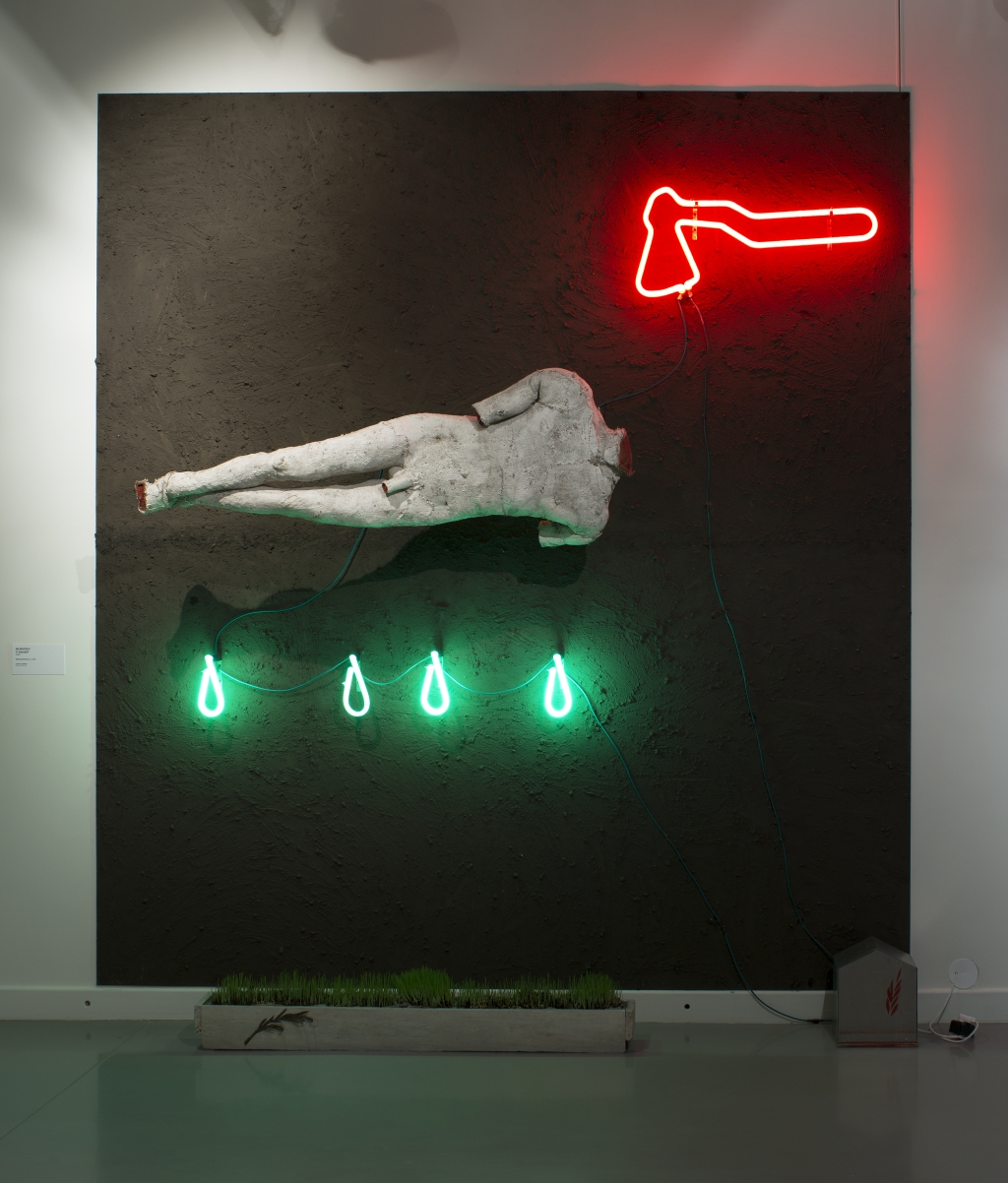
Mirosław Bałka; St. Wojciech, 1987, Museum of Art in Łódź

- Hirshhorn Museum, Washington DC
- Moderna Galerija, Ljubliana
- Museum of Contemporary Art, Los Angeles
- Museum of Modern Art, New York
- Museu Serralves, Porto
- Muzeum Sztuki, Łódź
- SFMOMA, San Francisco
- Tate Modern, London
- Art Institute of Chicago
- The Israel Museum, Jerusalem
- The National Museum of Art, Osaka
- Van Abbemuseum, Eindhoven
- Center of Contemporary Art, Warsaw
- Tel Aviv Museum of Art
- National Museum, Wrocław
- Eyes of Purification at the Museum of Contemporary Art, Zagreb

== Selected solo exhibitions ==
- 2019 – Random Access Memory, White Cube, London
- 2017 – DIE SPUREN, Museum Morsbroich, Leverkusen
- 2017 – CROSSOVER/S, Pirelli Hangar Bicocca, Milan
- 2015 – NERW. KONSTRUKCJA, Muzeum Sztuki MS1, Łódź
- 2014 – DIE TRAUMDEUTUNG 75,32m AMSL, Freud Museum, London
- 2014 – Fragment, Galeria Labirynt, Lublin
- 2013 – Fragment, Centre for Contemporary Art / Vinzavod, Moscow
- 2011 – Fragment, Akademie der Künste, Berlin and Centrum Sztuki Współczesnej, Warsaw
- 2010 – ctrl, Monasterio San Domingo de Silos / Museo Reina Sofia, Madrid
- 2010 – Wir Sehen Dich, Kunsthalle, Karlsruhe
- 2009 – Topography, Modern Art Oxford, Oxford
- 2009 – How It Is, Turbine Hall, Unilever Series, Tate Modern, London
- 2007 – Cruzamento, Museo de Arte Moderna, Rio de Janeiro
- 2006 – Lichtzwang, Kunstsammlung Nordrhein Westfalen K21, Düsseldorf
- 2004 – Bon voyage, Musée d’Art Moderne at Contemporain, Strasbourg
- 2001 – Around 21°15′00″E 52°06′17″N +GO-GO (1985–2001), SMAK, Gent[25] and Zachęta National Gallery of Art, Warsaw
- 2000 – Between meals, The National Museum of Art, Osaka
- 1997 – Selection, Museet for Samtidskunst, Oslo
- 1995 – Dawn, Tate Britain, London
- 1994 – 37.1, The Lannan Foundation, Los Angeles
- 1994 – Laadplatform + 7 werken (Die Rampe), Van Abbemuseum, Eindhoven
- 1994 – Rampa, Muzeum Sztuki, Łódź
- 1992 – 36,6, The Renaissance Society, Chicago
