= Zlatko Kopljar =

Zlatko Kopljar (born , 1962 in Zenica, Bosnia and Herzegovina) is a contemporary artist living and working in Zagreb, Croatia. He works in a variety of different media including photography, video and performance.

The artist always maintains a performative element, either in the production or presentation of the artwork. Since the 90s, Kopljar has called his works constructions which relates both to the constructive relationships within the work, and to the constructive space created in the relationships between the work and its viewers. The works are then titled in numerical order, K1, K2, etc. with 'K' standing for construction (konstrukcija).

He has had many group and solo exhibitions (since 1990) in Croatia and abroad. He has exhibited at the São Paulo Art Biennial (2005), the Museum of Modern and Contemporary Art (Rijeka, 2005), the Museum of Contemporary Art (Zagreb, 2005, 2010), The Kitchen (New York, 2003), Gallery Manes (Prague, 2002) and the exhibition From the K Series was held at the Museum of Contemporary Art (Novi Sad, 2010). His works are kept in the collections of the Museums of Contemporary Art in Zagreb and Rijeka, as well as in many private collections. He won the Franklin Furnace Grant for Performance in New York (2002).

== Published works on Zlatko Kopljar ==
- Šuvaković, Miško - Mapping the Body/With the Body, (Meandar, Zagreb, 2005).
- Rauchenberger, Johannes, Roban, Sandra Križić & Šuvaković, Miško – Zlatko Kopljar K12/ K13: Light Tower, (exh. cat, Museum of Contemporary Art, Zagreb, 2009).
