= Alieta Monas Plejić =

Croatian painter and art educator

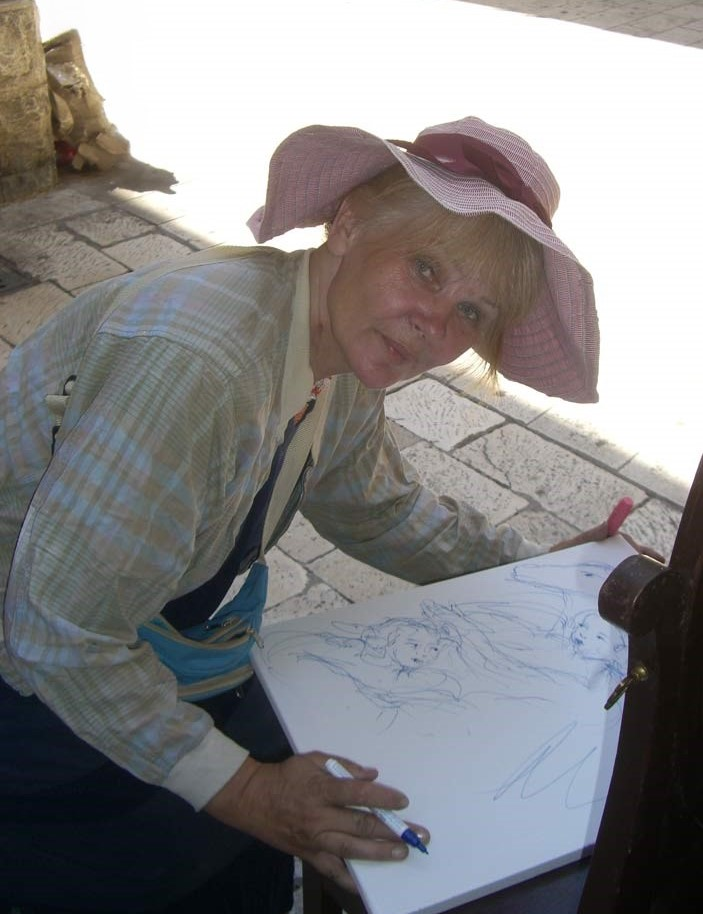
- Born: November 5, 1951; Pazin, SFR Yugoslavia
- Died: March 12, 2022 (aged 70); Rijeka, Croatia

Alieta Monas Plejić (November 5, 1951, Pazin – March 12, 2022, Rijeka) was a Croatian painter and art educator. In the early 1990s, she began a unique series of performances and light installations in public spaces in Split, initiating a distinct artistic exploration of the concept of light. Her work was recognized and awarded on multiple occasions.

== Biography ==
Alieta Monas Plejić was born in Pazin on November 5, 1951. She completed her primary education in Pazin and graduated from the Croatian Gymnasium in 1970. In 1972, she earned a degree in fine arts from the Pedagoška akademija, and in 1977, she completed her studies in painting at the Academy of Fine Arts in the class of Professor Nikola Reiser.

Dedicated to working with children, Monas Plejić founded the children's biennial United Bright World in the 1990s. In Split, she taught painting and drawing at the School of Fine Arts until her retirement in 2013. She was a member of the Croatian Artists' Association – Split.

== Painting ==
The main theme of Alieta Monas Plejić's painting was light. She began focusing on this motif during the early 1990s, at the onset of the war, initiating cycles dedicated to light, which were reflected in her exhibitions and ambient installations. Notable projects include Svjetlosni Peristil in Diocletian's Palace, presented on Christmas in 1991 and 1997, and Svjetlehem II in 2017, where she planned to illuminate parts of the Pazin Pit. Key cycles related to the theme of light are Zidovi svjetlosti (Walls of Light), Eppur e luce sopra d'ogni luce – Ipak je svjetlost (And Yet There Is Light Above All Light), and Eppur e luce sopra d'ogni luce – Ipak je svjetlost nad svjetlostima (And Yet There Is Light Above All Lights).

In addition to her focus on light, Monas Plejić's artwork prominently featured nudes and portraits. Her art was inspired by figures such as Einstein, Dante, and Dostoevsky, and she dedicated paintings to significant literary and artistic figures, including Tolstoy's Room, Tin's Room, and Vidović's Studio.

Some of her most notable works include Žena na propuhu (Woman in a Draft, 1981), Judita II (1984), Svijetli (The Bright Ones, 2010), and Sloboda vodi narod (Liberty Leading the People, 2017).

== Exhibitions ==
She participated in both group and solo exhibitions. Her first solo exhibition was held in Pazin in 1979. She later exhibited individually at Salon Galić in Split in 1982, and at Galerija Nova in Zagreb, where she showcased her work from the 1980s.

As part of the 41st Split Salon titled "Not Completely Lost to Each Other," her visual works were highlighted, promoting the complexities of feminist genealogies, productive dialogues, and the inclusion of environmental and local contexts. The exhibition took place across various locations in Split, including Salon Galić and the Multimedia Cultural Center Split. Monas Plejić's open display was positioned at the entrance of the Multimedia Cultural Center, where four of her paintings were exhibited, along with four empty framed spaces reserved for future additions to her artistic archive.

Her work was also featured in The Visible Ones exhibition in 2023 and 2024. This project aims to raise awareness about the need for gender equality and the representation of women in art. Among the displayed pieces were Judita II(1984) and Žena na propuhu (1981), both created using mixed techniques.

== Awards ==
The artist received several awards throughout her career. Her first award was the Ars Histriae VIII Charter, which she won in Rovinj in 1982, followed by the Split Salon Award the same year in Split. In 1984, she earned the Ars Histriae IX Diploma and the Grisia Award, both in Rovinj.
