= Edita Schubert =

Croatian artist (1947–2001)

Edita Schubert (17 May 1947 – 27 July 2001) was a Croatian artist whose work includes painting, collage and installations.

== Biography ==
Schubert was born in Virovitica, Yugoslavia, in 1947. In 1971, she graduated in painting from the Academy of Fine Arts, University of Zagreb. After graduation, she started working at the Anatomy Department of the University of Zagreb School of Medicine, drawing anatomy; she continued working there until her death. Her early works were entirely realistic, later transitioning into installations made of everyday materials combined with painted surfaces. In 1978 and in 1980, she received the Youth Salon Award. In the early 1980s, during the trend of the transavantgarde style, Schubert created a series of large-format works with an unusual painterly expression. In the mid-1980s, she shifted to a geometric phase. In these works, she used acrylic on paper with specific blue and red colors, along with black. She continued to create installations during the 1990s, and in 2001, exhibited web art. She received the Josip Račić Award in 2000. Schubert died in Samobor, Zagreb, in 2001.

=== Major Works ===
In 1991, Schubert created a series of collages, where over a canvas covered with newspaper, she placed black horizontal and vertical lines on pages displaying political commentary and photographs. For art historian Sandra Križić Roban, "The black striped elements in [Schubert's] work are not read as a negative opponent to the world in front of or behind. ... They are the remnants of a time of constructed feelings, apparent voids in which metaphysical fulfillment was felt. By giving them a more concrete form, Edita Schubert reveals this "void", deeply experienced." These works are part of the collection of the Museum of Contemporary Art, Zagreb. The artist critiques the influence of censorship through these works.

Her spatial installation called Ambience (1996) questions the position of humans in society. The work consists of six painted self-portraits mounted on photographic tripods.

== Exhibitions ==
- 1982 Yugoslav Pavilion, Venice Biennale
- 1985 Nina Ivančić and Edita Schubert, Museum of Contemporary Art, Belgrade
- 1991 Edita Schubert, Prošireni mediji (Expanded Media Gallery)
- 2013 Edita Schubert: Horizons, Museum of Fine Arts, Osijek
- 2015-2016 Retrospektiva, Klovićevi Dvori Gallery; Museum of Fine Arts, Osijek
- 2023 Edita Schubert. Self-Portrait Behind a Perforated Canvas, Galerie Molitor, Berlin

== Collections ==
- Museum of Contemporary Art, Zagreb
- Modern Gallery, Zagreb
- Gallery of Fine Arts, Split
- City Museum, Virovitica

== Legacy ==
In her hometown, Virovitica, there is a promenade named after Schubert. Her visual works inspired the decorations on the promenade.
