= Test Site =

2006–07 Tate Modern work by Carsten Höller

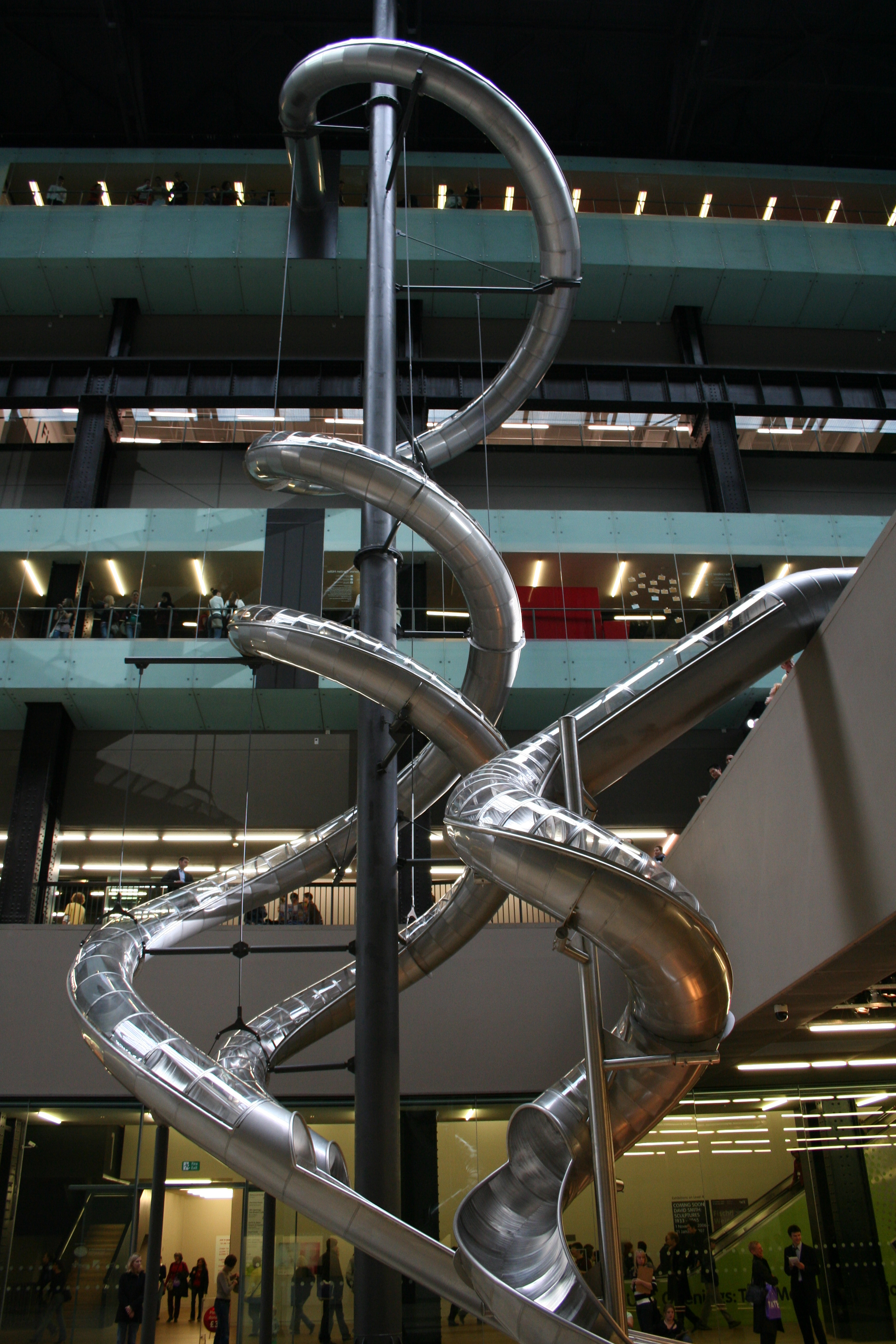
The 2nd, 3rd and 5th floor slides from the Test Site exhibit

Test Site is a relational art installation, that was displayed in the turbine hall of Tate Modern in London, UK, between October 2006 and 9 April 2007. Test Site was designed by Carsten Höller, and is the seventh commission of the series of works in the turbine hall sponsored by Unilever known as "The Unilever Series".

The exhibit consisted of a series of metal slides. There is a total of five slides, two starting on the second floor, and one on each floor after that up to the 5th floor. The slides were composed of metal and fibreglass, and covered all the way around.

Visitors could slide down the slides of the installation free, but timed entry tickets were required for all but the second floor slides.
